= Ford Expedition =

Series of full-size SUVs produced by Ford

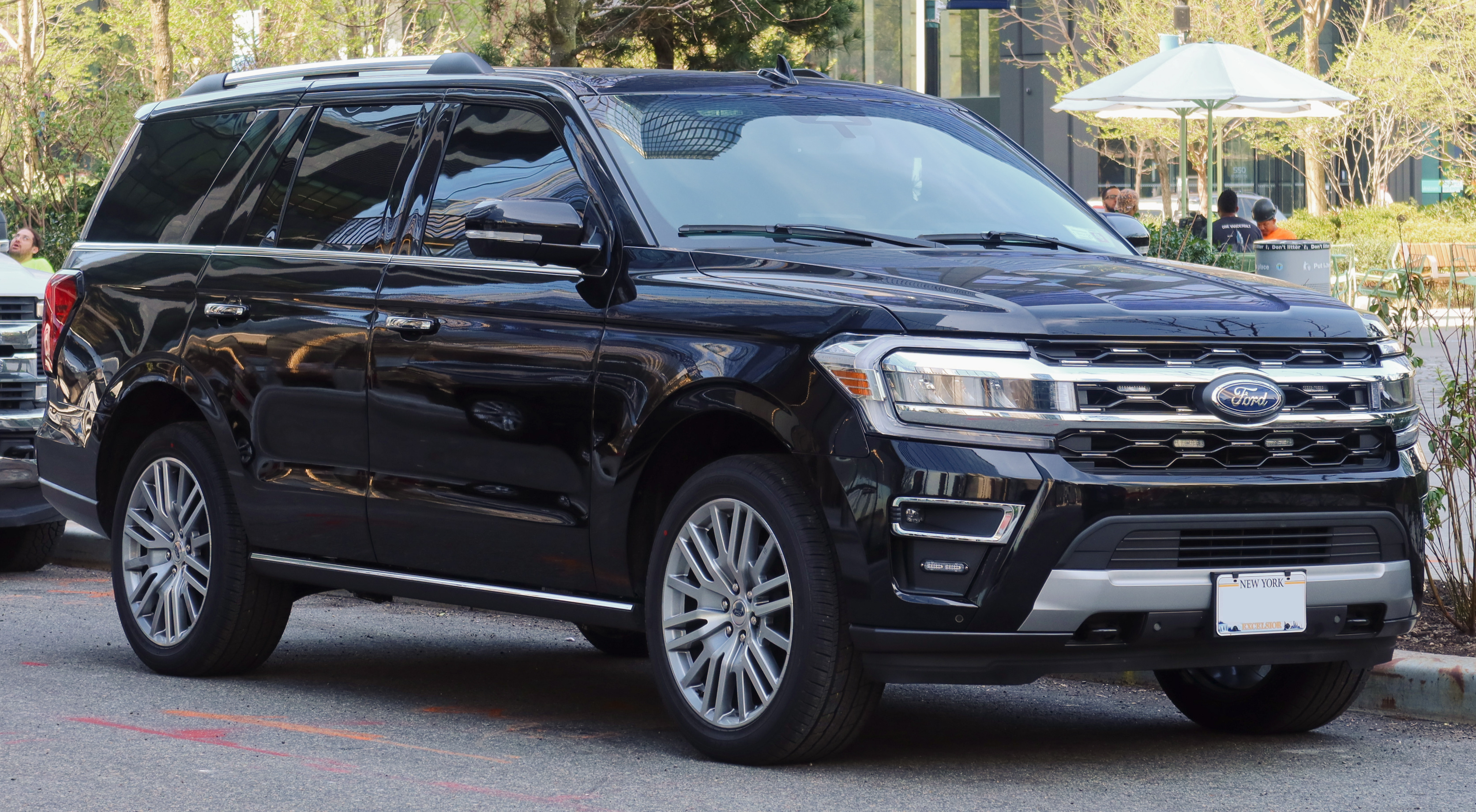

Overview
- Manufacturer: Ford Motor Company
- Production: 1996–present
- Model years: 1997–present

Body and chassis
- Class: Full-size SUV
- Body style: 5-door SUV
- Layout: Front-engine, rear-wheel-drive; Front-engine, four-wheel-drive
- Chassis: Body-on-frame
- Related: Lincoln Navigator

Chronology
- Predecessor: Ford Bronco; Ford Excursion (Expedition EL/Max)

The Ford Expedition is a full-size SUV produced by Ford Motor Company since the 1997 model year. Introduced as the replacement for the 1978–1996 Ford Bronco, the Expedition again maintained commonality with the F-150, shifting its form factor to a truck-based five-door station wagon. Initially competing between the Chevrolet Tahoe and Chevrolet Suburban (and their GMC Yukon counterparts), the Expedition also serves a competitor against the Toyota Sequoia, Nissan Armada, and the Jeep (Grand) Wagoneer. From 2000 to 2006, the Expedition was slotted below the Ford Excursion in size (based on the Ford F-250 Super Duty). Currently in its fifth generation (introduced for 2025), the Expedition is produced in two wheelbases, with both versions offering seating for up to eight passengers.

For its first two generations, the Ford Expedition shared the Ford P platform with the Ford F-150, shifting to the Ford T platform, which it uses today. Since its second generation (introduced for 2003), the Expedition has differed from the F-150 in its use of independent suspension for all four wheels, becoming the first full-size SUV to do so. Since 1998, the Expedition has shared its platform with the Lincoln Navigator, the first full-size luxury SUV.

Ford currently assembles the Expedition at its Kentucky Truck Assembly facility (Louisville, Kentucky) alongside the Lincoln Navigator and Super Duty trucks (F-250 to F-600). Prior to 2009, the model line was assembled by the Michigan Assembly Plant (Wayne, Michigan).

== Background ==
The Expedition nameplate first made its debut in 1992 on a Ford F-150 concept vehicle; in 1995, the nameplate returned as a trim level package for the three-door Ford Explorer Sport (replacing the Eddie Bauer option package). The option was offered solely for 1995 and dropped in anticipation of the full-size SUV line.

The Expedition offered up to nine-passenger seating prior to 2007 (with a front bench seat option in the first row); 2007–present model year Expeditions have bucket seats in the first row and seats eight passengers. From its introduction in 1996 to 2014, it was powered by a standard Triton V8 engine when, for the 2015 model year, it was replaced with a more compact, yet more efficient and powerful 3.5L EcoBoost V6 engine. It is similar to the Lincoln Navigator, especially in Limited (2005–2024) or King Ranch (2005–2017; 2020–present) high-end trims; both of which were introduced in 2004 for the 2005 model year. With the 2011 model year, the base model was designated XL, an upgraded XLT, and a new XLT Premium that replaced the Eddie Bauer trim (1997–2010) which was phased out from the entire Ford vehicle lineup. As of 2010, over 1,545,241 Expeditions (both standard and EL/Max) had been sold. A modified Special Service Vehicle version is available for law enforcement agencies, fire departments, and emergency medical services.

The Expedition is also known for being one of the longest-lasting vehicles on the road. With 5% of vehicles over 200,000 miles, it landed the #4 spot in a 2016 study by iSeeCars.com listing the top 10 longest-lasting vehicles. The Expedition was also the last Ford vehicle to retain its older design found in the early to mid 2000's, meaning, all the way up to 2017, it kept its triangular-styled tail-lamps and rounded-rectangular shaped headlamps along with the overall boxy shape of the body.

== First generation (1997) ==
First generation
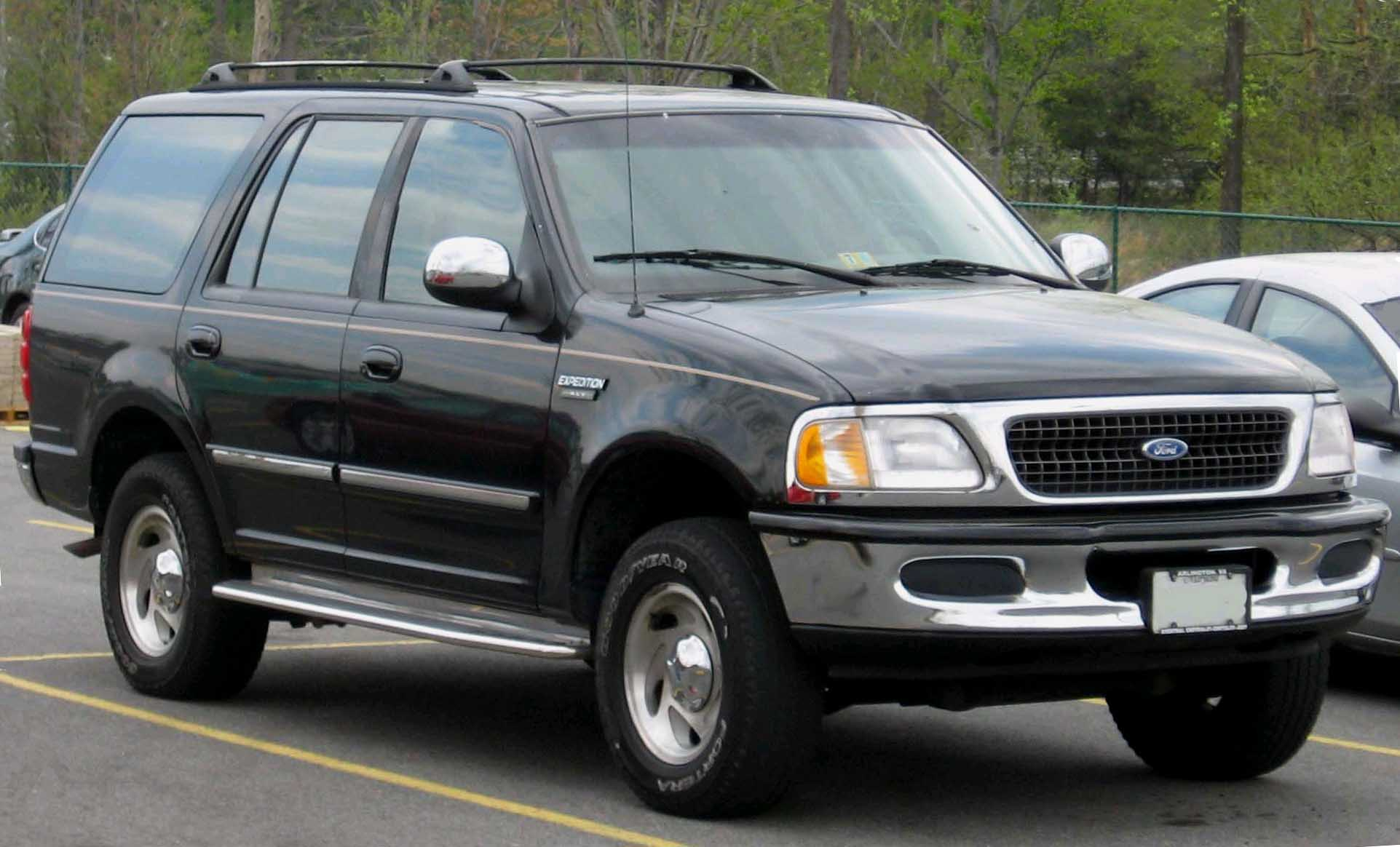

Overview
- Model code: UN93
- Production: July 22, 1996 – March 2002
- Model years: 1997–2002
- Assembly: Wayne, Michigan, United States
- Designer: Bob Aikins (1993)

Body and chassis
- Related: Ford F-150; Lincoln Blackwood; Lincoln Navigator

Powertrain
- Engine: 4.6 L Triton V8; 5.4 L Triton V8
- Transmission: 4-speed E4OD automatic 4-speed 4R100 automatic (1999–2002); 4-speed 4R70W automatic (4.6L only); Transfer case (4×4 models); 2-Speed BorgWarner 4406; High range ratio: 1.00:1; Low range ratio: 2.64:1

Dimensions
- Wheelbase: 1996–1998: 119.0 in (3,023 mm); 1998–2002: 119.1 in (3,025 mm)
- Length: 204.6 in (5,197 mm)
- Width: 78.6 in (1,996 mm)
- Height: 1996–98 4WD: 76.4 in (1,941 mm); 1996–98 2WD: 74.9 in (1,902 mm); 1998–2000 4WD: 78.4 in (1,991 mm); 1998–2000 2WD: 76.5 in (1,943 mm); 2000–02 4WD: 76.6 in (1,946 mm); 2000–02 2WD: 74.3 in (1,887 mm)

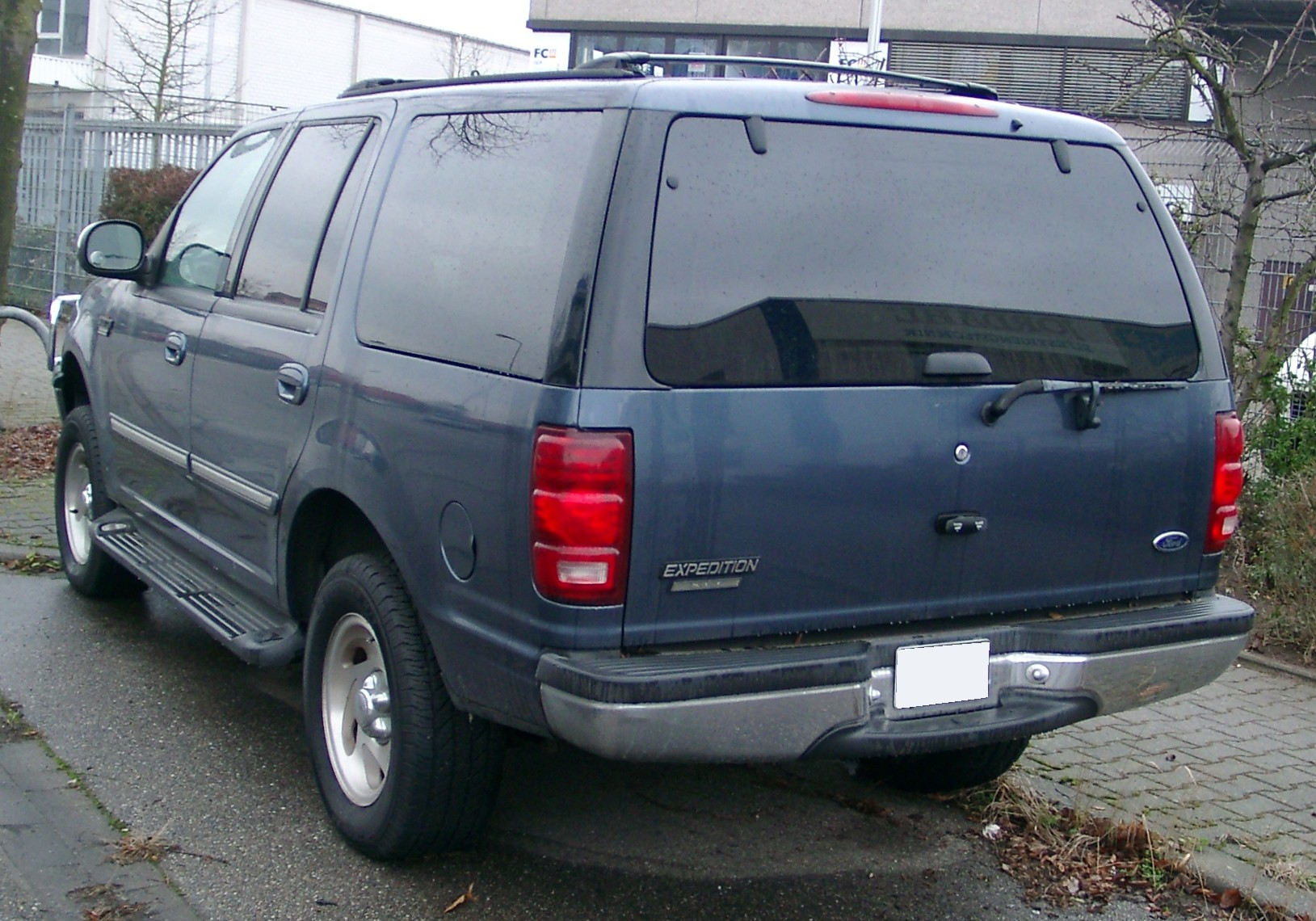
Ford Expedition XLT

Known internally at Ford as the UN93, the first generation Expedition was developed under the UN93 program from 1993 to 1996, headed by chief engineer Dale Claudepierre at a cost of US$1.3 billion. Initial planning began in 1991 parallel to PN96 F-Series development, prior to the UN93 program fully being approved in 1993. Styling approval was completed in early 1993 (3 1/2 years ahead of 1996 production) under design chief Bob Aikins, with the UN93 design being frozen by September 1993, at 34 months prior to the start of production in July 1996.

The all-new full-size SUV was unveiled on May 9, 1996, and launched on October 2, 1996, as a 1997 model. It replaced the aging two-door Ford Bronco. The XLT was the base model. The Expedition featured optional three row seating, first-row captain's chair seating, available second row captains chair seating, leather seating surfaces, illuminated running boards, heated side view mirrors, power moon roof, dual zone climate control and Ford's Mach audio sound system with rear subwoofer. Many of these features were standard on the Eddie Bauer version.

Expedition was available with automatic full-time ControlTrac four-wheel drive with two-speed dual range BorgWarner 4406 transfer case and a center multi-disc differential. ControlTrac was introduced in 1995 and included four selectable modes: Two High, Auto, Four High (lock) and Four Low (lock). Two High mode and Auto mode with auto-lock was not available.

A short- and long-arm (SLA) independent front suspension with speed-sensitive power-assisted steering was combined with a multi-link rear live axle. Optional equipment included off-road under-body skid-plate protection, Traction-Lok rear limited-slip differential, and a heavy-duty trailer towing package.

Optional was an electronically controlled pneumatic air suspension system that would raise and lower the vehicle depending on road and load conditions. The system also included a kneel-down mode for easier ingress and egress, as well as loading cargo,

Standard was the 4.6L Triton V8 with the 5.4L version optional. The first-generation Expedition was rated as a Low Emission Vehicle (LEV). The latter engine combined with the heavy-duty trailer towing package and appropriate axle ratio can achieve a towing capacity of 8,100 pounds (3,700 kg).

=== Powertrain ===
Engine name	Configuration	Model Year	Output		Transmission
Engine name	Configuration	Model Year	Power	Torque	Transmission
Ford Triton 2-valve V8	4.6 L (281 cu in) SOHC 16V V8	1997–1998	215 hp (160 kW; 218 PS)	290 lb⋅ft (393 N⋅m)	4-speed 4R70W automatic (1997–2002); 4-speed E4OD automatic (1997–1998); 4-speed 4R100 automatic (1998–2002) Transfer case (4×4): 2-speed BorgWarner 4406; High range 1:1, low range: 2.64:1
Ford Triton 2-valve V8	5.4 L (330 cu in) SOHC 16V V8	1997–1998	230 hp (172 kW; 233 PS)	325 lb⋅ft (441 N⋅m)	4-speed 4R70W automatic (1997–2002); 4-speed E4OD automatic (1997–1998); 4-speed 4R100 automatic (1998–2002) Transfer case (4×4): 2-speed BorgWarner 4406; High range 1:1, low range: 2.64:1
Ford Triton 2-valve V8	4.6 L (281 cu in) SOHC 16V V8	2001–2002	240 hp (179 kW; 243 PS)	291 lb⋅ft (395 N⋅m)	4-speed 4R70W automatic (1997–2002); 4-speed E4OD automatic (1997–1998); 4-speed 4R100 automatic (1998–2002) Transfer case (4×4): 2-speed BorgWarner 4406; High range 1:1, low range: 2.64:1
Ford Triton 2-valve V8	5.4 L (330 cu in) SOHC 16V V8	1999–2002	260 hp (194 kW; 264 PS)	350 lb⋅ft (475 N⋅m)	4-speed 4R70W automatic (1997–2002); 4-speed E4OD automatic (1997–1998); 4-speed 4R100 automatic (1998–2002) Transfer case (4×4): 2-speed BorgWarner 4406; High range 1:1, low range: 2.64:1

=== Safety and security ===
A two air bag supplementary restraint system (SRS) with 2-way occupant protection was standard. The air bags would adjust deployment force depending on crash severity. Features included SecuriLock with smart key and engine immobilizer, security approach lamps, four-wheel anti-lock braking system (ABS), side-intrusion door beams, post-crash fuel pump shut-off, and three-point safety belts for all rows of seating with tension and locking retractors.

An optional four air bag SRS with 4-way occupant protection was available for the 2000–2002 model years. This included seat-mounted side torso side air bags.

The 2001 model introduced a BeltMinder system to detect when the driver did not have their safety belt secured.

NHTSA NCAP crash scores:
1997–2000		2001–2002	
Frontal Driver:	4/5 stars	Frontal Driver:	5/5 stars
Frontal Passenger:	4/5 stars	Frontal Passenger:	5/5 stars
Side Driver:	Not tested	Side Driver:	Not tested
Side Rear Passenger:	Not tested	Side Rear Passenger:	Not tested
Rollover Resistance (RWD):	Not tested	Rollover Resistance (RWD):	2/5 stars
Rollover Resistance (4WD):	Not tested	Rollover Resistance (4WD):	2/5 stars

=== Model year changes ===
==== 1998 ====
No major cosmetic or mechanical changes. A new exterior color was added: Wedgewood Blue. Limited availability for 4.6L Windsor versus Romeo engine. This limited run was available only for Expeditions equipped with the Ultimate Tow Package.

==== 1999 ====
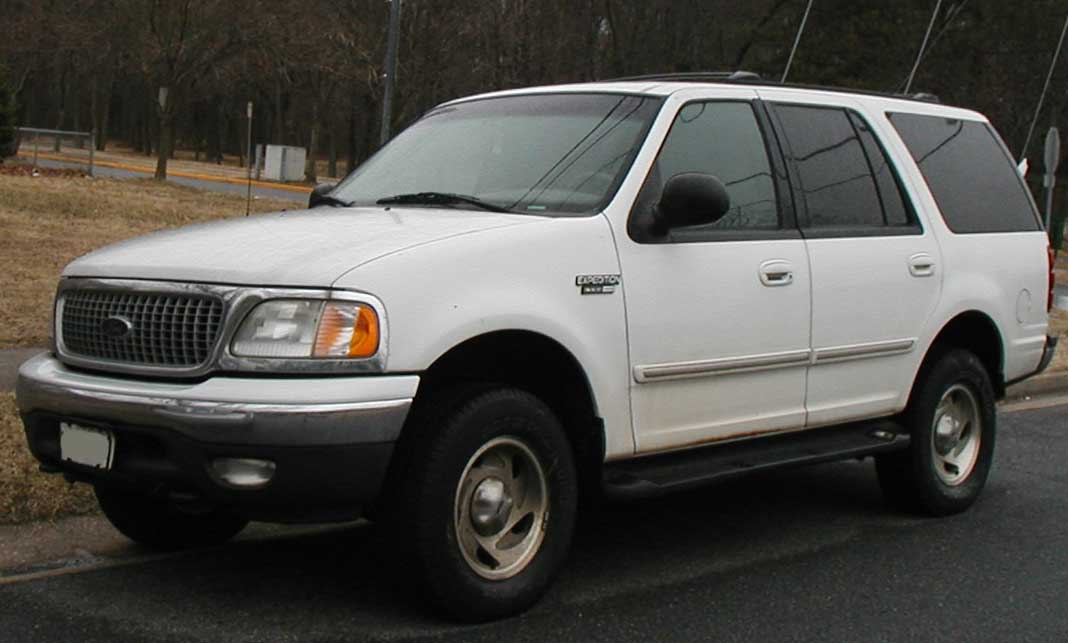
1999–2002 facelift

The 1999 model year received a facelift similar to that of the contemporary Ford F-150. Included in the update was a new front grille which now dropped lower in the center, as well as a new front bumper that incorporated the fog lamps into the lower valance and larger center air intake. Both the 4.6L and 5.4L V8 engines received updates including increased power and torque. The Two-High mode for automatic full-time ControlTrac four-wheel-drive equipped models was dropped, leaving only Auto, Four High (lock), and Four Low (lock) modes. The dashboard also received an updated radio and air conditioning controls and revised gauge cluster and a digital odometer for the first time.

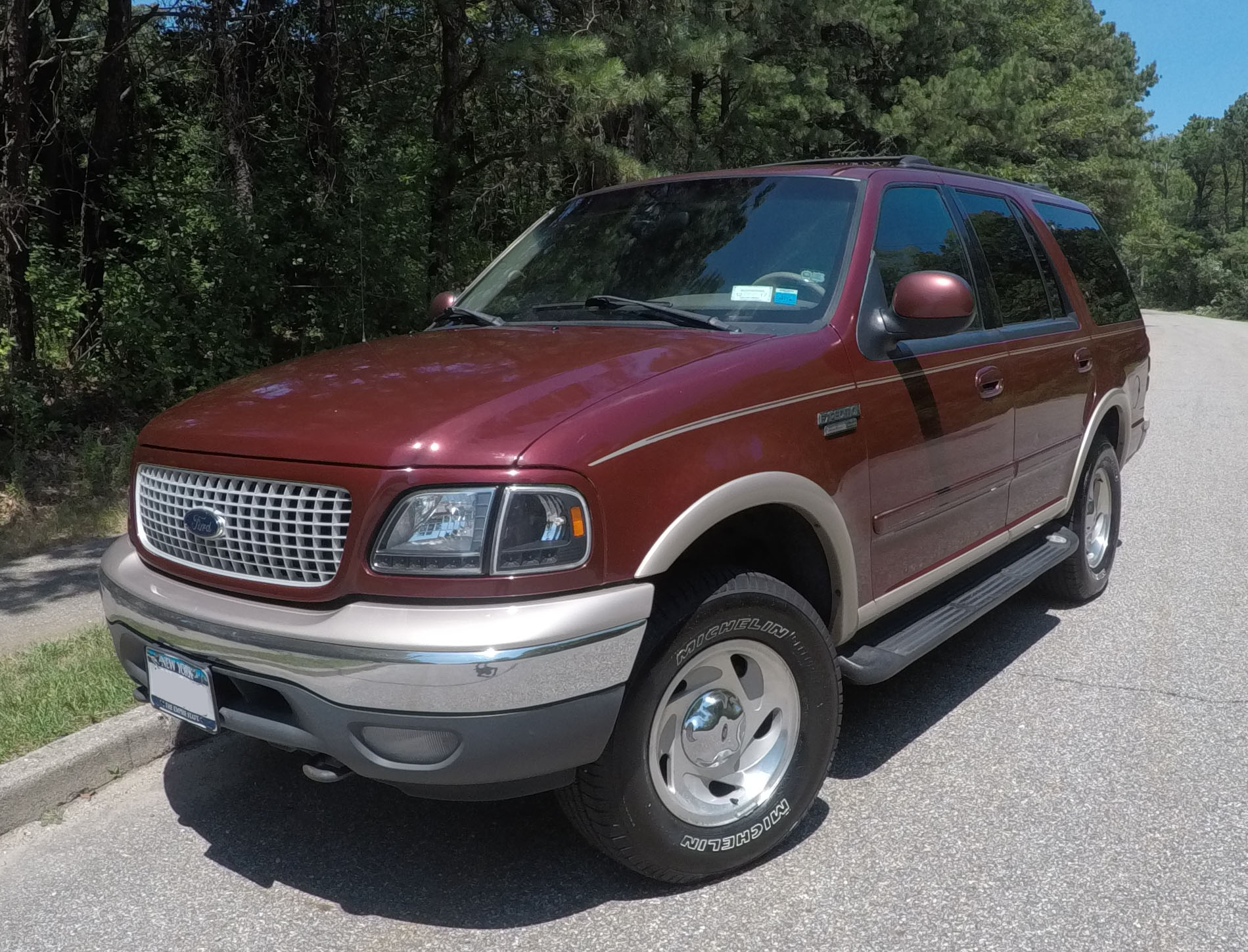
1999 Eddie Bauer Expedition

==== 2000 ====
Available features on 2000 models included a hidden radio antenna (integrated into the rear quarter panel window glass), Gentex auto dimming electrochromatic rearview mirrors, lane departure indicators on side view mirrors (before on the glass portion of the mirror). The lower front bumper valance and illuminated running boards were changed over to Arizona beige to complement the standard Arizona beige exterior body trim on Eddie Bauer models. Estate Green Clearcoat Metallic replaces Spruce Green Clearcoat Metallic, and Arizona Beige Metallic replaces Harvest Gold Clearcoat Metallic in the color palette.

==== 2001 ====
New trim packages included the XLT model. XLT versions could be optioned with the XLT No Boundaries package that included monochromatic black paintwork with chrome grille and special alloy wheels. Eddie Bauer versions could be optioned with the Eddie Bauer Premier package that included either monochromatic Arizona beige or solid black paintwork with painted alloy wheels and upgraded leather seating. A reverse sensing system was made optional.

==== 2002 ====
No major cosmetic or mechanical changes. Last year model for the UN93. This was also the last model year for XLT No Boundaries and Eddie Bauer Premier trims.

=== Ford SVT Thunder ===
Ford's Special Vehicle Team proposed a high-performance variant called Thunder for the 2000 model year. It was equipped with the 360 hp (268 kW) 5.4 L V8 from the SVT Lightning pickup and had a top speed of 140 mph (230 km/h). However, since this generation of the Expedition had only two model years left, it was never put into production.

== Second generation (2003) ==
Second generation
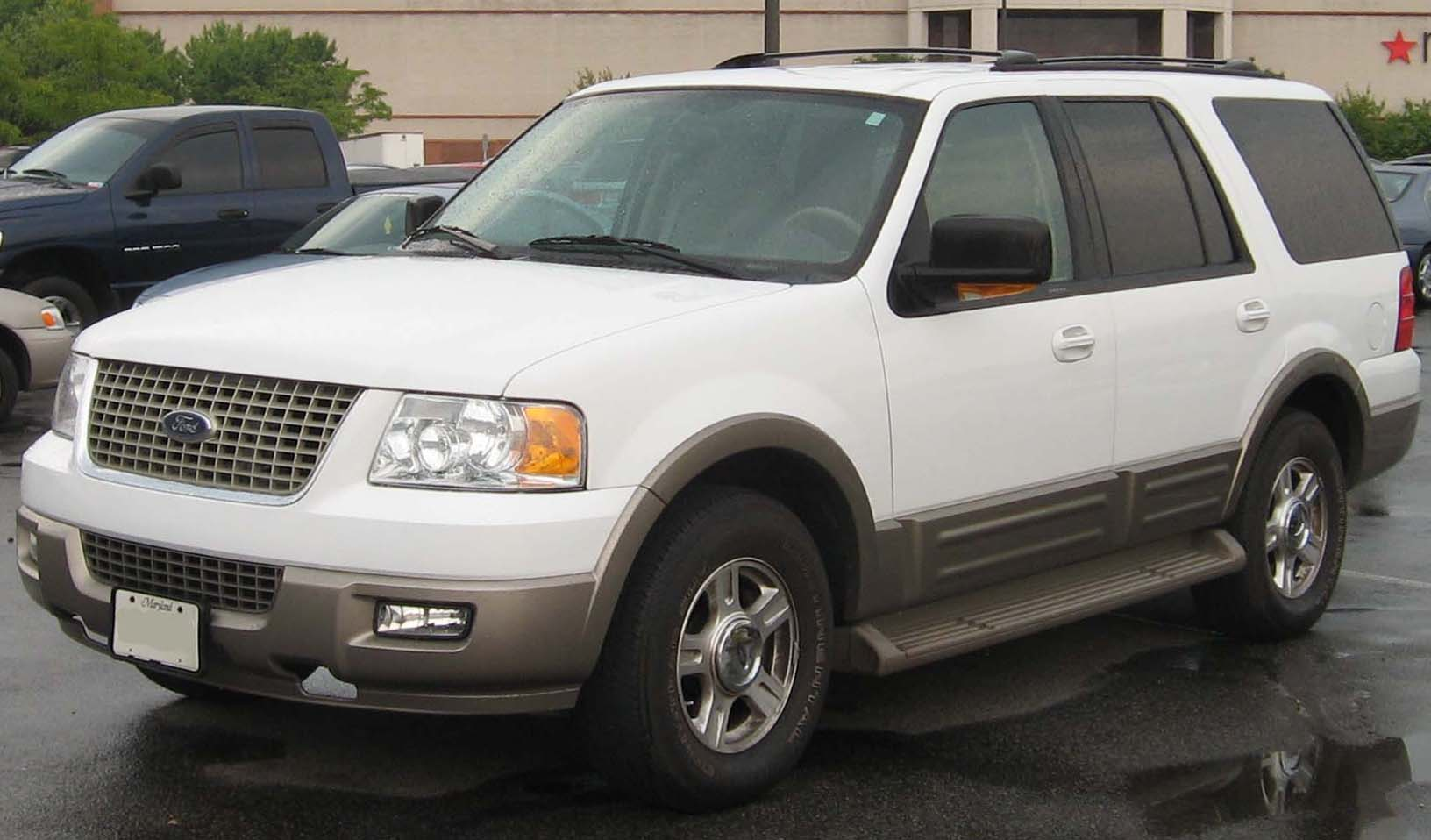

Overview
- Model code: U222
- Production: March 2002 – July 2006
- Model years: 2003–2006
- Assembly: Wayne, Michigan, United States
- Designer: Tyler Blake (1999)

Body and chassis
- Related: Ford F-150; Lincoln Navigator

Powertrain
- Engine: 4.6 L Triton V8 (2003–2004); 5.4 L Triton V8 (2003–2004); 5.4 L 3-valve Triton V8 (2005–2006)
- Transmission: 4-speed 4R70W automatic (2003–2004); 4-speed 4R75E automatic (2005–2006) Transfer case (4×4 models) 2-speed BorgWarner 4416; High range ratio: 1.00:1; Low range ratio: 2.62:1

Dimensions
- Wheelbase: 119.0 in (3,023 mm)
- Length: 205.8 in (5,227 mm)
- Width: 78.7 in (1,999 mm)
- Height: 2005–2006 4WD: 76.6 in (1,946 mm); 2005–2006 2WD: 76.7 in (1,948 mm); 2003–2004: 77.6 in (1,971 mm)

The redesigned second-generation Expedition was developed under the U222 program code name from 1996 to 2002, under Ford chief vehicle engineer Steve von Foerster and chief program engineer John Krafcik from 1998 to 2002. Design work began in 1997, with a proposal by Tyler Blake being chosen by management and frozen for production in 1999. UN93-body mules were spotted testing in 2000, with full prototypes running from late 2000. The new Expedition was unveiled at the 2002 North American International Auto Show, in January. It was launched in May 2002 for the 2003 model year and featured a new four-wheel independent long-travel suspension system, becoming the first full-size sport utility vehicle to use a fully independent suspension.

The new independent rear suspension (IRS) was perceived as being controversial by some at the time of its introduction. A misconception was that the Expedition's towing and off-road capabilities would be reduced, in comparison to the previous generation's rear live axle. Nevertheless, underbody obstacle clearance improved by half an inch, and up to two inches under the axle differentials. The new suspension reduces rear unsprung mass by 110 pounds (50 kg), and allows for a full 9.4 inches (240 mm) of suspension travel (how much the wheels can travel up or down) improving its ability to traverse uneven terrain for improved control and ride quality. The four-wheel independent long-travel suspension itself is a purpose-built version of race suspensions found on off-road desert race vehicles.

The Expedition also gained a hydroformed fully boxed frame providing a 70 percent improvement in torsional stiffness. Towing capacity increased by 800 lb (360 kg) for a maximum towing capacity of 8,900 lb (4,000 kg) when properly equipped with the appropriate axle ratio and heavy-duty trailer towing package. Payload capacity was increased to a maximum of 1,614 lb (732 kg). Models equipped with the heavy-duty trailer towing package received a heavy duty 9.75" rear differential and axle combination compared to the 8.8" of the standard version.

Along with the high towing capability came all-new steering, braking and electronic systems to help the Expedition better control and maneuver long heavy trailers. Adaptive variable assist power rack-and-pinion steering was introduced along with the largest brake rotors in the segment at that time (13.5 inches (340 mm) up front, 13 inches (330 mm) in back) with brake calipers 100 percent stiffer than the previous generation Expedition. The four-speed 4R70W automatic transmission received all-new control software to allow the transmission to automatically adjust to the demands of towing, using new computer logic that recognizes changes in load and road conditions.

The automatic full-time ControlTrac four-wheel-drive system remained available, with an uprated two-speed dual range BorgWarner 4416 transfer case. The new transfer case featured an updated intelligent locking center multi-disc differential with front-to-rear "torque biasing" capability in Auto mode. A new dedicated microprocessor with new control software was added allowing the system to detect different terrain and surface conditions to predict traction loss before it happens. Two High mode was also reintroduced. Four-wheel electronic traction control was now available as an option, and simulated front and rear differential locks.

The V8 engines offered on the previous generation were carried over, but not without major changes and improvements. Both the 4.6 L and 5.4 L Triton V8 engines received further refinements in design and overall efficiency. The Expedition qualified as an Ultra Low Emission Vehicle (ULEV) and was certified under the Environmental Protection Agency Tier 2 regulations one year earlier than required. The 4.6 L engine received an all-new redesigned cast aluminium engine block optimized for weight reduction and NVH improvements. The 5.4 L engine received an all-new redesigned cast-iron engine block with computer-designed ribbing and bracing, along with thicker side skirts and reinforcement at the oil pan flange. The new engine block helped reduce engine vibration and unwanted noise while providing refined performance.

Both engines featured piston skirts coated with a Teflon-based friction-reducing material, and fitted with low-tension, low oil consumption rings. In addition, a new fail-safe cooling mode provided protection even in the case of a catastrophic coolant loss (such as a punctured radiator). In the event of coolant loss, the engine control unit shuts off fuel to alternate cylinders to reduce the risk of engine damage from overheating. The valves continue to operate, in order to pump cooling air through the cylinders. The cooling system was designed to maintain an ideal engine temperature even when subjected to a prolonged 15 percent gradient in 46 °C (115 °F) weather. A returnless fuel supply system helped to reduce evaporative emissions by providing consistent pressure to the fuel injectors through a high-pressure pump.

New active hydraulic engine mounts were introduced to prevent the powertrain from inducing vibrations into the chassis. By optimizing these engine mounts, the engine block can act as a mass damper, absorbing chassis resonance, improving ride comfort.

Expedition's passenger cabin was better sealed than before, in an effort to eliminate intrusive outside noise from reaching the occupants. Wind, powertrain, road and vehicle body noise was reduced by improving interior acoustics through new damping materials, a total of 10 shear-style isolating body mounts, heavier sealing of body and panels, redesigned rubber door seals, and extensive use of interior structural acoustic foam in the upper B-pillars, upper and lower D-pillars and floor pan. Road noise was reduced by 2 decibels, body air leakage reduced by 56 percent, chances for sealant noise disturbances reduced from 15 percent to less than 0.5 percent and wind noise measured at 80 mph (130 km/h) was reduced from 35 sones to a world class level of 29 sones.

The Expedition also received a thorough exterior and interior cosmetic redesign. Expedition featured an all-new front fascia, grille work, headlamps, body trim, rear fascia, tail lamps and liftgate. Interior fit and finish were improved with an all-new interior featuring new dash, door panels, genuine aluminium trim, and plush carpeting. Premium perforated leather seating surfaces were standard on Expedition Eddie Bauer (optional on Expedition XLT). Expedition FX4 models featured all of Expedition's optional off-road equipment as standard equipment. Expedition's drag coefficient was 0.41 Cd.

Three-row seating was standard with all-new manual fold-flat stow away third row seats. No longer did owners have to remove the third rows seats for more storage. The third row could simply "disappear" into the floor. Power assisted PowerFold fold-flat third row seating was available as an optional extra. Available features included in-dash CD-ROM–based navigation system, DVD based rear entertainment system, ultrasonic rear park assist/back up sensors, power moon roof, power adjustable accelerator and brake pedals (introduced on the first generation Expedition), Gentex auto dimming electrochromatic rear view mirror, turn signals, side marker lights and reflectors, second-row captain's chair luxury seating, premium audiophile sound system with in-dash six-disc CD changer and rear subwoofer and four-wheel independent pneumatic air-ride suspension system.

=== Powertrains ===
Model year	Type/model	Power	Torque	Transmission
2003–2004	4.6 L (281 cu in) 16-valve SOHC Triton V8 gasoline	232 hp (173 kW; 235 PS)	291 lb⋅ft (395 N⋅m)	4-speed 4R70W automatic
2003–2004	5.4 L (330 cu in) 16-valve SOHC Triton V8 gasoline	260 hp (194 kW; 264 PS)	350 lb⋅ft (475 N⋅m)	4-speed 4R70W automatic
2005–2006	5.4 L (330 cu in) 24-valve SOHC VCT Triton V8 gasoline	300 hp (224 kW; 304 PS)	365 lb⋅ft (495 N⋅m)	4-speed 4R75E automatic

=== Safety and security ===
Like the generation before, a two airbags supplementary restraint system (SRS) with 2-way occupant protection was standard on Expedition. The dual front SRS air bags now included the Personal Safety System (PSS). PSS would tailor air bag deployment for driver and first passenger and included occupant classification, seat position, crash severity, safety belt pretensioner, load-limiting retractor and safety belt buckle usage sensors.

A new optional four-air-bag supplementary restraint system (SRS) with 6-way occupant protection was also available. This new air bag system included Safety Canopy dual side curtain air bags for head, upper torso and rollover protection. Safety Canopy would deploy along the A, B and C-pillars down to the vehicle's beltline. Safety Canopy could remain inflated after deployment for extended protection and replaced the dual front side airbags featured on the first-generation Expedition.

Other features included side-intrusion door beams, security approach lamps, SecuriLock with smart key and engine immobilizer, BeltMinder, three-point safety belts for all rows of seating, post-crash fuel pump shut-off, tire pressure monitoring system (TPMS) and four-wheel, four-sensor, four-channel anti-lock braking system (ABS) with electronic brakeforce distribution (EBD) and emergency brake assist (EBA). AdvanceTrac electronic stability control with traction control system was introduced as an optional extra. The electronic traction and stability mitigation system would expand to include roll stability control (RSC) for the 2005 model year.

NHTSA NCAP crash scores:
MY2003–2005		MY2006	
Frontal driver:	5/5 stars	Frontal driver:	5/5 stars
Frontal passenger:	5/5 stars	Frontal passenger:	5/5 stars
Side Driver:	Not tested	Side driver:	Not tested
Side rear passenger:	Not tested	Side rear passenger:	Not tested
Rollover Resistance (RWD):	Not tested	Rollover Resistance (RWD):	3/5 stars
Rollover Resistance (4WD):	Not tested	Rollover Resistance (4WD):	4/5 stars

=== Model year changes ===
==== 2003 ====
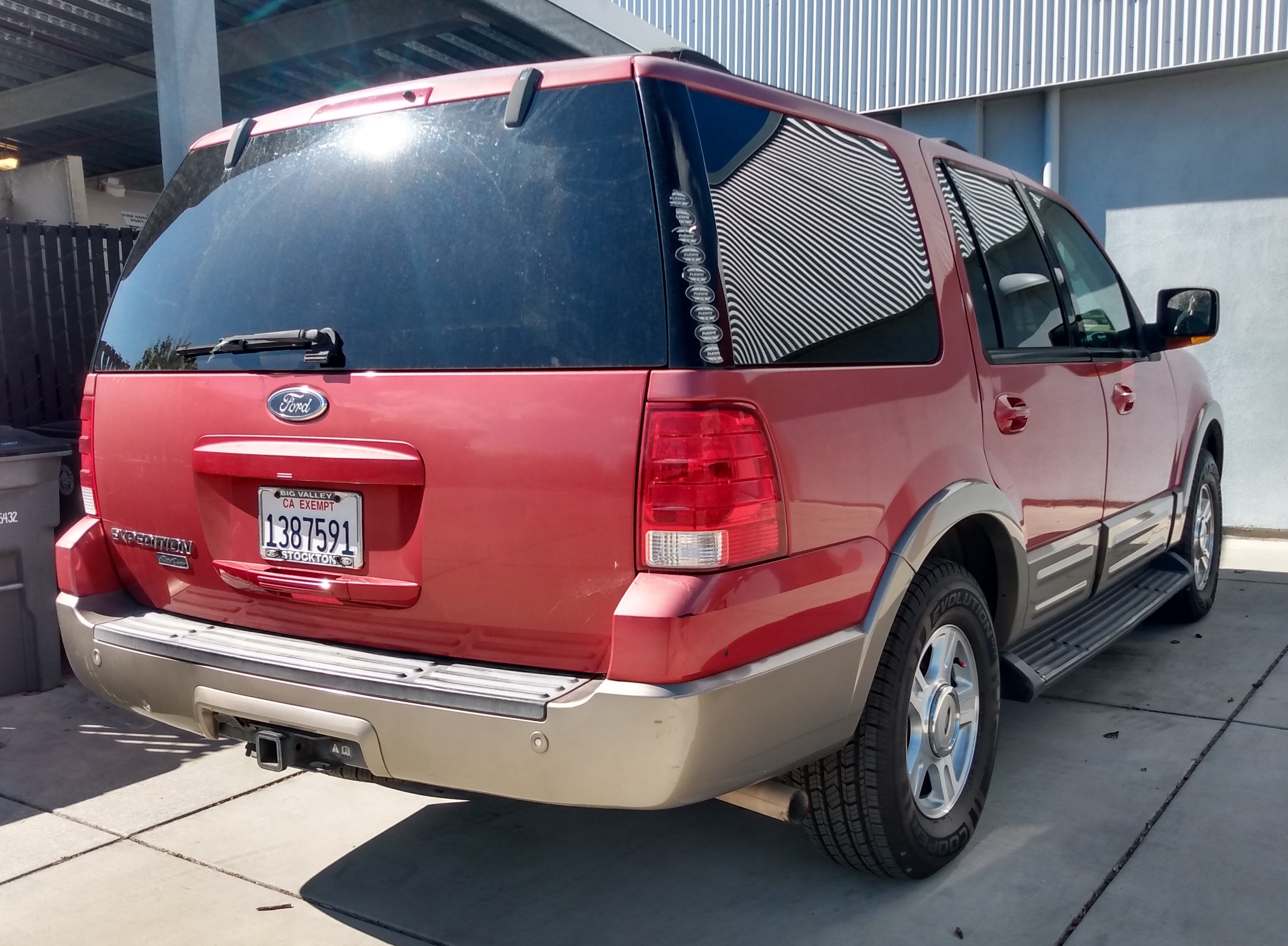
2003 Ford Expedition rear view

Before the 2003 model year ended, Ford updated the running boards on Expeditions equipped with the Eddie Bauer trim. Earlier in the model year, Eddie Bauer models had received standard black running boards. Toward the end of the model year, Arizona beige running boards were reintroduced to complement the Arizona beige body work which came standard on Eddie Bauer. Body colored running boards had previously been offered on the first-generation Expedition from 2000 to 2002.

==== 2004 ====
No major cosmetic or mechanical changes. The Expedition Eddie Bauer Premier model is reintroduced after being absent from the 2003 model trim line-up. Monochromatic paint work with blacked-out headlamps and special alloy wheels were standard on Eddie Bauer Premier versions. A new Expedition XLT Sport model is added with Dark Shadow grey exterior body trim. The FX4 trim level was renamed NBX.

==== 2005 ====
Expedition received new roof rails which replaced the traditional sliding cross-bar roof racks. A new high end Limited trim level replaced the Eddie Bauer Premier model (though the regular Eddie Bauer was still available) and featured chrome accented roof rails, chrome-clad aluminium wheels, PowerFold power assisted stowable side view mirrors and chrome tipped exhaust. An upper high end King Ranch trim level with Castano leather seating was also introduced. The base 4.6 L Triton V8 engine was dropped for the 2005 model year as the 5.4 L Triton V8 was made standard on all Expeditions and updated with 24-valve technology and variable valve timing. The Expedition also received a significantly updated version of the four-speed 4R70W automatic transmission.

The new four-speed automatic transmission, now called 4R75E, featured fully electronic Smart Shift technology. A turbine speed sensor improved transmission control and provided the basis for the fully electronic shift scheduling. The transmission's microprocessor speeds were improved for better responsiveness and precision of the control system. The transmission was continuously learning, and would calculate the torque in the next gear and schedule shift points based on the Expedition's projected performance in the next gear. For 2005 model Expeditions, the 4R75E transmission is designated by the letter "B" on the manufacturer's safety compliance certification label, located in the driver's-side doorjamb. For 2006 model Expeditions, the 4R75E transmission is designated by the letter "Q".

==== 2006 ====
No major cosmetic or mechanical changes. Last year model for the U222. The Gentex auto-dimming rearview mirrors were updated. Two new exterior colors were added: Pewter Metallic and Dark Copper Metallic. The Medium Flint Grey interior color was also added to Limited models later on within the model year. Chrome tipped exhaust was made standard on King Ranch models. 2006 would be the last year model for the NBX trim. The ultrasonic rear park assist and Safety Canopy side curtain airbags were offered as standalone options. Adjustable headrests were also added to the front seats to replace the one piece units.

==== Russian Moscow–Chukotka overland expedition ====
On April 12, 2006, three second-generation full-size Ford Expedition Eddie Bauer vehicles completed a 32-day overland expedition from Moscow to Chukotka. This was a 28,000-mile (45,000 km) trip across North Asia and the Arctic Tundra. Six team members consisted of leaders Alexey Mikhailov and Alexander Borodin; technical director Andrey Rodionov; and professional off-road drivers Sergey Goryachev, Victor Parshikov, and Alexey Simakin. The route took them on permafrost and crossed the Arctic Circle twice. Visited landmarks included where American aviator Carl Ben Eielson was lost, and the birthplace of Russian explorer Semyon Dezhnev. The northernmost point on the route was latitude 69°42′ North (Pevek). The easternmost point visited was longitude 169°40′ West (Cape Dezhnev). Temperatures reached −32 °F (−36 °C) and the team encountered whiteouts and a polar cyclone. An estimated 200 kilograms (440 lb) of snow was removed from each of the vehicles on the following day.

The vehicles were modified with front end guards along with front and rear utility bumpers, winches, safari roof racks, high-powered off-road lights and extra underbody plating for the engines. Two of the vehicles towed a dual axle utility trailer. Two were also equipped with caterpillar track systems supplied by Mattracks. The rubber track systems were only used when off-road conditions became too demanding for conventional tires. The rear stabilizer bar failed on both vehicles fitted with the Mattracks system. The vehicles were also equipped with gas stoves (to prepare food) and high-capacity auxiliary fuel tanks (mounted in the rear cargo bay) and sometimes run on poor-quality gasoline.

== Third generation (2007) ==
Third generation
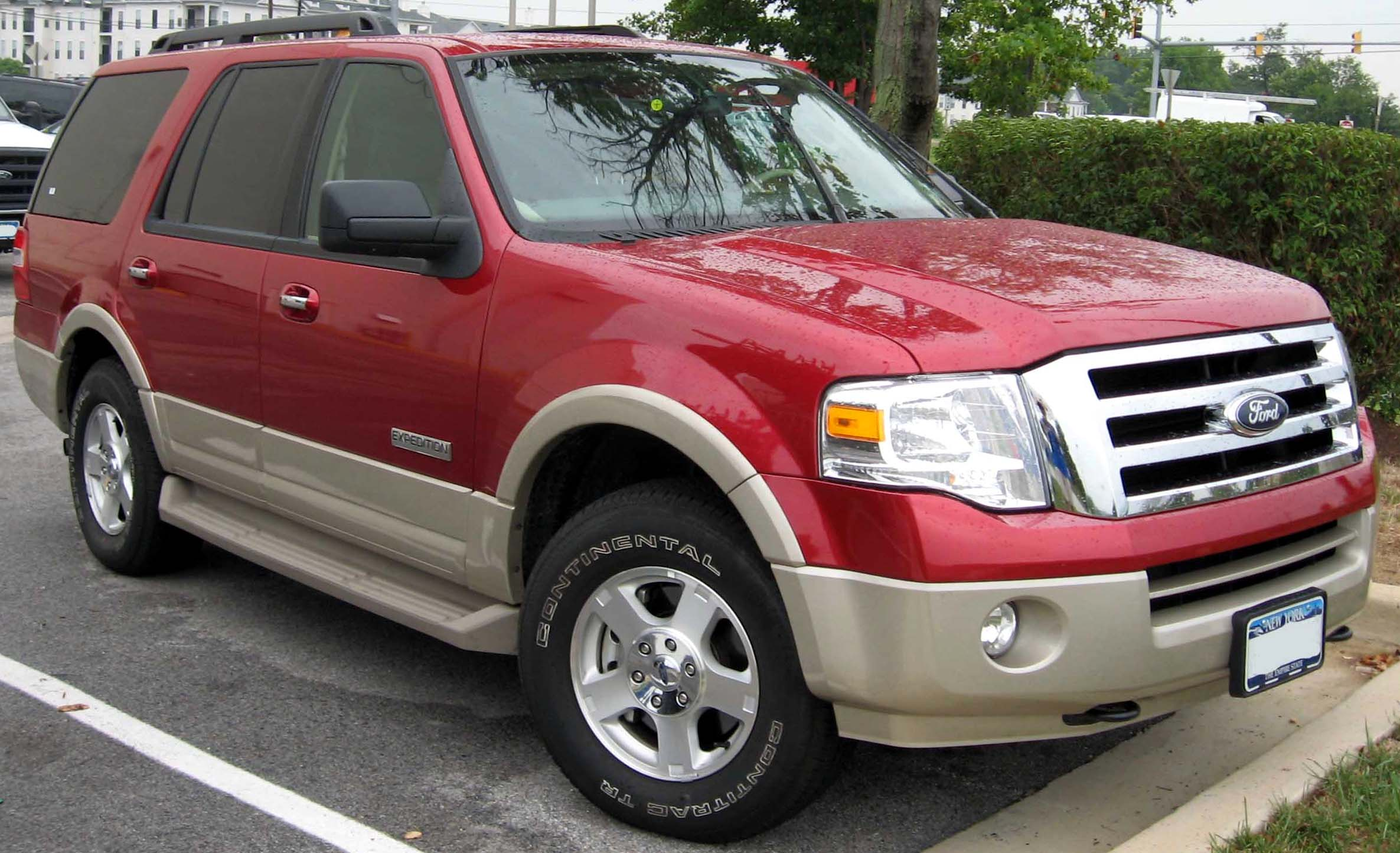

Overview
- Model code: U324
- Also called: Ford Expedition Special Service Vehicle
- Production: August 2, 2006 – July 2, 2017
- Model years: 2007–2017
- Assembly: Wayne, Michigan, United States (2007–2009); Louisville, Kentucky, United States (2009–2017)

Body and chassis
- Platform: Ford T1 platform
- Related: Ford F-150; Lincoln Mark LT; Lincoln Navigator

Powertrain
- Engine: 5.4L Triton 24V V8 (2007–2014); 3.5L EcoBoost V6 (2015–2017)
- Transmission: 6-speed 6R75 automatic 6-speed 6R80 automatic 6-speed 6R80 SelectShift automatic Transfer case (4×4 models) 2-speed BorgWarner 4417; High range ratio: 1.00:1; Low range ratio: 2.64:1

Dimensions
- Wheelbase: 119.0 in (3,023 mm)
- Length: 206.5 in (5,245 mm)
- Width: 78.8 in (2,002 mm)
- Height: SWB: 77.2 in (1,961 mm); Eddie Bauer: 78.3 in (1,989 mm)
- Curb weight: 5,801 lb (2,631 kg) (standard); 6,071 lb (2,754 kg) (EL)

In 2006, Ford introduced the third generation of the Expedition developed under the U324 program code name which was an updated version of the second generation Expedition, now using a new ladder frame architecture called T1, an evolution of 11th generation P221 F-150 architecture. Most of the improvements were mechanical in nature, and included a sheet metal refresh and redesigned interior with upgraded materials, as well as a new long wheelbase version, called Expedition EL in the U.S. and Expedition Max in other markets.

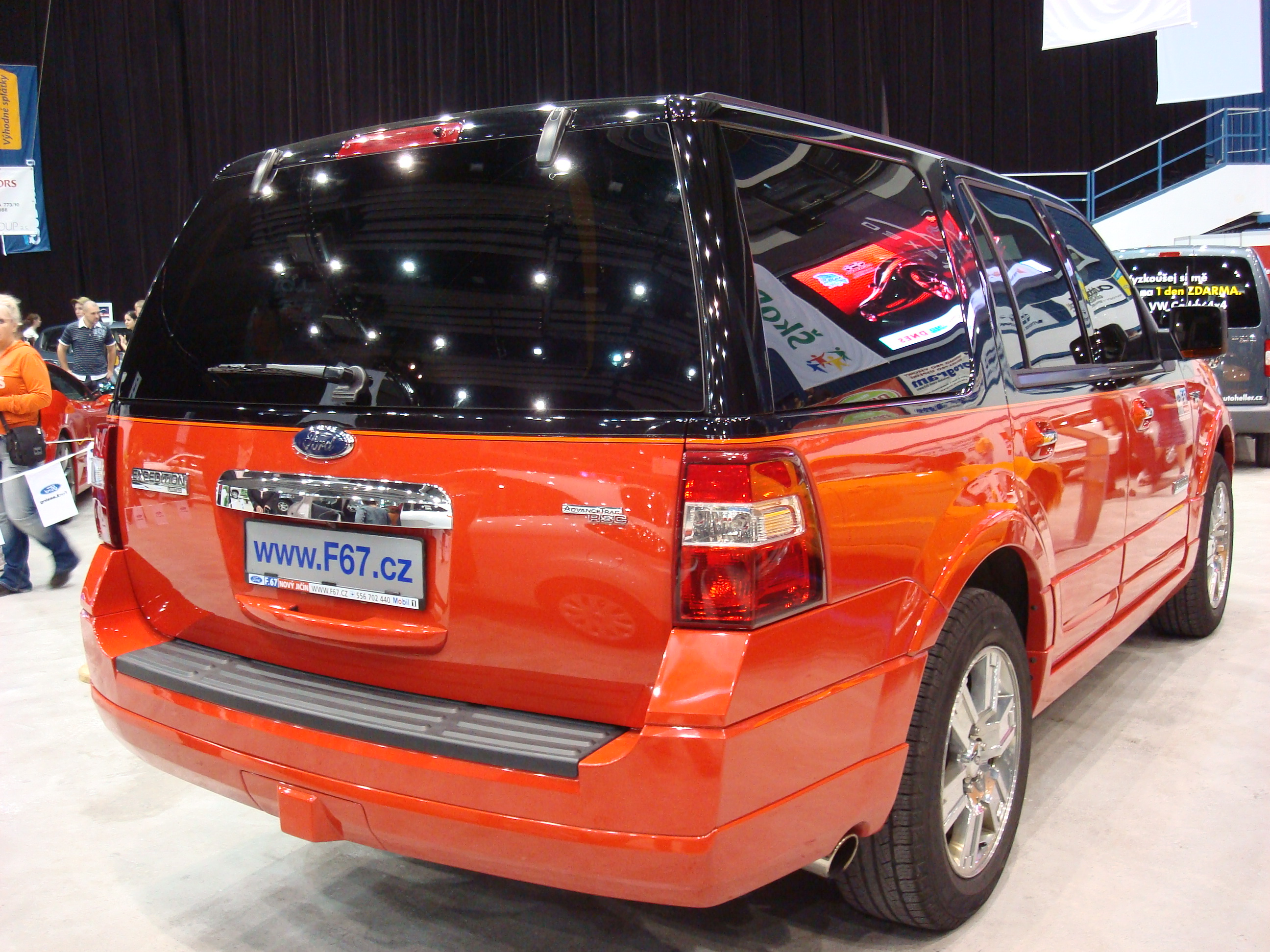
2008 Ford Expedition Funkmaster Flex edition

The high-strength hydroformed fully boxed Ford T platform (chassis) was a modified version of the half-ton platform from the Ford F-150. The new T1 platform replaced the one dating to the original model, and provides 10 percent more torsional rigidity. T1 incorporates a four-wheel independent long-travel suspension system (first introduced on the second generation) with redesigned suspension geometry and an all-new five-link rear suspension with new rear lower control-arms. As with previous model years, the suspension system could be had with adaptive pneumatic air-ride springs.

Ford's new 6-speed 6R75 intelligent automatic transmission with dual overdrive gears was introduced. The transmission featured push-button overdrive lock-out, electronic shift scheduling, adaptive shift algorithms and a mechatronic transmission control module (TCM) that would save adaptive shift data in keep alive memory (KAM). This safeguarded against complete data loss in case of a power failure (such as disconnecting the battery). In the event of a power failure, the mechatronic unit would simply read the last saved data entry from the system's memory, thus, the transmission did not have to completely relearn the owner's driving style.

Additionally, the Expedition is powered by the same 5.4L Triton V8 engine from the previous generation, rated at 300 hp (220 kW) and 365 lb⋅ft (495 N⋅m) of torque. When properly equipped with the heavy-duty trailer towing package, it can tow up to 9,200 pounds (4,200 kg). Expedition is classed under the Tier 2, Bin 5 / ULEV 2 Ultra Low Emission Vehicle environmental classification.

Off-road geometry figures for approach, departure and ramp breakover angles are 22°, 21°, and 18° respectively. Minimum running (lowest point) ground clearance is 8.7 inches (220 mm). Underbody (overall) ground clearance is 9.1 inches (230 mm).

Selectable automatic full-time Control Trac four-wheel drive continues to be offered, and uses a two-speed dual range BorgWarner 4417 transfer case with intelligent locking center multi-disc differential and "torque biasing" capability. Four-wheel electronic traction control is standard and off-road underbody skid plate armor is optional. A new default off-road program with throttle response recalibration was added, and is automatically activated when Four Low (lock) mode is selected. Expedition can achieve an off-road crawl ratio of 41.06:1 with a low range ratio of 2.64:1 and rear axle ratio of 3.73:1.

The SUV also underwent a nip/tuck with a few cosmetic enhancements, both inside and out. Expedition's front end now featured Ford's signature three "hollow-bar" grille to complement the SUV's close relation to the F-150 and Super Duty pickups. New complex stepped style multifaceted headlamps, side view mirrors with updated LED lane departure indicators, sleeker body work and redesigned tail lamps were also added. The interior received a new dash, which would eventually appear on the 2008 Super Duty, new center console, and redesigned first row captains chairs, door panels and interior trim.

To further reduce outside noise intrusion for quieter, more isolated ride comfort, new SoundScreen laminated acoustic and solar tinted windshield was added with thicker laminated side window glass.

The new SUV was unveiled at the Houston Auto Show rather than at the North American International Auto Show, the Greater Los Angeles Auto Show, or the New York International Auto Show where most new models are, as 20 percent of all Expedition sales are in Texas. The third generation Expedition went on sale in August 2006. The first 2007 Expedition to roll off a Ford assembly line was donated by Ford to the Peter family of Jamaica, Queens, New York as part of an episode of the American Broadcasting Company series Extreme Makeover: Home Edition that aired May 7, 2006.

In late 2014, the third generation standard wheelbase U324 Expedition and long-wheelbase U354 Expedition EL/Max underwent a cosmetic and mechanical refresh for the 2015 model year.

=== Powertrains ===
Model Year	Type/model	Power	Torque	Transmission
2007–2008	5.4 L (330 cu in) 24-valve SOHC VCT Triton V8 gasoline	300 hp (224 kW; 304 PS)	365 lb⋅ft (495 N⋅m)	6-speed 6R75 automatic
2009–2014	5.4 L (330 cu in) 24-valve SOHC VCT Triton V8 gasoline/E85 ethanol	320 hp (239 kW; 324 PS)	365 lb⋅ft (495 N⋅m)	6-speed 6R80 intelligent automatic
2015–2017	3.5 L (213 cu in) 24-valve DOHC Ti-VCT EcoBoost V6 gasoline	365 hp (272 kW; 370 PS)	420 lb⋅ft (569 N⋅m)	6-speed 6R80 SelectShift intelligent automatic

=== Model year changes ===
==== 2008 ====
For the 2008 model year, power deployable running boards became available, along with a rearview camera. The camera, which is mounted under the Expedition's center liftgate appliqué, utilizes the Gentex auto dimming rearview mirror's picture-in-mirror technology to display what it sees. Expedition King Ranch was also reintroduced after being absent from the 2007 model year trim line-up. Expedition XLT models now get body-colored lower bodywork, replacing the previous black plastic trim, and 2008 was the last year first-row bench seating was available.

==== 2009 ====
In July 2008, Ford's Wayne, Michigan, plant started production of the 2009 models until finishing the plant's run in December of that same year. In January 2009, production of the Expedition was relocated to the Kentucky Truck Assembly in Louisville along with its sister SUV, the Lincoln Navigator, and the Ford F-Series Super Duty. That plant used to build the Ford Excursion until 2005.

Expedition's 6-speed 6R75 automatic was replaced by an improved version, the 6-speed 6R80 automatic. It features more robust internals, new software logic, and a tow/haul mode (replacing the overdrive lock-out) that utilizes new uphill/downhill gradient shift logic for improved performance while towing or hauling heavy loads. The 6-speed automatic can compensate for altitude, grade/slope and present load conditions. The system also reduces the transmission's tendency to "hunt" for the right gear(s) and provides engine braking when descending hills. The nine-passenger front bench seating option has been discontinued for the 2009 model year, leaving only the eight-passenger seating option left with two front bucket seats and two rear bench seats. The chrome "Expedition" name plate badges have been removed from the left and right front doors. The chrome "Expedition" nameplate badge on the rear liftgate remains.

Additional features included the now-standard E85 capability, which can take gasoline, E85 (85% ethanol/15% gasoline), or any combination of the two, and the newly installed Easy Fuel capless fuel-filler system. The engine's power rating also increased to 320 hp (239 kW), while the torque rating stayed the same at 365 lb⋅ft (495 N⋅m) (both ratings on gasoline). A properly equipped 2009 Expedition could now tow up to 9,200 lb (4,200 kg) for the 4×2 version, and up to 9,000 lb (4,100 kg) for the 4×4 version.

The new entertainment features added to the 2009 model year included the optional Ford SYNC, and an all-new DVD-based, voice-activated, multi-entertainment/navigational system with an LCD touch screen. The rearview camera system now shows the video feed through the navigation screen; however, the rearview mirror is still used to show images on Expeditions not equipped with the navigation system. The new navigation system featured up to 10 gigabytes of storage space for more than 2,400 songs, a jukebox function, a screened photo display, iPod/Zune capability for downloading and recharging, a CD ripping function, integrated compatibility with cell phones, Bluetooth, the newly compatible Sirius Travel Link (which allowed drivers to access traffic, weather, sports, and local movie listings), and a "Route Guidance" mode for road and street information. The steering wheel also had a tilt feature and radio controls, including Ford SYNC buttons, allowing the driver to press the button and use voice commands to activate the system, which became standard on Eddie Bauer, Limited, and King Ranch. The tilt with radio control feature was optional on XLT models built at the Wayne plant, but after production moved to Louisville, it became standard. For accessory purposes, an HD radio could be installed upon request at a Ford dealership in the United States. New for 2009 were standard heated second-row outboard seats on the Limited and King Ranch models only with either the second row bench seat or the optional bucket seats.

==== 2010 ====
No major cosmetic or mechanical changes. For the 2010 model year, optional packages have now been renamed (to Rapid Specificated Order Codes) and upgraded (100S for XLT, 200S for Eddie Bauer, 300S for Limited, 400S for King Ranch) for the newer models. It was also announced that the 2010 models would now feature Ford's MyKey and trailer sway control as standard on all trims. The 2010 models were ranked sixth among the top 11 affordable large-size SUVs in U.S. News & World Report. A diesel version for the 2010 model year did not get past the planning stage. Rain-sensing windshield wipers were added as an optional extra for Eddie Bauer, but standard on the Limited and King Ranch versions.

==== 2011 ====
No major cosmetic or mechanical changes. HD Radio became standard on all trims, and a dual headrest DVD player system became an optional feature. Also, the Expedition now offered the newly designated standard XL trim with lower black cladding, while the XLT trim was upgraded along with a new XLT Premium trim with gold cladding, the latter replacing the Eddie Bauer level trim. Also, silver cladding was added as an exterior trim as part of a newly optional XLT Premium Sport Appearance Package. Both Limited and King Ranch trims receive new paint and interior trim. The Limited trim also has a chrome grille for a change.

==== 2012 ====
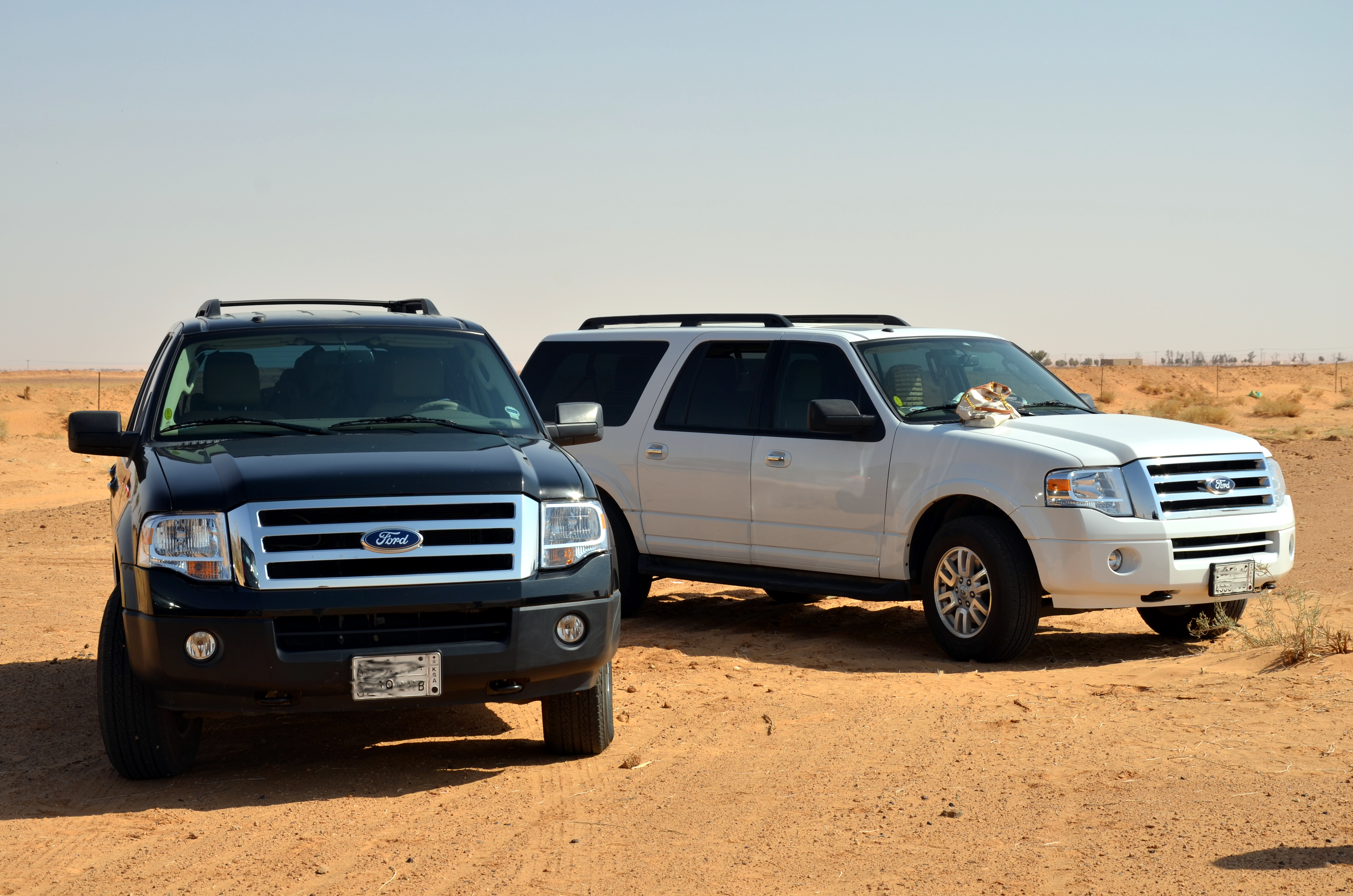
2012 Ford Expedition

No major cosmetic or mechanical changes. The second-row heated seat option was added to XLT Premium and the front park assist became a standard feature on the Limited and King Ranch trims.

==== 2013 ====
No major cosmetic changes; however, the XL trim and XLT Sport options were dropped, leaving only the XLT, XLT Premium, Limited, and King Ranch trims. Updates made to the 2013 models (which went on sale in August 2012) included the TowCommand trailer brake controller system that is bundled with the heavy-duty trailer towing package, a new internal shift control module which allows the six-speed automatic transmission to tailor shifts to engine demand, ten equipment levels, three new colors (Blue Jeans Metallic, Kodiak Brown Metallic and Ruby Red Metallic Tinted Clearcoat), and a new 20-inch chrome-clad aluminum wheels that was available on both the Limited and King Ranch trims. The latter trim also featured chrome roof racks and side mirrors. Another notable change can be found on the driver's instrumental panel, with the temperature and fuel gauge trading sides.

==== 2014 ====
No major cosmetic changes. Only three trims (XLT, Limited and King Ranch) were offered. The SiriusXM with Navlink and HD radio was added to the XLT as an optional feature. A new, quieter, mechanical Nivomat adaptive hydraulic load-leveling suspension system was available, in place of the adaptive pneumatic air-ride load-leveling suspension. When properly equipped, the Expedition continued to offer top-end towing capability with a braked trailer towing capacity of 9,200 pounds (4,200 kg).

==== 2015 ====
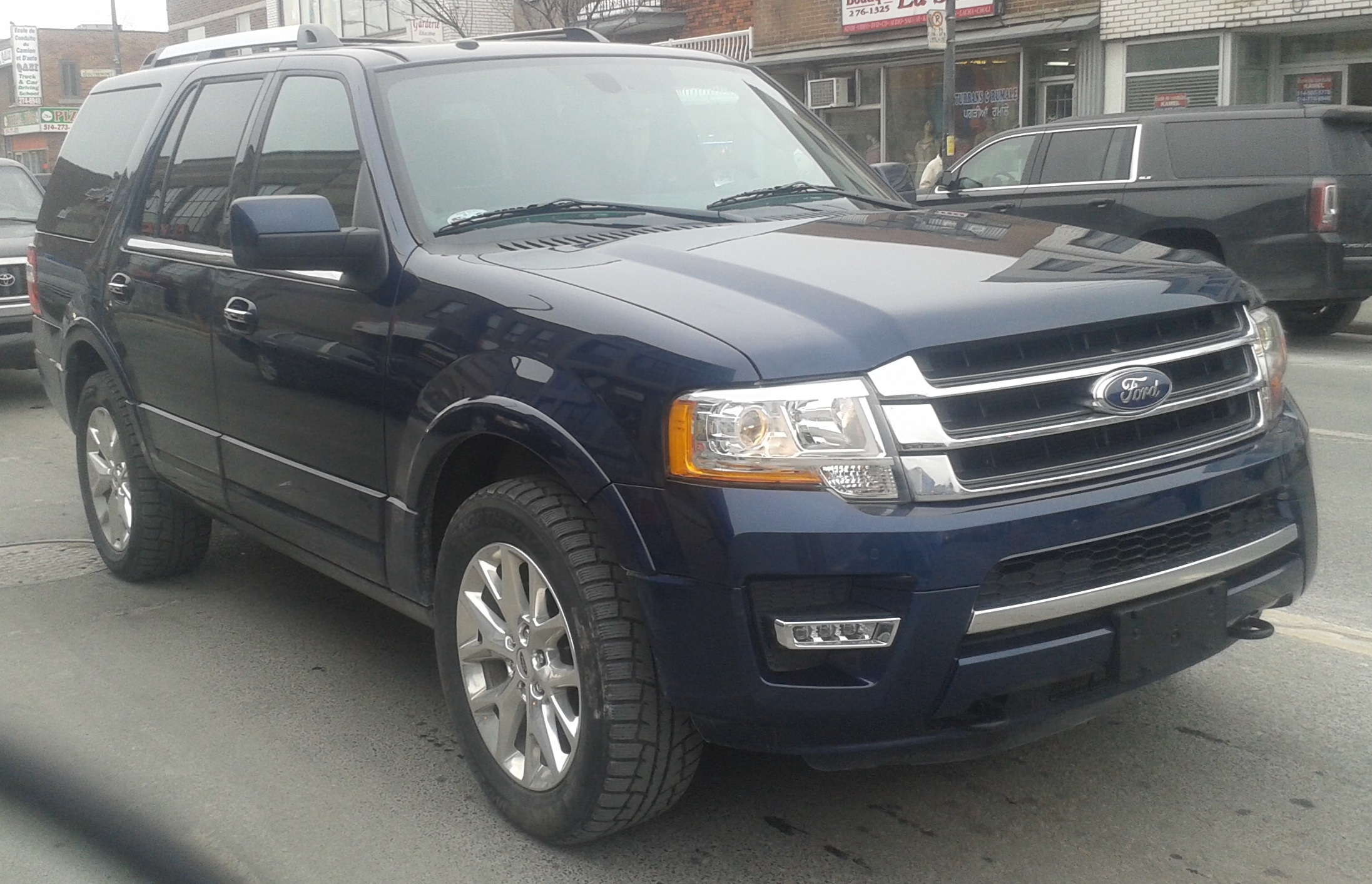
Facelifted 2015 Ford Expedition

On February 18, 2014, Ford introduced a mid-cycle refresh of the Expedition (U324) and Expedition EL (U354), dubbed the U3242 and U3542 respectively, for the 2015 model year. The "2" signified the second phase of the U324 and U354. They debuted at the Dallas–Fort Worth Auto Show on February 19, 2014, as Texas (especially Dallas and Houston) was a popular market. Despite a 27% drop in sales since 2008, Ford was committed to continuing producing the Expeditions. Ford started production on the updated Expedition (and Expedition EL, which continued to compete with the Chevrolet Suburban and GMC Yukon XL) around the first quarter of 2014 and placed the 2015 models in dealerships in July 2014. Ford announced that the three trim levels—XLT, Limited, and King Ranch—would continue to be offered along with a new top-of-the-line Platinum trim. On September 12, 2013 (the same day that GM unveiled its next-generation SUVs), Automobile Magazine posted a spy shot of the 2015 Expedition, which showed a repositioned tailpipe, and a more upright front fascia which bore a taller, wider grille that appeared to be inspired by the F-150 and Super Duty trucks.

Official photos released on February 18, 2014, revealed an all-new aggressive armadillo-like three-bar grille, which featured step-stacked bars evoking the appearance of stepped armor-plating on an armadillo's back. All-new thinner headlamps were added, in addition to an all-new front bumper with oversized lower air intake. The new bumper also featured a lower chrome bar and twin LED fog lamps flanking the chrome bar. Brightwork was added on the rear liftgate, and the tailpipe was repositioned straight, instead of making a 90-degree turn behind the right rear wheel.

The Expedition remained a body-on-frame SUV, allowing it to retain its heavy-duty truck underpinnings for towing and hauling needs. The full-size SUV received the 3.5L 24-valve DOHC Ti-VCT EcoBoost V6 engine featuring an aluminium engine block, twin-turbochargers, direct injection, and twin independent variable camshaft timing. The EcoBoost was rated at 365 horsepower and 420 lb-ft of torque, and replaced the 5.4L V8 as Ford wanted to make the SUV more fuel-efficient. As a result, the Expedition boosted its fuel economy to 16 mpg_{‑US} (15 L/100 km; 19 mpg_{‑imp}) (city) / 23 mpg_{‑US} (10 L/100 km; 28 mpg_{‑imp}) (highway) for the 2WD and 15 mpg_{‑US} (16 L/100 km; 18 mpg_{‑imp}) (city) / 21 mpg_{‑US} (11 L/100 km; 25 mpg_{‑imp}) (highway) for the 4WD, now being on par with GM's new full-size SUVs, which also boasted similar fuel economy ratings to the Expedition. In addition to the new engine, the Expedition received an updated 6-speed 6R80 SelectShift intelligent manumatic gearbox with manual shift mode. The Expedition also features a new electric power servo-assisted steering and Pull-Drift Compensation (PDC) which detects crosswinds and compensates for it.

The interior remained similar to the outgoing models, but with upgraded materials and a revised prominent center stack, now derived from the 2013–2014 F-150 rather than the 2008–2010 Super Duty. Also new is the latest version of the 8-inch MyFord Touch touchscreen infotainment and telematics system. Push-to-start engine ignition with intelligent access was added and the optional four-wheel-drive mode selector was revised and repositioned. The TowCommand paddle controls were repositioned over the four-wheel drive mode selector, to make way for revised audio and climate controls on the center stack.

The new features for 2015 included an optional, revised four-wheel independent suspension system with intelligent continuously controlled damping (CCD) system that alters suspension settings constantly based on 46 parameters and offers comfort, normal, and sport modes. Expedition is the first Ford vehicle in North America to have continuously controlled damping. Other new optional features included blind-spot information system (BLIS) with cross-traffic alert, and a rearview camera and apps for the infotainment system to help with towing and off-road driving, all of which is standard in the Platinum trim, whose seating and interior features included Brunello leather, a red wine color with tuxedo-stripe accents and French seamed stitching, or black leather with Agate Gray accents.

The selectable automatic full-time ControlTrac four-wheel drive system continued to be offered, but gains a trio of new off-road electronic systems in the form of Hill Ascent Assist (HAA), Hill Descent Control (HDC), and Ford Truck Apps (FTA). FTA gave off-road orientation/geometry, 4×4 system status, and traction control system status in real-time. The four-wheel electronic traction control system (brake differential locking control) was recalibrated to take into account the new EcoBoost V6's higher torque output and earlier torque delivery.

EcoBoost Performance

The heavyweight 6,155-pound (2,792 kg) as tested, 2015 Expedition Platinum with 3.5 liter EcoBoost V6 and selectable automatic full-time ControlTrac four-wheel drive was clocked from 0 to 60 mph (0 to 97 km/h) in 6.4 seconds. The full-size SUV can achieve 100 mph (160 km/h) in 18.2 seconds, 110 mph (180 km/h) in 24.3 seconds, and is electronically safety-limited to 113 mph (182 km/h). Expedition has a near 50:50 front:rear weight distribution and center of gravity positioned at 28.5 inches.

Expedition Platinum averaged 39.2 mph (63.1 km/h) in a 610-foot (190 m) slalom run and pulled 0.78g in roadholding skidpad testing. High speed emergency braking from 70 to 0 mph (113 to 0 km/h) was completed in 170 feet (57 yd; 52 m). In comparison, the Expedition's main rival took a full 10 feet (3.3 yd; 3.0 m) longer, completing the same emergency brake test in 180 feet (60 yd; 55 m).

==== 2016 ====
For the 2016 model year, most of the features that were introduced from 2015 were carried over. However, the Expedition began adding Ford's upgraded enhanced SYNC 3 to its trims, as an optional feature on the XLT and standard on Limited, King Ranch and Platinum. The Limited added Sony's Premium Audio System as a standard.

==== 2017 ====
In June 2016, Ford began selling the 2017 model year Expedition, with no major changes being made and continued to be offered in XLT, Limited, King Ranch, and Platinum level trims. This is the final year of the third generation Expedition and Expedition EL (U324) and (U354).

== Fourth generation (2018) ==
Fourth generation
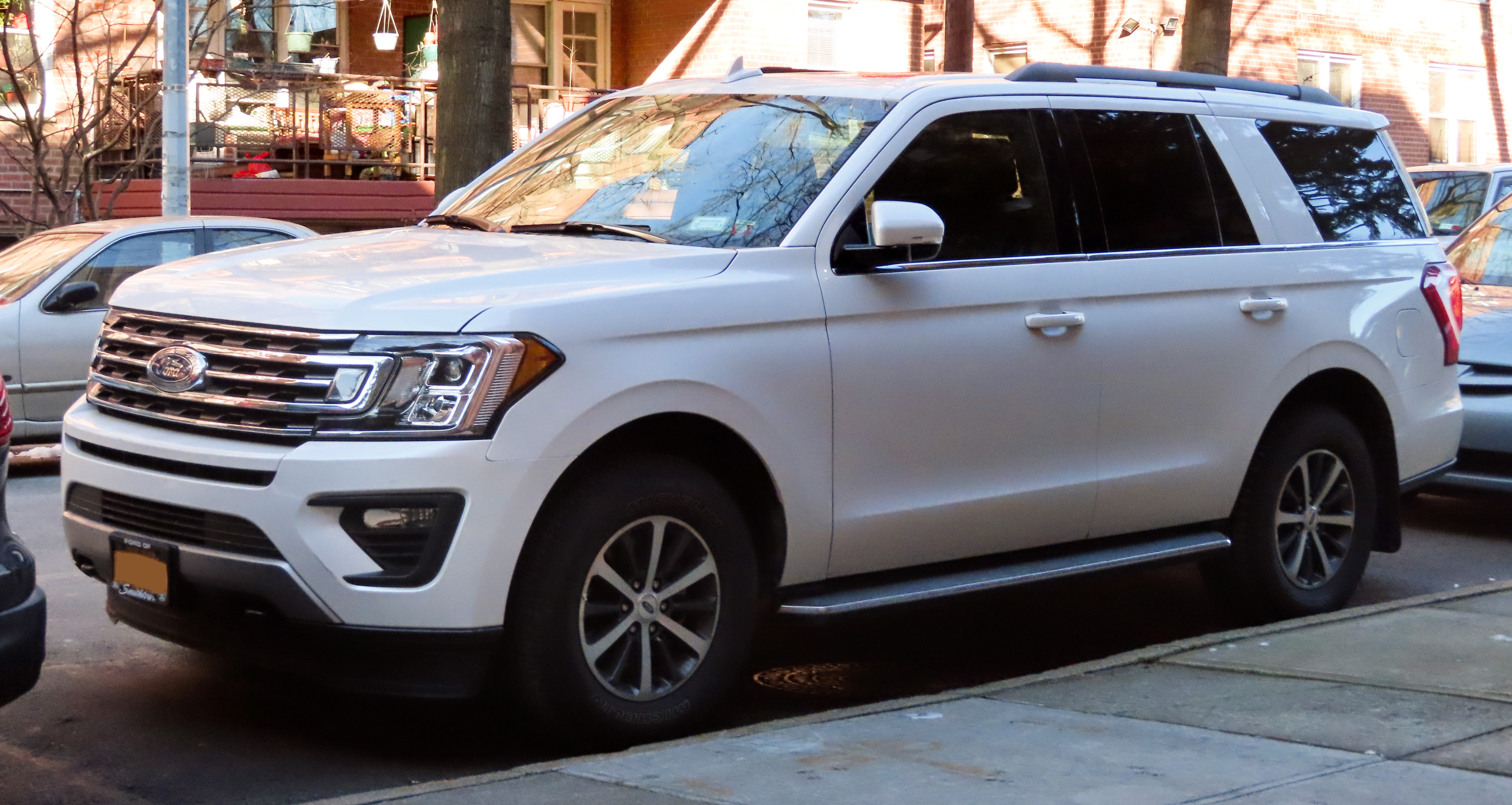

Overview
- Model code: U553
- Production: September 25, 2017 – 2024
- Model years: 2018–2024
- Assembly: Louisville, Kentucky, U.S. (Kentucky Truck Plant)

Body and chassis
- Platform: Ford T3 platform
- Related: Ford F-150; Lincoln Navigator

Powertrain
- Engine: 3.5L EcoBoost V6
- Transmission: 10-speed 10R80 SelectShift automatic Transfer case (4×4 models) 2-speed BorgWarner 4417; High range ratio: 1.00:1; Low range ratio: 2.64:1

Dimensions
- Wheelbase: 122.5 in (3,112 mm)
- Length: SWB: 210 in (5,334 mm)
- Width: 79.9 in (2,029 mm)
- Height: SWB: 76.5 in (1,943 mm)
- Curb weight: ≥ 5,368 pounds (2,435 kg)

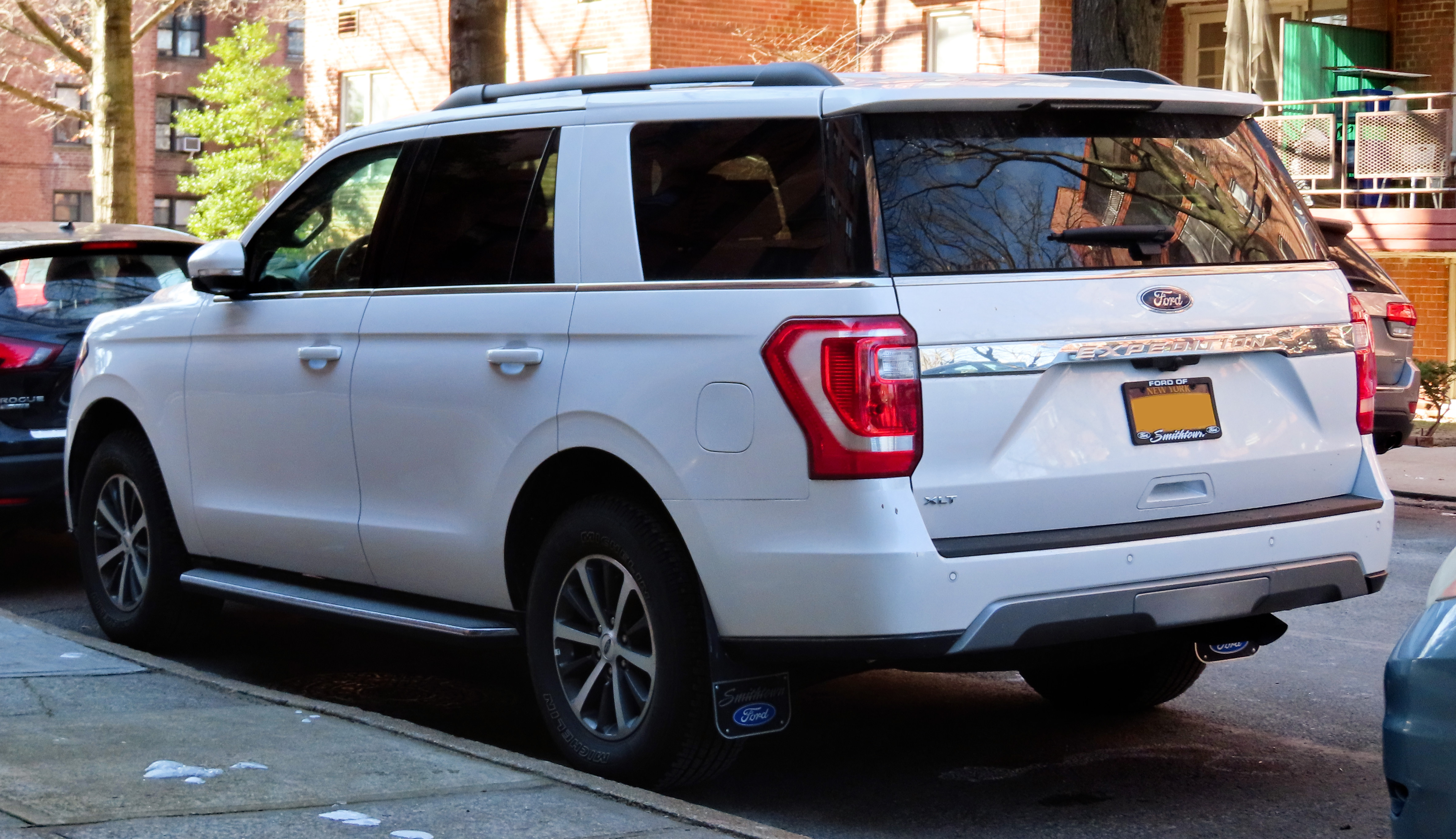
Rear view

The fourth-generation Expedition, known internally at Ford Motor Company as the "U553", was unveiled on February 7, 2017, at the Dallas Cowboys training facility, Ford Center in Frisco, Texas, ahead of its Chicago Auto Show debut. Production of the new Expedition started on September 25, 2017. The vehicles arrived at dealerships in November 2017.

The all-new Expedition features body-on-frame architecture with high-strength lightweight material construction consisting of boron steel and aluminum. The four-door body is constructed from aluminium-alloy, while the frame is constructed from boron steel. The U553 will move to the all-new half-ton hydroformed T3 platform (chassis), which is a modified version of the half-ton platform underpinning the P552 2015 Ford F-150. The T3 platform will use a new four-wheel independent suspension system design. Updated powertrain systems (engines and transmissions) including a Hybrid variant with proprietary parallel hybrid electric-drive system to help increase fuel efficiency are expected. Expedition will gain Ford's new 10-speed 10R80 SelectShift automatic transmission which will feature artificially intelligent shifting, electronic range select, manual shift mode, and be controlled via a rotary dial on the center console. The next-generation Expedition's chief engineer is Jackie Marshall DiMarco, who is also the chief engineer for the next-generation F-150 pickup.

The Expedition is one of the first vehicles in North America to use a new next-generation high speed Controller Area Network 3 (CAN-3) vehicle data bus system.

The Expedition is available with selectable automatic full-time four-wheel drive that routes torque through a two-speed dual range transfer case with electronic locking center multi-disc differential. A new electronic locking rear differential is available to augment the four-wheel-drive system. Both the center and rear locking systems are teamed with four-wheel electronic traction control (ETC), which simulates a locking front differential by ABS "brake locking" the front differential. The Expedition's off-road electronic aids Hill Descent Control (HDC) and Hill Ascent Assist (HAA) are joined by the Terrain Management System adapted from the Ford Raptor. Terrain Management is capable of working with 4L mode, like the Ford Raptor, and has seven drive modes to choose from which include Normal, Eco, Sport, Tow/Haul, Gravel/Snow, Mud/Ruts, and Sand. The four-wheel drive system has three direct drive modes which include 2H, 4A, and 4L. The 4H mode has been dropped from the selection, as the Terrain Management computer now controls the electronic center lock of the four-wheel drive system. Terrain Management engages the electronic center lock for a 50:50 front:rear torque split while in 4A direct drive mode, when the Mud/Ruts or Sand modes are selected. The 4L direct drive mode engages the electronic center lock regardless of the off-road drive mode selected. A "tap to lock/unlock" button is located near the drive mode dial for operation of the electronic rear lock.

Off-road geometry figures for approach, departure, and ramp breakover, improve slightly with 23.3°, 21.9°, and 21.4° of obstacle clearance. Minimum running (lowest point) ground clearance increases by a full inch, from 8.7 to 9.8 inches (220 to 250 mm).

The Expedition is certified by the Society of Automotive Engineers' independent SAE J2807 towing standard to tow a maximum 9,300 pounds (4,200 kg) of braked trailer. The tow rating increases by 100 pounds (45 kg) over the previous generation. Expedition will also feature Pro Trailer Backup Assist, a semi-autonomous system that allows the Expedition to reverse itself with a trailer coupled. The driver directs the system via a control dial, while the Expedition handles all steering and limits reversing speed.

Among the new features that have been incorporated into the fourth generation Expedition are a 360-degree camera and park assist system, along with optional safety features that use both camera and radar technology, and include automatic braking, lane-keep assist, active cruise control, and blind-spot monitors. In addition, there are two USB ports per row, four 12-volt outlets and a 120-volt household outlet. Ford has also partnered with Sling on a twin-screen rear entertainment system, as well as personal tablets on the vehicle's Wi-Fi. The Wi-Fi can be used on up to 10 devices and features Apple CarPlay and Android Auto capabilities compatible with Ford SYNC3 and Ford Pass. A dual vista panoramic sunroof is available as an optional feature.

The 2018 Expedition was only available in four trim levels, as the King Ranch trim was discontinued after the 2017 model year. The three primary trims, XLT, Limited, and the top-of-the-line Platinum, were available to regular customers, while the fourth trim, XL, was exclusive to rental companies, corporate fleets, and government agencies, as it did not have as many features as the other three trims. The Expedition retains its unique (standard) eight-passenger seating on all trims like before, with optional seven-passenger seating.

=== Safety and security features ===
All 2018 Expedition models carry a power four-wheel disc antilock brake system (ABS) with brake assist and Electronic Brakeforce Distribution (EBD), six standard airbags including a Safety Canopy System that provides side-curtain airbags with roll-fold technology and a rollover sensor, rear-door child-safety locks, a LATCH system (Lower Anchors and Tether Anchors for Children), an Individual Tire Pressure Monitoring System (TPMS), and a SOS Post-Crash Alert System.

The Expedition has an available Driver Assistance Package that equips the vehicle with smart driver-assist technology, including pre-collision assist with pedestrian detection and forward collision warning, lane-keeping assist, adaptive cruise control, auto high-beam headlamps, and rain-sensing wipers.

Standard security features include a SecuriLock Passive Anti-Theft System, a perimeter alarm, a personal safety system, MyKey, available inclination and intrusion sensors, as well as Ford's proprietary keypad entry system, marketed as SecuriCode.

=== Trim levels and packages ===
==== XLT ====
Starting off the 2018 Expedition lineup is the XLT trim, which is available in either 4×2 or 4×4 configurations, as well as in the MAX style. Standard features include cloth upholstery, keyless access with push-button start, eighteen-inch aluminum-alloy wheels, a 60/40 second-row bench seat with CenterSlide seat, Hill Start Assist and Hill Descent Control (4×4 models only), MyFord w/ SYNC radio with 4.3-inch LCD screen, SiriusXM satellite radio, a nine-speaker audio system, and a 3.5 L EcoBoost twin-turbo V6 gasoline engine with 375–400 horsepower (280–298 kW; 380–406 PS) and 470–480 pound-feet (637–651 N⋅m). of torque.

A trailer towing package, leather-trimmed seating surfaces, heated front and rear seats, SYNC 3 infotainment system with optional GPS navigation, a power panoramic moonroof, heated and ventilated front bucket seats, the FX4 Off-Road Package (4×4 models only), 20-inch aluminum-alloy wheels, and other comfort and convenience features are optional.

==== SSV ====
The 2018 Expedition SSV is a fleet-only version of the Expedition XLT, and offers similar standard equipment. The key difference is the transmission and engine are changed slightly for better durability in high-idling and high-speed environments as the SSV is designed for police use.

==== Limited ====
The 2018 Expedition Limited's key features include in-vehicle Wi-Fi with available SYNC Connect, a hands-free foot-activated lift gate, and standard 20-inch ultra-bright machined aluminum wheels with dark tarnish painted pockets. A 3.5-liter EcoBoost engine functions with a 10-speed SelectShift automatic transmission. The Limited also has a 23.3 US gal (88 L; 19.4 imp gal) fuel tank. A heavy-duty engine radiator and two-speed automatic four-wheel drive with neutral towing capability are optional.

==== Platinum ====
The top-of-the-line Platinum trim features high-end interior fit-and-finish and luxury interior and exterior appointments. The exterior lamps are all LED-based. The Platinum features a specific performance-tuned version of the 3.5-liter EcoBoost V6 with 400 horsepower (298 kW; 406 PS) and 480 pound-feet (651 N⋅m) of torque (using 93 octane fuel) mated to the 10-speed 10R80 SelectShift automatic transmission.

==== King Ranch ====
The King Ranch trim returned for the 2020 model year, slotted between the Limited and Platinum trim. As with the previous versions, the King Ranch logo is prominent on all three rows of seats, the floor mats, and the scuff plates, Stone Gray trim on bumpers, power running boards, roof rails, standard Del Rio leather on all seats, door trim, armrests, steering wheel, and center console, and roll-on machined aluminum wheels with darker painted pockets.

==== FX4 ====
An off-road FX4 package became available starting with the 2018 model year. This option, available to 4WD XLT level trims only and targeted towards the 20% of Expedition owners who use the vehicle for off-road purposes, is expected to compete with the Chevrolet Suburban and Tahoe Z71 package in both standard and MAX versions. Among the detailed features are electronic locking limited-slip rear differential, off-road-tuned shocks, all-terrain tires, skid plates, unique 18-inch cast-aluminum wheels, and chrome running boards.

==== XL STX ====
For the 2021 model year, Ford introduced the Expedition XL STX, which has a lower starting price than other Expedition trim levels. The Expedition XL STX lacks third-row seats, and has a split-bench second-row seat. It is only available in standard length, not the Max. Styling elements for the XL STX include a gloss-black grille and 18-inch aluminum wheels. A Heavy-Duty Trailer Tow Package is available.

=== Model year changes ===
==== 2019 ====
There were no major changes, as it carried some of the 2018 features over to the 2019 model year. Two new colors, Silver Spruce and Black Agate, were added to the color options.

==== 2020 ====
The King Ranch level trim was brought back for the 2020 model year, placing it above the Platinum trim. The desert gold color feature was introduced with this 2020 model year, but is being discontinued due to lack of interest from customers.

==== 2022 ====
For the 2022 model year, the Expedition and Expedition Max receive a mid-cycle refresh. The refresh includes revised front end styling, new aluminum-alloy wheel designs for all models, as well as a revised interior that is similar to that of the all-new 2021 Ford F-150, and includes an optional fully-digital reconfigurable instrument cluster, as well as a standard twelve-inch or optional fifteen-inch SYNC 4A touchscreen infotainment system display that now includes SiriusXM Satellite Radio with 360L, and connected GPS navigation on select models. A new off-road oriented Timberline trim, based on the mid-level XLT trim, adds unique exterior and interior styling, unique seating surfaces, and off-road oriented tires with unique aluminum-alloy wheels. A new Limited Stealth Performance Package includes a higher-output version of the standard 3.5L EcoBoost twin-turbo V6 gasoline engine (now with 440 horsepower (328 kW; 446 PS) and 510 lb⋅ft (691 N⋅m) of torque), and unique exterior styling cues.

=== Powertrain ===
The 2018 Expedition's die-cast aluminum 3.5 L EcoBoost V6 engine operates with a twin-independent variable camshaft timing (Ti-VCT) valvetrain, and a 10-speed automatic SelectShift transmission. The engine makes 375 horsepower (280 kW; 380 PS) and 470 lb⋅ft (637 N⋅m). of torque at 5,000 rpm in XLT and Limited trims, and 400 horsepower (298 kW; 406 PS) and 480 lb⋅ft (651 N⋅m). of torque at 5,000 rpm in the Platinum trim. It's backed up by a gasoline direct injection fuel delivery system with a single, stainless steel exhaust. The drive ratio is 3.15 on a standard 4×2; 3.31 on standard 4×4 and 4×2 Max; and 3.73 on a 4×4 Max. The engine's compression ratio is 10:5:1.

Engines
Model year	Type/model	Power	Torque	Notes
2018–2024	3.5 L (213.6 cu in) 24-valve DOHC Ti-VCT EcoBoost V6 gasoline with Start-Stop	2018–2021: 375 hp (280 kW; 380 PS) @ 5000 rpm 2022–2024: 380 hp (283 kW; 385 PS) @ 5000 rpm	2018–2021: 470 lb⋅ft (637 N⋅m) @ 3500 rpm 2022–2024: 470 lb⋅ft (637 N⋅m) @ 2250 rpm	2018–2024 XL and XLT, 2018–2021 Limited and King Ranch
2018–2024	3.5 L (213.6 cu in) 24-valve DOHC Ti-VCT EcoBoost V6 gasoline with Start-Stop	400 hp (298 kW; 406 PS) @ 5000 rpm	480 lb⋅ft (651 N⋅m) @ 3250 rpm	2018–2024 Platinum, 2022–2024 Limited and King Ranch
2022–2024	3.5 L (213.6 cu in) 24-valve DOHC Ti-VCT EcoBoost High-Output V6 gasoline with Start-Stop	440 hp (328 kW; 446 PS) @ 5000 rpm	510 lb⋅ft (691 N⋅m) @ 3250 rpm	Stealth Performance Package and Timberline only

Transmissions
Model year	Type/model
2018–2024	10-speed 10R80 SelectShift automatic

== Fifth generation (2025) ==
Fifth generation
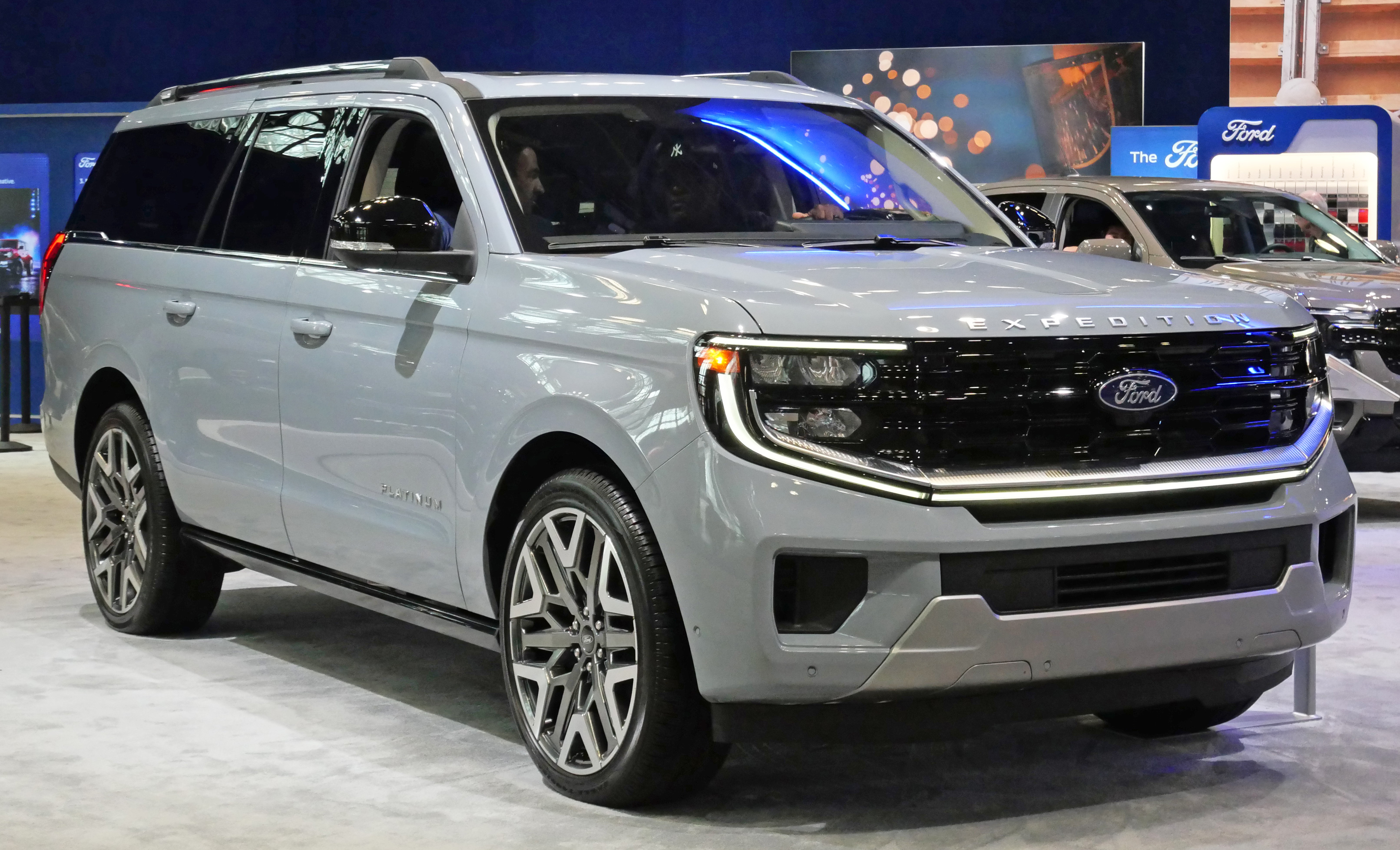

Overview
- Model code: U717
- Production: January 6, 2025 – present
- Model years: 2025–present
- Assembly: Louisville, Kentucky, U.S. (Kentucky Truck Assembly)

Body and chassis
- Platform: Ford T3 platform
- Related: Ford F-150; Lincoln Navigator

Powertrain
- Engine: Ford EcoBoost D35 3.5 L Twin-Turbo V6
- Transmission: Ford 10-speed 10R80 SelectShift automatic

Dimensions
- Wheelbase: SWB: 122.5 in (3,112 mm); MAX: 131.5 in (3,340 mm)
- Length: SWB: 209.9 in (5,331 mm); MAX: 221.7 in (5,631 mm)
- Width: 80.0 in (2,032 mm)
- Height: 78.1 in (1,984 mm)

The fifth-generation Ford Expedition was revealed on October 3, 2024.

The fifth-generation Expedition gains a significantly reworked liftgate, called the Ford Split Gate, a feature initially seen on the fifth-generation Navigator, where it is called the Lincoln Split Gate. The top half opens like a regular liftgate, while the lower half opens much like the tailgate of a pickup truck which can support a weight up to 500 lb (227 kg). This feature is similar to the split tailgate found on Range Rover models, as well as BMW's X5 and X7 models and the Lexus LX 570. The Split Gate also features a seatback as part of the optional Cargo Tailgate Manager.

The XL, XLT, and Limited trims for both standard and MAX models have been discontinued, with the King Ranch and Platinum trims being retained, while the new Active trim serves as the entry-level model. The Timberline off-road trim has been discontinued, and is replaced by the Tremor off-road trim in a first for Ford's SUVs, as the Tremor name was initially exclusive to its line of trucks as either an off-road package or a standalone trim, while its SUVs used the Timberline name for their off-road oriented models. The Expedition Tremor gains 33-inch General Grabber all-terrain tires, off-road auxiliary lighting within the grille, Raptor-inspired running boards, underbody protection for the fuel tank, front axle, and transfer case, retuned steering and suspension, and Tremor Orange accents. The Expedition Tremor also receives an increase in ground clearance of 10.6 inches, and gains specialized features such as Trail 1-Pedal, Rock Crawl Mode, and Trail Turn Assist. The Expedition Tremor receives the high-output variant of the 3.5-liter V6 EcoBoost engine as its sole engine option, which is also an option on the Platinum trim, while the standard 3.5-liter V6 EcoBoost turbochaged gasoline engine serves as the only engine option for the rest of the line. The 10-speed automatic is the sole transmission offering available for the fifth generation.

Inside, the fifth-generation Expedition receives the Ford Digital Experience, originally debuted on the 2025 Explorer, and serving as the Ford counterpart to Lincoln's Lincoln Digital Experience, which comes with WiFi hotspot, Alexa, Google Play, Google Maps, and Google Assistant built-in. Ford has also made BlueCruise available in 90 percent of the Expedition line, and comes with a 90-day free trial. A 24-inch panoramic display serves as the instrument cluster as well as displaying GPS and radio, and there is a 13.2-inch central touchscreen.

A new feature on the Expedition is the Flex Powered Console, in which the center console is capable of sliding back by almost 8 inches, allowing easier access for second-row passengers, as well as revealing a hidden storage compartment suitable for storing objects such as small bags, purses, and documents. Available as an option is another new feature called Third-Row Flexible Seating, in which the middle seat of the third row folds down independent from the rest of the bench, allowing for increased storage for particularly long items.

The fifth-generation Expedition is capable of towing 7,000 pounds standard, or 9,600 pounds when fitted with a weight-distributing hitch. It is available with Pro Trailer Hitch Assist and Pro Trailer Backup Assist.

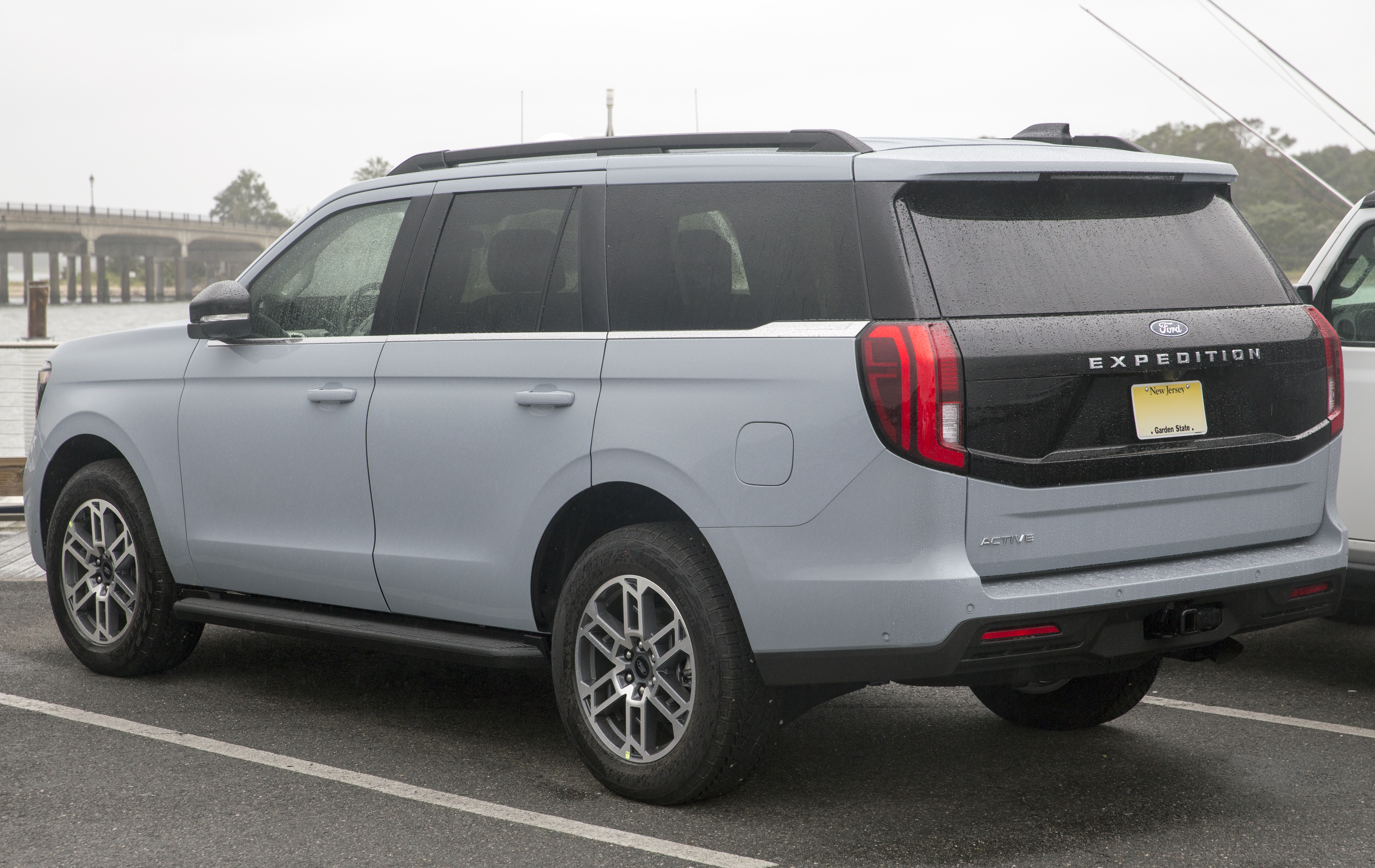
Ford Expedition Active (rear view; standard wheelbase)

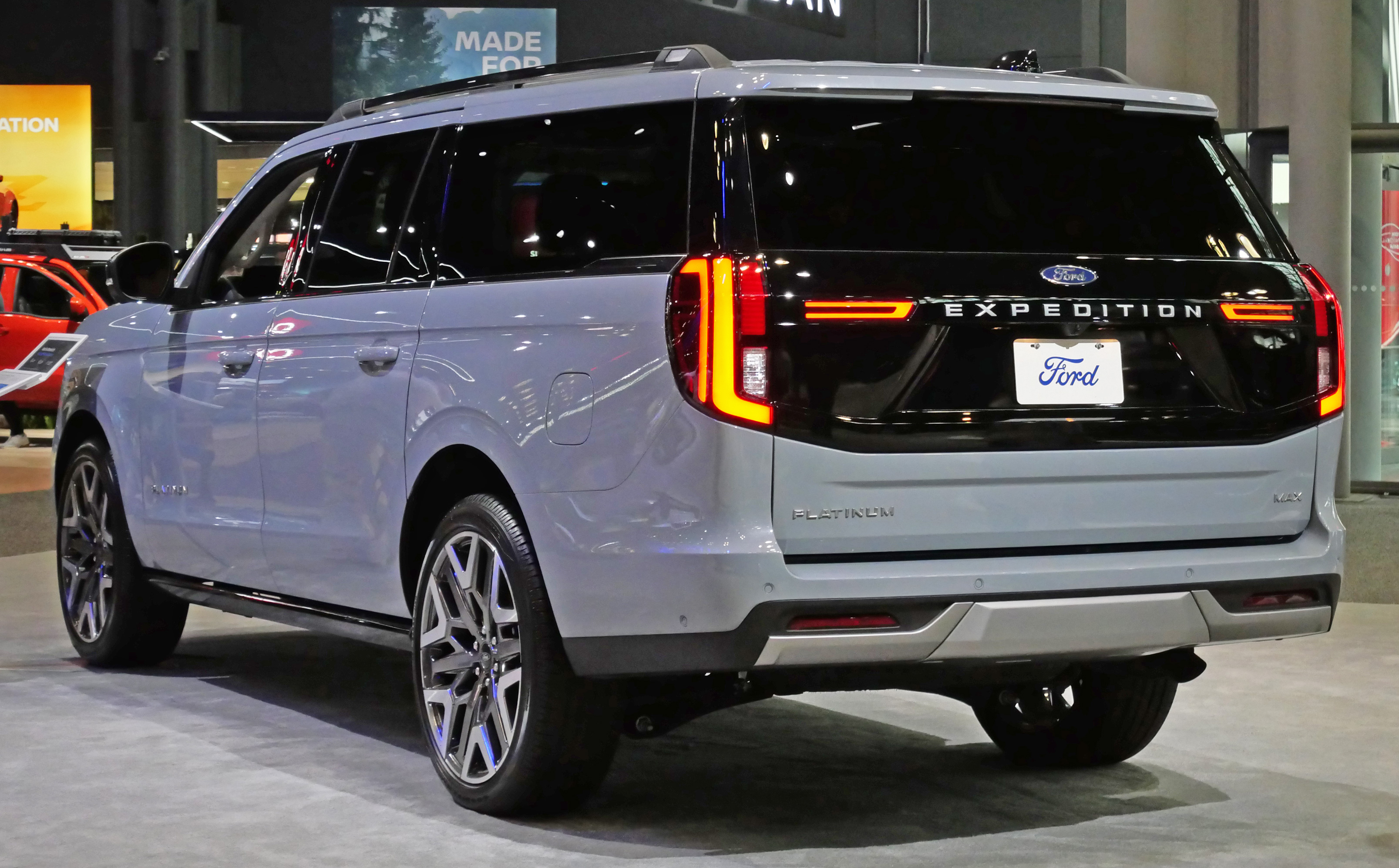
Expedition Platinum MAX (rear)

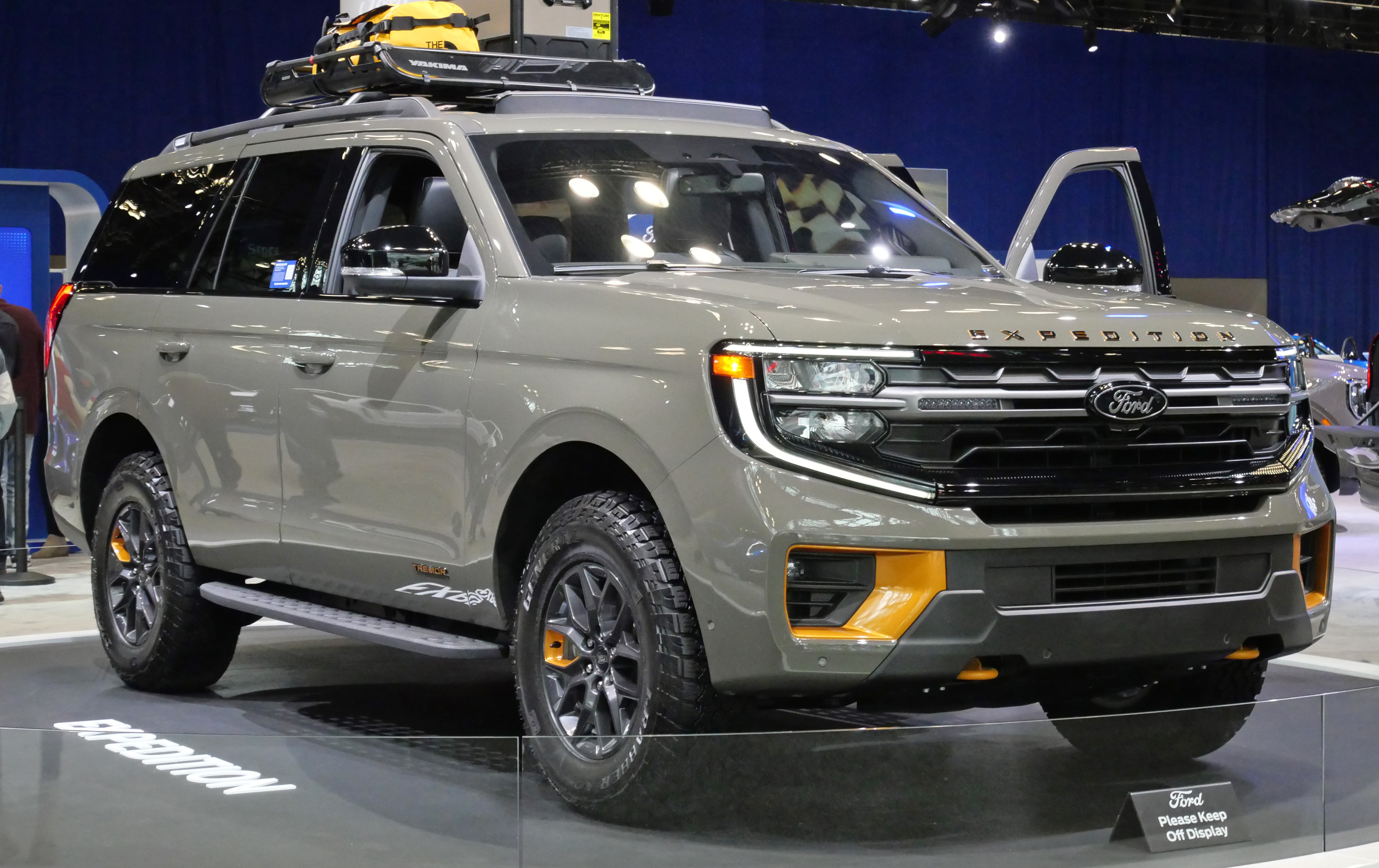
Expedition Tremor

== Expedition EL/Max ==
Expedition EL
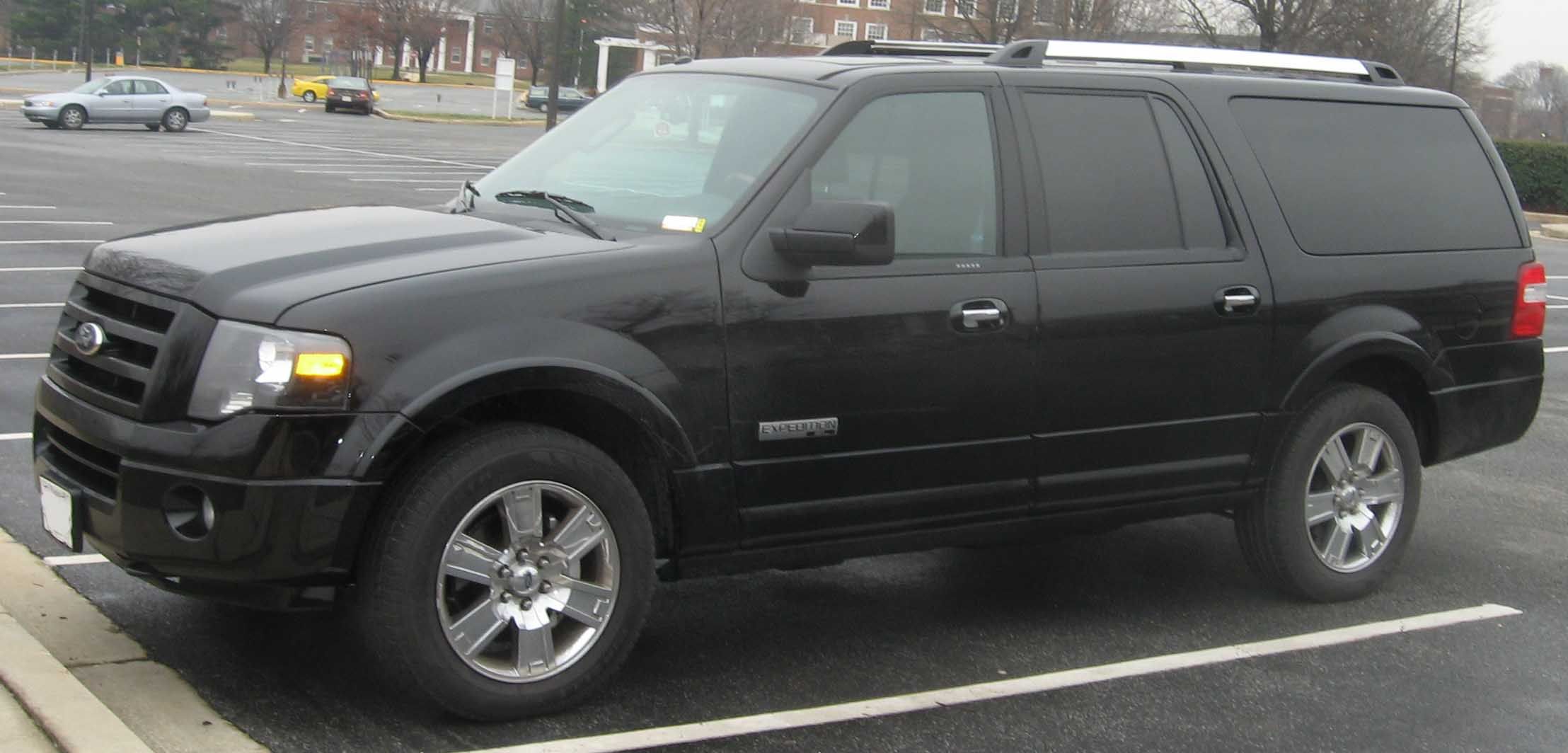

Overview
- Model code: U354
- Also called: Ford Expedition Max (Canada and Mexico only)
- Production: 2006–2017 (EL/Max)
- Model years: 2007–2017
- Assembly: (2006–2009): Wayne, Michigan, United States (2009–2017): Louisville, Kentucky, United States

Body and chassis
- Platform: Ford T1 platform
- Related: Ford Expedition; Lincoln Navigator; Lincoln Navigator L

Powertrain
- Engine: 5.4 L Triton 24V V8 (2007–2014); 3.5 L EcoBoost V6 (2015–2017)
- Transmission: 6-speed 6R75 automatic 6-speed 6R80 automatic 6-speed 6R80 SelectShift automatic Transfer case (4x4 models) 2-speed BorgWarner 4417; High range ratio: 1.00:1; Low range ratio: 2.64:1

Dimensions
- Wheelbase: 131.0 in (3,327 mm)
- Length: 221.3 in (5,621 mm)
- Width: 78.8 in (2,002 mm)
- Height: EL/Max: 77.7 in (1,974 mm); Eddie Bauer (2007–10)/XLT (2011–present): 78.3 in (1,989 mm)

Chronology
- Predecessor: Ford Excursion (indirect)
- Successor: Ford Expedition MAX

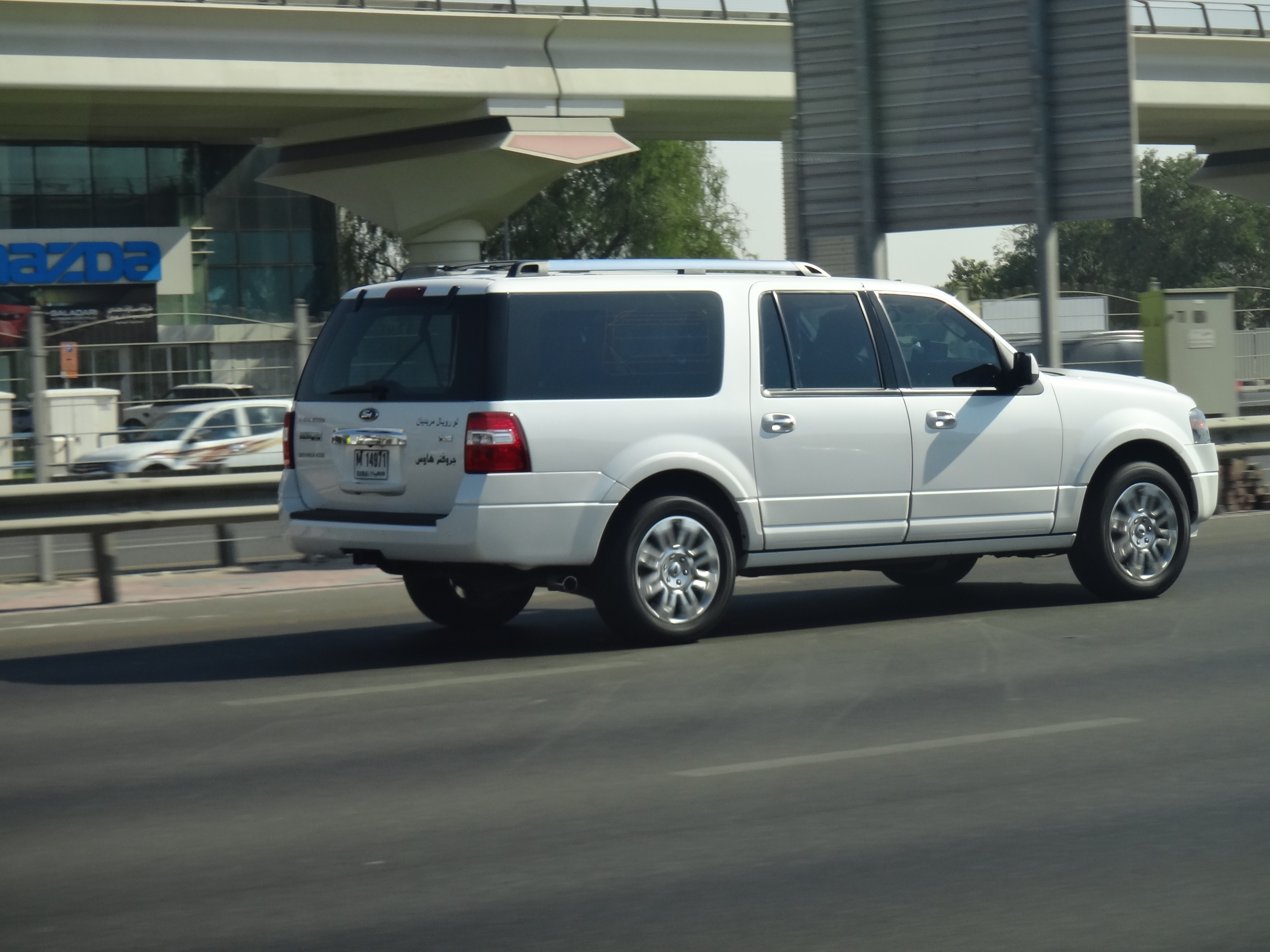
Ford Expedition EL/Max (United Arab Emirates)

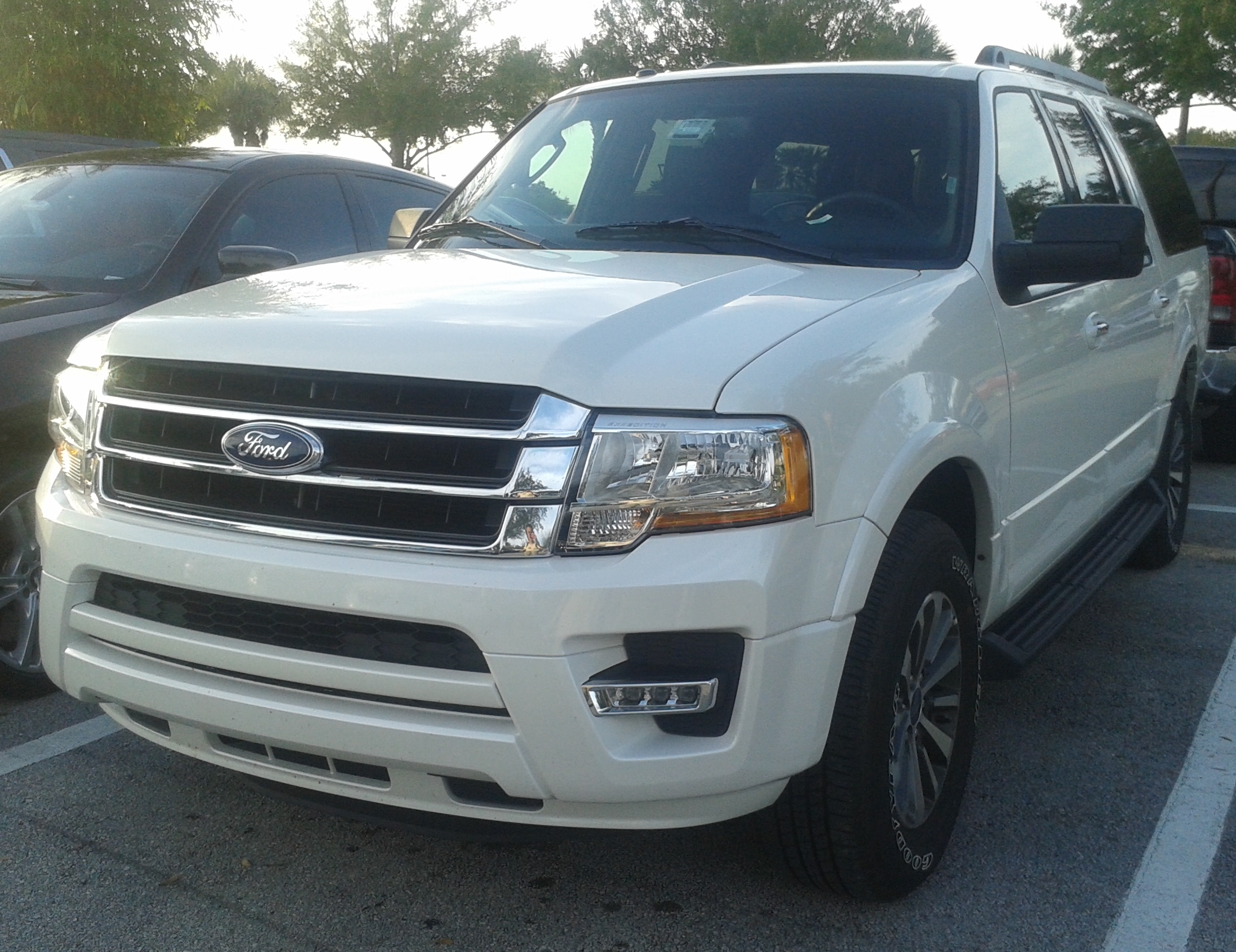
2015 Ford Expedition EL (U354)

As part of the shift to the T1 platform for the 2007 model year, Ford developed an extended-length version of the Expedition, to more closely match the Chevrolet Suburban/GMC Yukon XL in size. Introduced as the Ford Expedition EL (EL=extended length) alongside the Lincoln Navigator L, the variant effectively replaced the Super Duty-based Ford Excursion. In Canada, to avoid confusion with the Acura EL sedan, Ford renamed the extended-length version as the Expedition Max.

Originally intended to carry the Ford Everest name, Ford product planners changed their minds, as the nameplate was already in use for a midsize Ford SUV in Asia. Outside North America, including the U.S. territories of Puerto Rico, U.S. Virgin Islands, and Guam, the Expedition EL is also imported to and sold in the Middle East and Taiwan. In the Philippines, the Expedition EL is the only version imported and sold; coincidentally, it is also a market where the Ford Everest SUV is sold.

=== Expedition EL/Max (2007–2017) ===
For the 2007 model year, Ford introduced the extended-length Expedition EL. With a wheelbase stretched 12 inches (300 mm) (to 131 inches (3,300 mm)) and a length increased 14.8 inches (380 mm) (to 221.3 inches (5,620 mm)) over the standard Expedition, the EL is sized comparably to the Suburban/Yukon XL, providing additional cargo space over the standard-wheelbase version. The extended-length body of the EL is distinguished by its longer cargo-area windows and its rear door design (the rear wheels no longer intrude into the lower half of the doors).

Alongside the standard-length Ford Expedition, the EL was offered with a single powertrain; the 5.4 L Triton V8 was standard from 2007 to 2014, replaced by the twin-turbocharged 3.5 L EcoBoost V6 for 2015 to 2017. The EL is also sold with both rear-wheel and four-wheel-drive configurations. The larger overall size reduced towing capacity by approximately 300 pounds (140 kg), to 8,900 lb (4,000 kg) (for 2WD) and 8,700 lb (3,900 kg) (for 4WD), over a standard-wheelbase example.

Over its first generation, the EL shared its features with the standard-length Expedition; for 2012 model, a cargo organizer became an exclusive feature. The Expedition EL was introduced in four trim lines: XLT, Eddie Bauer, Limited, and the King Ranch series during the 2007–2010 model year. For 2011, the Eddie Bauer trim was replaced by XLT and XLT Premium, with XL becoming the new base trim level. After 2012, all versions of the XL trim were dropped.

For 2015, the EL received the same facelift and upgrades as the standard-length Expedition.

Alongside the standard-length Expedition, the EL also received a 5-star rating from the NHTSA. The Expedition EL was also ranked 9th among the top 15 "Best Family Haulers", according to a June 2009 consumers favorite survey conducted by Edmunds.

=== Expedition Max (2018–2024) ===
Fourth generation
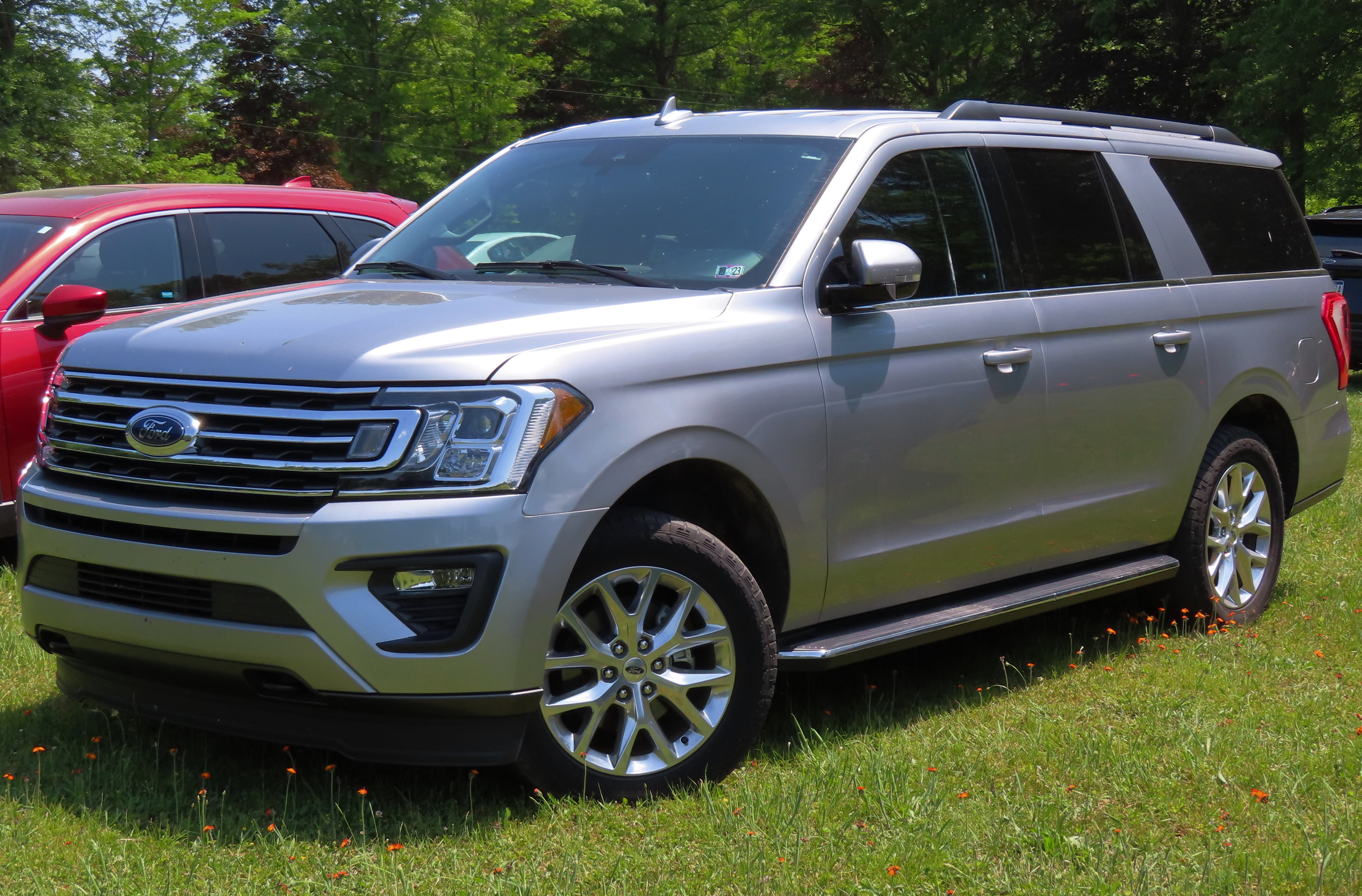

Overview
- Model code: U553
- Production: September 25, 2017 – 2024
- Model years: 2018–2024
- Assembly: Louisville, Kentucky, U.S. (Kentucky Truck Plant) (2017–2024)

Body and chassis
- Platform: Ford T3 platform
- Related: Ford F-150; Lincoln Navigator L

Powertrain
- Engine: 3.5 L EcoBoost V6
- Transmission: 10-speed 10R80 SelectShift automatic Transfer case (4x4 models) 2-speed BorgWarner 4417; High range ratio: 1.00:1; Low range ratio: 2.64:1

Dimensions
- Wheelbase: 131.6 in (3,343 mm)
- Length: 221.9 in (5,636 mm)
- Width: 79.9 in (2,029 mm)
- Height: 76.3 in (1,938 mm)

Chronology
- Predecessor: Ford Expedition EL

For its second generation, the Expedition EL became known as the Expedition Max (now stylized with all capitals as MAX) along with the rest of the world. It debuted in November 2017 for the 2018 model year. Like the standard-length Expedition, this was also unveiled ahead of the Chicago Auto Show and carried the same features and the three featured trims, XLT, Limited, and Platinum. It also expanded its length size by one inch to allow more space and legroom in the third seat row. Although the rear passenger doors were widened, the aft wheel well trim still does not cut into them.

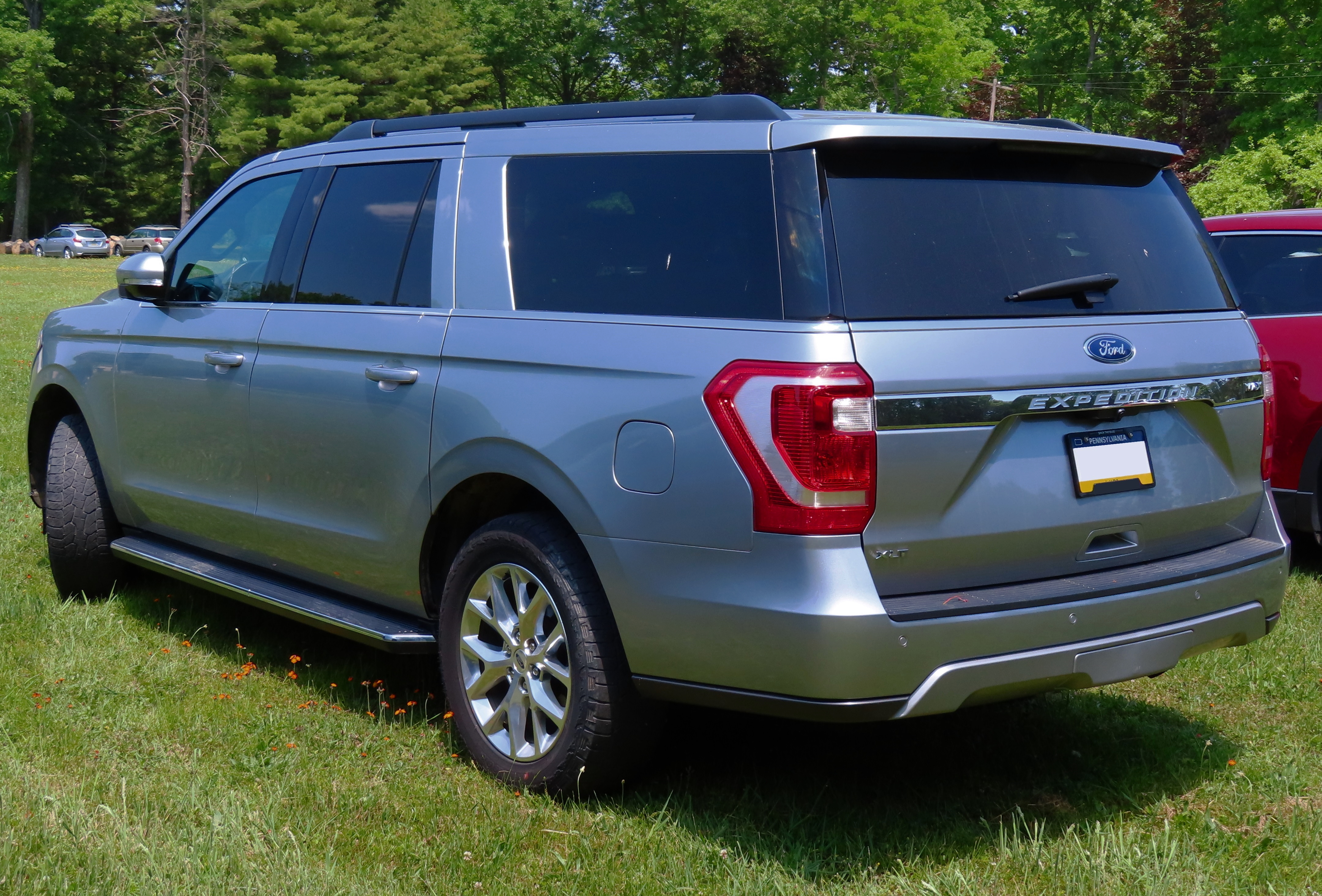
Rear view

This version became more competitive with the Suburban/Yukon XL in the long-wheelbase SUV segment, an area where GM has historically dominated. Like the standard-length Expedition, the Expedition Max also retained its (standard) eight-passenger seating on all trims like before. The Max saw a starting MSRP range of $55,000 (US) for the XLT and $66,800 (US) for the Limited trims, more expensive than the Suburban but on par with the Yukon XL in terms of pricing.

=== Expedition MAX (2025–present) ===
Ford Expedition MAX
- Fifth-generation Ford Expedition MAX

Overview
- Model code: U717
- Production: January 6, 2025 – present
- Model years: 2025–present
- Assembly: Louisville, Kentucky, U.S. (Kentucky Truck Assembly)

Body and chassis
- Platform: Ford T3 platform
- Related: Ford F-150; Lincoln Navigator L

Powertrain
- Engine: 3.5 L EcoBoost twin-turbocharged V6
- Transmission: 10-speed 10R80 SelectShift automatic

Dimensions
- Wheelbase: 131.5 in (3,340 mm)
- Length: 221.7 in (5,631 mm)
- Width: 80.0 in (2,032 mm)
- Height: 78.1 in (1,984 mm)

The third generation MAX is the extended-wheelbase version of the fifth-generation, introduced for the 2025 model year. It features redesigned exterior styling, an updated interior with a panoramic display, and a twin-turbocharged 3.5-liter EcoBoost V6 paired with a ten-speed automatic transmission. The MAX is available in XL SSV (fleet only), Active, Platinum, and King Ranch trims, with rear-wheel drive or four-wheel drive depending on configuration. The MAX provides additional cargo space over the standard-wheelbase Expedition.

== Availability ==
=== Expedition ===
The standard-length Expedition are sold in the United States, Canada, Mexico, the U.S. territories of Puerto Rico, American Samoa, the CNMI, U.S. Virgin Islands, and Guam, Republic of China (Taiwan), the Philippines, the Middle East (excluding Israel), Central America, the Caribbean, South America (except Argentina, Brazil, and Venezuela), Asia (Cambodia, Laos, Mongolia and South Korea), Africa (Algeria, Angola, Cape Verde, Egypt, Gabon, Ghana, Libya, Madagascar, Morocco, Nigeria, and Senegal), and Central Asia (Armenia, Kazakhstan, and Kyrgyzstan).

After the 2015 refresh, the standard-length Expedition became exclusive to the United States, Canada, Mexico, Republic of China (Taiwan), and the Middle East. The US and Canadian Expeditions are available in XLT, Limited, King Ranch and Platinum, while The Mexican Expedition offers the XLT, Limited, and King Ranch trims. The Middle East Expeditions are offered in XL, XLT, Limited, King Ranch, and in Platinum (RWD only) trims.

With the introduction of the fourth-generation Expedition, Ford made the SUV available to North America in the Fall of 2017 first, followed by a global launch in early 2018, where it went on sale in selected countries.

=== Expedition EL/Max ===
For the Expedition EL/Max, all six versions (XL, XLT/Eddie Bauer, XLT Platinum/Sport, Limited, King Ranch and Platinum) are available in the United States. From the 2007 to 2010 model years, The EL/Max level trims were limited to only three versions for Canada, Taiwan, and the Middle East; two for Mexico; and one for the Philippines. Canada's Expedition Max offered the Eddie Bauer, Limited and King Ranch trims, Mexico's Expedition Max in Limited and King Ranch trims, and the Middle East's EL level trims in XLT, Eddie Bauer and Limited. The Philippines' lone Expedition EL level trim was the Eddie Bauer model from 2007 to 2010.

After the 2011 model year Ford made changes in the international exportation of the EL/Max trims. As a result of the changes, the Limited trim became the only version available in Canada and Mexico as Eddie Bauer (in Canada) and King Ranch trims (in both Canada and Mexico) were discontinued, while the Philippines and the Middle East replaced the Eddie Bauer with the XLT trim. The Middle East also started to get all five US-market base trims, including the new XL trims that took the XLT's place and the King Ranch trim.

With the 2015 refresh, the Expedition EL trims for the US market are the same as the standard versions: XLT, Limited, King Ranch, and Platinum, each in 2WD or 4WD. The Canadian Expedition Max is only available in Limited and Platinum level trims, also available in RWD and 4WD. Mexico's Expedition Max are available in rear wheel drive XLT only, but available in RWD and 4WD Limited versions. The Philippines, Taiwan, and Middle East ELs are only available in 4WD Limited trims.

With the introduction of the Expedition Max for the 2018 model year as the successor to the first-generation Expedition EL, Ford made the vehicle available globally, with North America in late 2017 and selected countries in early 2018.

== Four-wheel drive system ==
Selectable automatic full-time Control Trac four-wheel drive designed by BorgWarner is standard on all 4×4 Expeditions. There are four modes: Two High mode, Auto mode, Four High mode and Four Low mode. Each mode can be selected via a rotary control dial on the dash.

The Expedition's system uses a two-speed dual range BorgWarner transfer case with a software controlled variable intelligent locking center multi-disc differential. The four-wheel drive system does not use a planetary or bevel geared center differential, which are typically found in permanent four-wheel-drive systems where torque is supplied to all four wheels.

Selectable Automatic Full-Time ControlTrac Four-Wheel Drive
Mode	Drive type	Operation
Two High (2H)	Rear-wheel drive	The intelligent locking center multi-disc differential is inactive, torque is routed to the rear-wheels only, with high range gearing. Imitates rear-wheel drive and is more economical for on road driving.
Auto (4A)	All-wheel drive (unlocked, variable)	Software does all the work, adjusting the torque split between the front and rear wheels when wheelslip is anticipated or detected. The intelligent locking center multi-disc differential is unlocked and allows for a variable front:rear torque split that ranges from 0:100 to 100:0, or anywhere in-between. Up to 100 percent of torque can be sent to the front wheels, via "torque biasing" for temporary front-wheel drive, in extreme situations where the rear drive axle loses complete traction. High range gearing is used. For use in all-weather on road (dry, wet or slippery pavement) conditions or light off-road conditions.
Four High (4H)	All-wheel drive (locked)	The intelligent locking center multi-disc differential is locked providing a permanently locked 50:50 torque split. The front and rear drive shafts are mechanically locked together forcing them to turn together with absolute zero rotational speed difference. High range gearing is used. Not for use on pavement, only for off-road conditions. If Four High mode is used on pavement, torque windup and drivetrain binding can occur resulting in catastrophic driveline failure.
Four Low (4L)	All-wheel drive (locked)	Similar to Four High mode in operation, the permanently locked 50:50 torque split is maintained; however, low range off-road reduction gearing is engaged. A default off-road program is automatically selected and remaps (reprograms) the electronic throttle control, traction control system (engine control), and turns off AdvanceTrac's electronic stability control and roll stability control safety systems for off-road use. The four-wheel electronic traction control system (brake differential locking control) remains active and continues to function as normal. Not for use on pavement, only for off-road conditions. If Four Low mode is used on pavement, torque windup and drivetrain binding can occur resulting in catastrophic driveline failure.

4WD Expeditions come with standard dual front frame-mounted closed-loop recovery hooks and available off-road underbody protection. Steel plates are placed over vital areas with a composite shield for the fuel tank. Expedition 4x4s are tested alongside the F-150 and Super Duty trucks at Ford's California and Arizona proving grounds. Expedition is put through the same durability tests and evaluations to meet the same durability standards as its pickup truck brethren.

=== Traction control ===
Rear-wheel drive or all-wheel drive have conventional open-type differentials with a choice of axle ratios. Traction control systems, both mechanical and electronic, are optional.

Mechanical traction control (1997–2006)

Both first and second generation Ford Expeditions (UN93 and U222) had an optional Traction-Lok rear limited-slip differential (LSD). The clutch packs inside the LSD tend to be weak, will wear over time, gradually losing their ability to transfer torque, and LSD will function like an open-type differential. The front differential on four-wheel drive models are open-type differential. The AdvanceTrac electronic stability control for the 2003 model year. The Traction-Lok option was dropped after the 2006 model year, but a limited slip differential was reintroduced during the 2015 model year.

Electronic traction control (2003–present)

AdvanceTrac electronic stability control was introduced for the 2003 model year as an optional extra on the second generation Ford Expedition (U222). Bundled with the electronic stability control system is four-wheel electronic traction control (functions at all wheels) for Expeditions with four-wheel drive. Two-wheel drive Expeditions only receive two-wheel electronic traction control for rear wheels. AdvanceTrac was made standard equipment on all third generation Expeditions (U324).

The traction control system uses four-wheel, four-sensor, four-channel anti-lock braking system (ABS) to apply and release the disc brakes on the drive wheel that has lost traction. The ABS clamps down on the slipping drive wheel or wheels, "brake locking" the differential, which can transfer up to 100 percent of supplied torque to the opposing drive wheel with better traction. By ABS "brake locking" both the front and rear differentials, the traction control system can simulate front and rear differential locks. The system works even if two of its drive wheels (one front, one rear) are completely off the ground.

Using the ABS brakes rather than mechanical limited-slip or locking devices inside the axle differentials gives quicker response, more seamless performance, and enhanced durability.

=== Terrain Management System (2018–present) ===
Starting with the 2018 model year, the Expedition and Expedition MAX will utilize Ford's Terrain Management System. Buttons to control the 4x4 system are arranged around the central Terrain Management dial. The system is similar to the one found in the 2011–present Explorer, however the Explorer's system is more simplified. The Expedition's Terrain Management System is adapted from the SVT Raptor to allow use of a 4L (low-lock) mode as well as an electronic locking rear differential. Moreover, the Explorer's Terrain Management System has 4 (four) drive modes, while the Expedition has 7 (seven) drive modes, not including the 3 (three) 4x4 system direct drive modes.

Depending on the mode selected, Terrain Management will control, adjust, and fine tune the engine, transmission, center multi-disc differential lock, throttle response, four-wheel electronic traction control and electronic stability control (ESC) to adapt the SUV for optimal performance on the corresponding terrain.

== Towing capability ==
When first introduced in 1996, the Expedition competed with both the Chevrolet Tahoe and GMC Yukon in the full-size half-ton SUV towing segment. New competitors included the Dodge Durango (which was discontinued in 2009, but reintroduced as a crossover in 2011), Nissan Armada, and Toyota Sequoia. Product research conducted by Ford indicated that 92 percent of Expedition owners use the SUV for vacations. Some 60 percent use it to transport outdoor sports equipment, while 40 percent of Expedition owners use the vehicle for towing. The half-ton Expedition EL/Max competes with the half-ton Chevrolet Suburban 1500 and GMC Yukon XL 1500 in the towing segment.

Since its introduction, the Expedition's braked trailer towing capacity has grown from 8,100 pounds (3,700 kg) to a current rating of 9,200 pounds (4,200 kg) when properly equipped. The list of towing features is also ever growing. Towing features common to all generations of the Expedition include: smallest possible turning radius for increased trailer maneuverability, large side view mirrors to improve rearward visibility, rearward-facing lane departure indicators which are helpful to other motorist when the Expedition is towing a long trailer providing added visual safety, heavy-duty flashers, heavy-duty large disc brakes to withstand prolonged braking while towing, and an available heavy-duty trailer towing package which includes necessary additions for heavy-duty towing.

As of the 2010 model year, the Expedition received trailer sway control (TSC) as standard equipment. TSC detects trailer oscillations and corrects it via asymmetrical ABS braking and reducing engine power until the Expedition and its trailer are both back under control.

=== Heavy-duty trailer towing package ===
Expeditions equipped with the heavy-duty trailer towing package are prepped and readied, at the factory, for towing. The package includes a VESC (Vehicle Equipment Safety Commission) V-5 (or SAE J684) Class IV (Class 4) rated trailer hitch with weight distribution capability, heavy-duty radiator, heavy-duty auxiliary transmission fluid cooler, and hitch mounted 4 and 7-pin trailer electrical connectors.

For model years prior to 2013, these Expeditions are prewired for later installation of an aftermarket electronic trailer brake controller. The brake controller wiring harness is located under the dash on the driver's side. For the 2013 model year onward, these Expeditions are factory equipped with the TowCommand electronic trailer brake controller system. This features +/– gain brake adjustment with support for heavy-duty trailers with up to four axles (quad axle trailers) and is compatible with electrically actuated trailer drum brakes and electric-over-hydraulic (EOH) actuated trailer drum or disc brake systems. The trailer brake controller is fully integrated into the Expedition's four-wheel, four-sensor, four-channel anti-lock braking system (ABS), and trailer sway control (TSC).

Expeditions were offered with an adaptive pneumatic air-ride suspension system with self leveling, payload leveling and trailer load leveling capability from 1997 to 2013. For the 2014 model year, a Nivomat adaptive hydraulic suspension system with self leveling, payload leveling and trailer load leveling replaced the pneumatic system. Both systems can automatically detect when a heavy trailer is coupled, such as a travel trailer, and level the load. Additional ride-height sensors placed on the left and right sides of the SUV also monitor and compensate for any listing caused by improper cargo loading. This keeps the Expedition running straight and level while towing, and at night helps to keep the Expedition's headlamps from blinding oncoming traffic.

== Special Service Vehicle ==
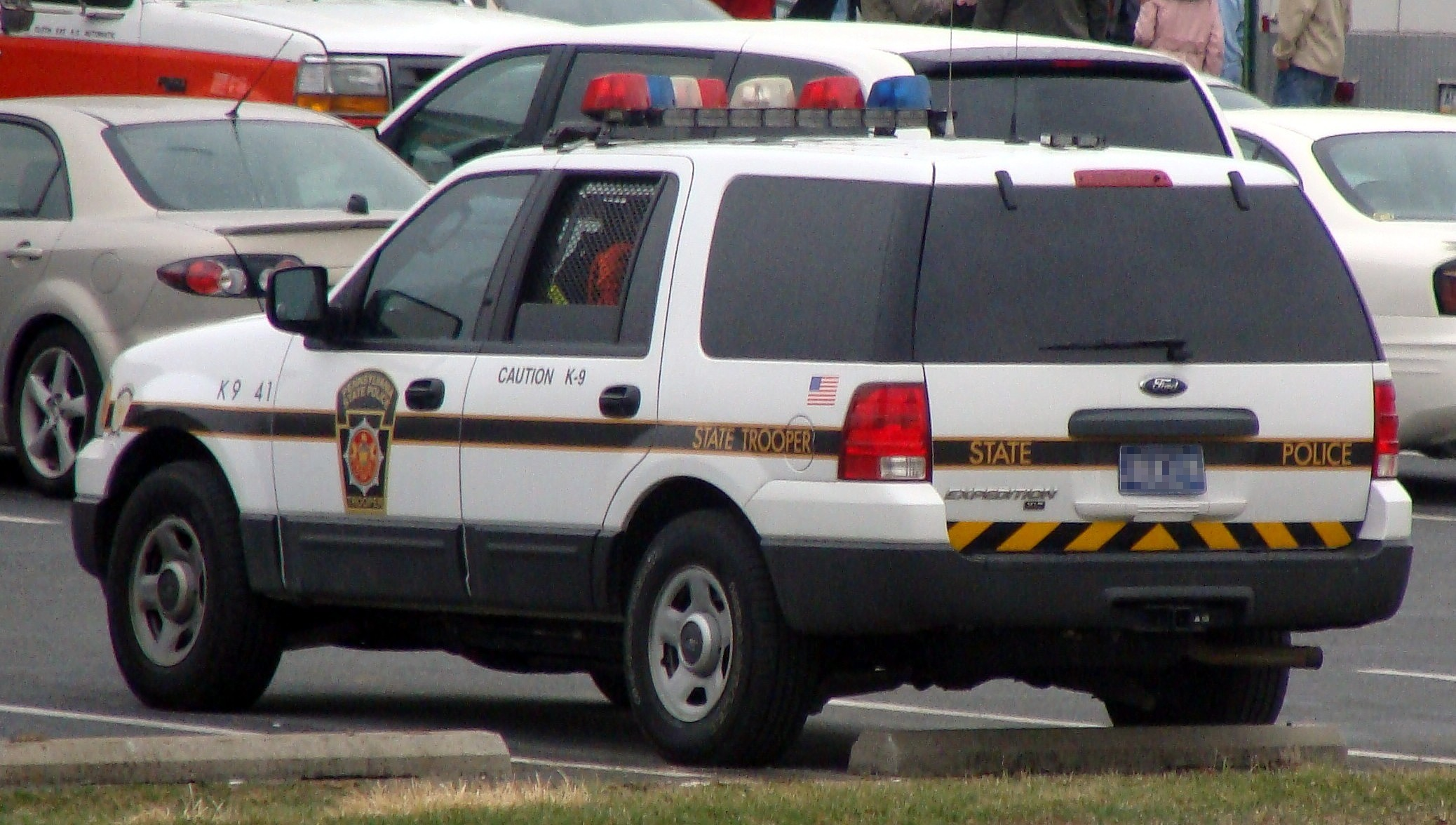
A 2nd-Generation Ford Expedition Special Service

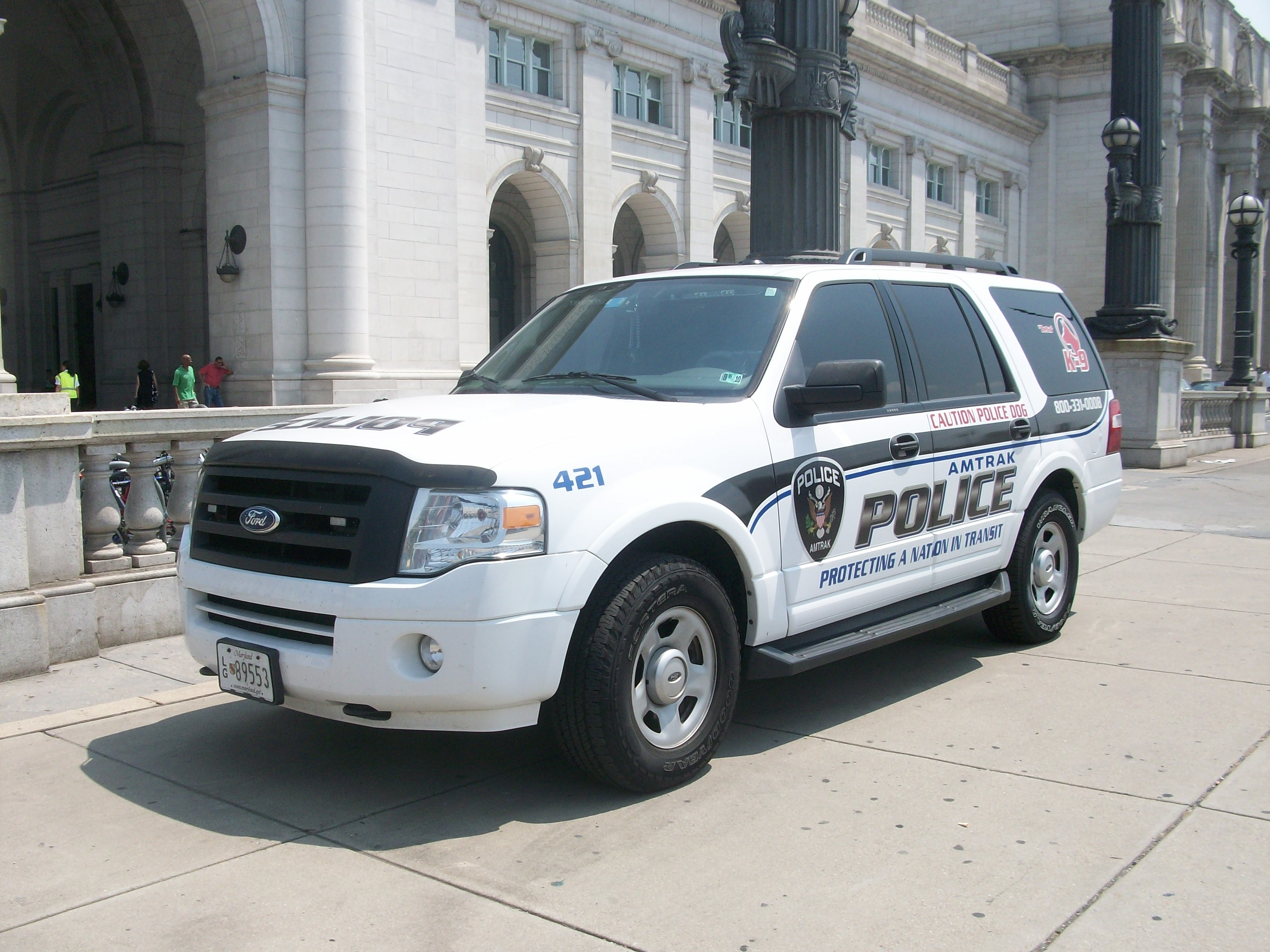
3rd-Generation Ford Expedition Special Service Vehicle Used by the Amtrak Police.

To compete with large police SUVs that are sold by other automobile companies, primarily the Chevrolet Suburban, Ford has made a special version of the Expedition available to law enforcement agencies, fire departments, and EMS agencies. Ford calls it the Expedition Special Service Vehicle (SSV). The primary differences between the standard Expedition and the Special Service Vehicle Expedition are provisions for emergency services related equipment such as radios, lightbars, and sirens.

With the fourth generation Expedition (2018–present) debuting in 2017, Ford announced that the standard size version will be sold to government agencies and law enforcement, available in the lower based XL trim only.

== Funkmaster Flex edition ==
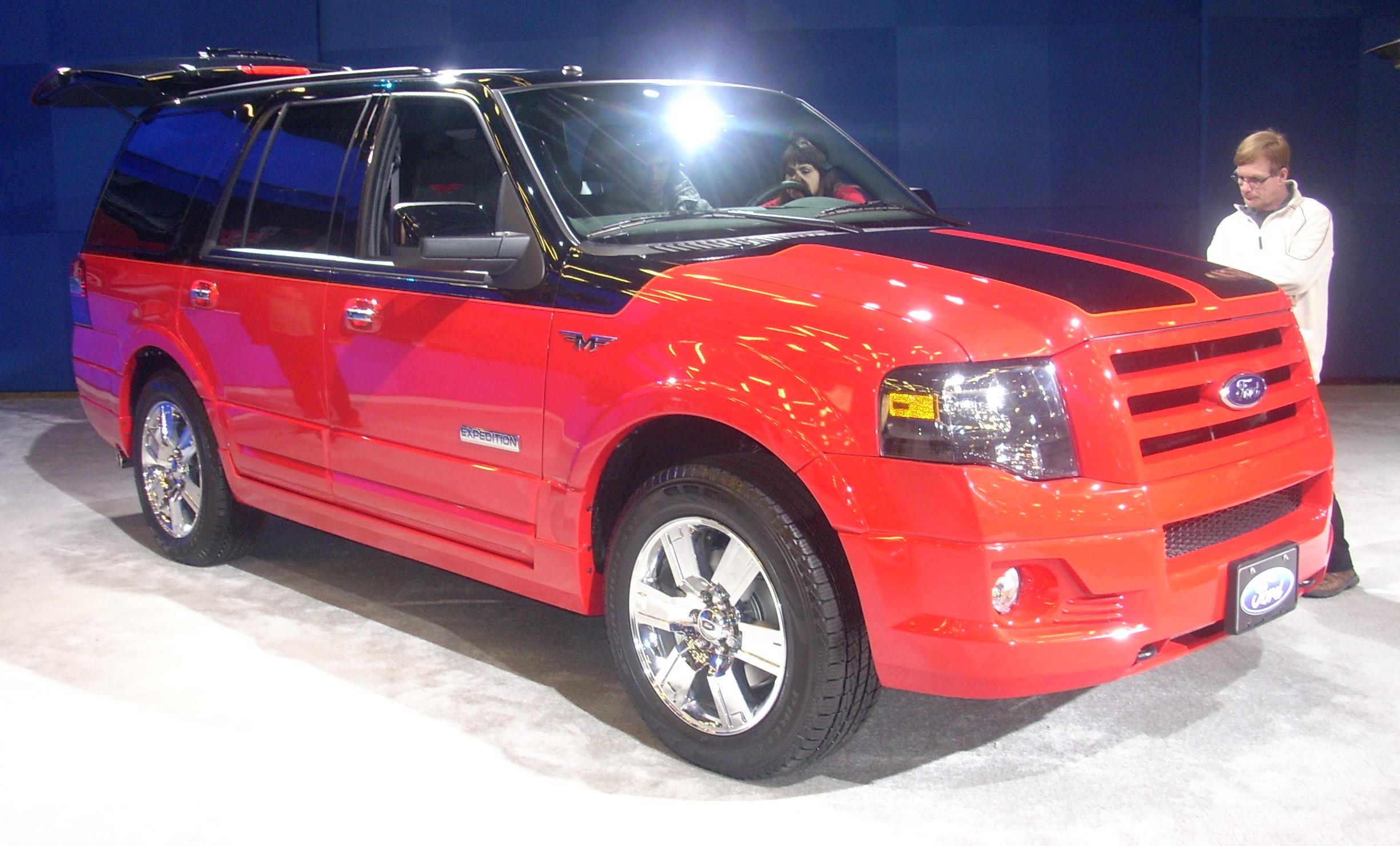
Ford Expedition Funkmaster Flex special edition

2008 was the only year for the Funkmaster Flex special edition Expedition. In 2005, Ford joined forces with rapper and New York City radio personality Funkmaster Flex in a multi-year partnership to create a series of special edition Ford vehicles and advertise the Ford brand. One of those creations was a 2008 Expedition bearing the rapper's name. This limited production SUV featured a special Colorado Red and black two-tone paint job with orange pinstriping, 20 inch chrome wheels, 3D Carbon body kit, Funkmaster Flex badging and a custom black and Colorado Red leather interior on top of Expedition Limited standard equipment. The FMF Expedition went on sale at Ford dealerships in the fall of 2007 and production was limited to 650 units total.

== Reception ==
Motor Trend gave the 2018 Expedition a good review in its February 14, 2018 article, in which they cite the vehicle's "blend of performance (both on- and off-road), comfort, utility, and tech [that] easily make it the new benchmark for the full-size SUV class." However the review notes that there were a few drawbacks in terms of hp acceleration (coming in second to the 2018 Nissan Armada but ahead of the 2018 Chevrolet Tahoe), off-road performance, and its MPG estimate.

The 2018 Expedition also ranked first among large SUVs with a score of 9.3 from U.S. News & World Report.

== Awards ==
The fourth-generation Ford Expedition was nominated at the 2018 North American International Auto Show in the Truck of the Year category, only to lose out to its co-branded cousin Lincoln Navigator. The Expedition was runner-up. Consumer Reports added the short-wheelbase Expedition to its recommended list for 2020, citing improved reliability and owner satisfaction scores.

== Recalls ==
The 2020 Expeditions were recalled in April 2020 over a front passenger safety belt sensor defect, which may malfunction and can lead to a misclassification of the size and weight of the occupant for the restraint system. In some circumstances, this malfunction may not be detected, and the airbag light may not illuminate, leading to injuries if it failed to deploy. The recall affects the 1,368 produced Expeditions (1,355 in the United States, 12 in Canada, and 1 in Mexico) that were built at the Ford Kentucky Truck Plant from November 27 to December 7, 2019.

=== 2026 recall ===
In June 2026 Ford issued a recall order of over 741,000 vehicles, including the Expedition, in the U.S. due to a transmission issue that may damage the park system.

== Yearly sales ==
Calendar year	United States	Canada	Mexico
1996	45,974		
1997	214,524		
1998	225,703		
1999	233,125		
2000	213,483		
2001	178,045		
2002	163,454		
2003	181,547		
2004	159,846		
2005	114,137	2,413	3,611
2006	87,203	2,528	3,957
2007	90,287	2,217	3,535
2008	55,123	1,557	3,135
2009	31,655	1,584	2,112
2010	37,336	1,664	1,653
2011	40,499	1,677	1,109
2012	38,062	1,872	729
2013	38,350	1,638	482
2014	44,632	1,659	536
2015	41,443	2,282	533
2016	59,835	3,729	711
2017	51,883	3,204	750
2018	54,661	2,798	957
2019	86,422	4,381	944
2020	77,838	3,466	484
2021	81,988	4,876	462
2022	62,007		751
2023	73,396		741
2024	78,035		546
2025	85,921		
