= Ford Team RS =

European racing division of Ford Motor Company

Ford TeamRS
- Type: Car tuning
- Industry: Motorsport; Automotive engineering
- Predecessor: Ford Special Vehicle Engineering
- Founded: Boreham, Essex, England (1963)
- Founder: Ford Motor Company
- Defunct: 2015
- Fate: Merged with other performance divisions to form Ford Performance
- Successor: Ford Performance
- Headquarters: Dunton, England
- Area served: United Kingdom
- Key people: David PericakGlobal Director Ford Performance; Jamal Hameedi Chief Program Engineer Global Performance Vehicles; Kerry Baldori Chief Functional Engineer Global Performance Vehicles
- Products: Racing cars Performance cars
- Parent: Ford Motor Company
- Divisions: Ford Racing
- Subsidiaries: Ford's Performance Vehicles; Ford's Team RS
- Website: fordracing.com

The Ford TeamRS was Ford Motor Company's European performance car and motorsport division for Ford Racing activity. The Ford RS badge was born for rally racing, the RS stands for Rallye Sport. TeamRS was the successor to Ford Special Vehicle Engineering.

TeamRS has been superseded by a global organisation called Ford Performance. They are responsible for the conversion of the 2006 Ford GT from US-Spec to Euro-Spec.

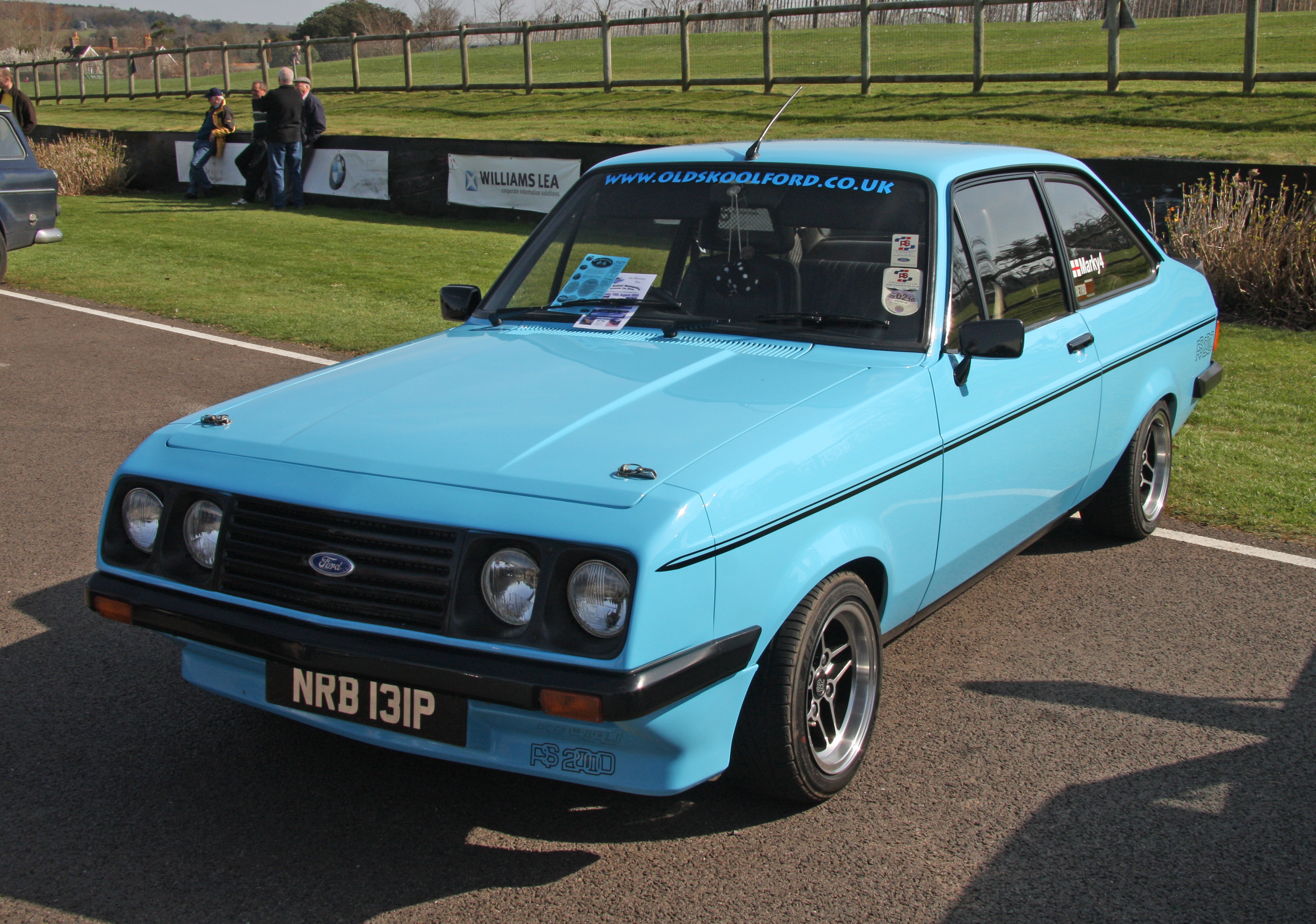
1976 Ford Escort RS2000 Mk II

== History ==
=== Ford RS models ===
- 1969 - Ford 17m RS, Ford 20m RS, Ford 15m RS
- 1970 - Ford Escort RS1600, Ford Capri RS2600
- 1973 - Ford Escort RS2000, Ford Capri RS3100
- 1975 - Ford Escort RS1800
- 1976 - Ford Escort RS Mexico, Ford Escort RS2000 Mk II
- 1981 - Ford Escort RS1600i
- 1984 - Ford Escort RS Turbo, Ford RS200
- 1985 - Ford Sierra RS Cosworth
- 1987 - Ford Sierra RS500 Cosworth
- 1988 - Ford Sierra Cosworth
- 1990 - Ford Sierra Cosworth 4x4. Ford Fiesta RS Turbo
- 1991 - Ford Escort RS2000
- 1992 - Ford Escort RS Cosworth, Ford Fiesta RS1800
- 1994 - Ford Escort RS2000 4x4
- 2002 - Ford Focus RS
- 2003 - Ford Tierra RS/Ford Laser Lynx RS
- 2009 - Ford Focus RS Mk II
- 2010 - Ford Focus RS500
- 2015 - Ford Focus RS Mk III

=== Ford ST models ===
- 1997 - Ford Mondeo ST24
- 2000 - Ford Mondeo ST200
- 2002 - Ford Focus ST170, Ford Mondeo ST220
- 2004 - Ford Fiesta ST
- 2005 - Ford Focus ST
- 2012 - Ford Focus ST
- 2018 - Ford Focus ST
- 2013 - Ford Fiesta ST
- 2018 - Ford Fiesta ST
- 2019 - Ford Edge ST
- 2020 - Ford Explorer ST

== See also ==
- Ford Racing
- Special Vehicle Team (SVT), North America's performance car division
- Ford Performance Vehicles (FPV), Australia's performance car division
- Ford Special Vehicle Operations (SVO)
- Ford World Rally Team
- The Professionals (TV series)
