= Special Vehicle Team =

High-performance division of the Ford Motor Company

Special Vehicle Team (SVT)
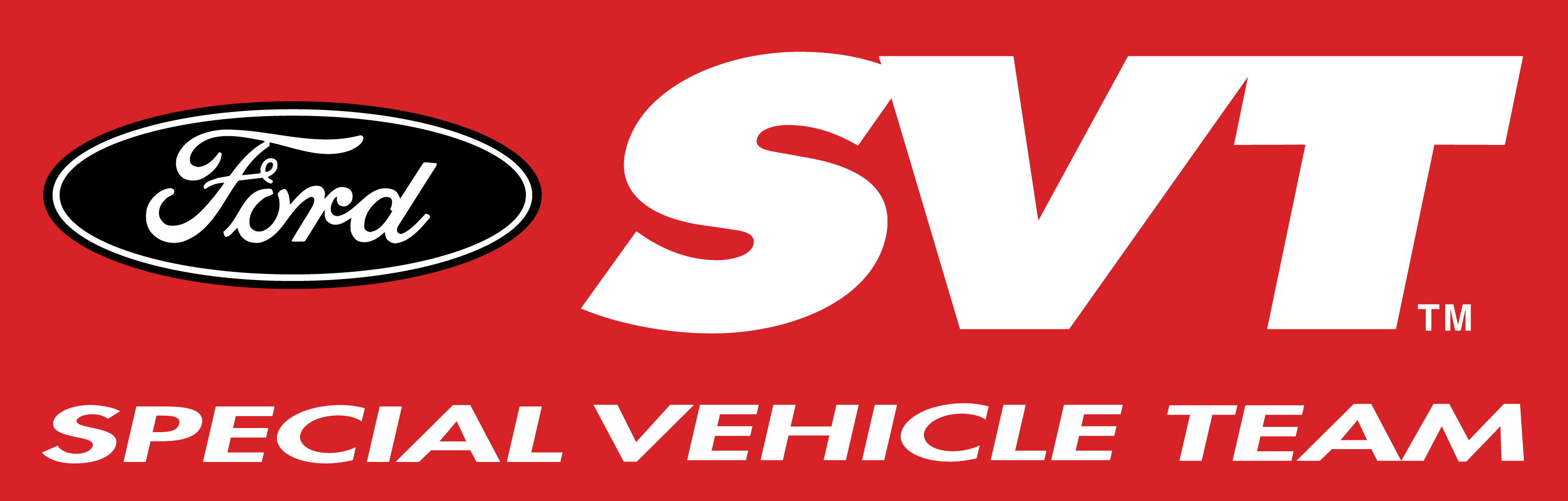
- Type: Subsidiary
- Predecessor: Special Vehicle Operations
- Founded: 1991
- Defunct: 2015; 11 years ago
- Fate: Merged to form Ford Performance
- Successor: Ford Performance
- Headquarters: U.S.
- Products: High-performance cars
- Parent: Ford Motor Company

Special Vehicle Team, also known as SVT, was an arm of Ford Motor Company responsible for the development of the company's highest-performance vehicles. Established in 1991, SVT was the successor to the SVO division. The last SVT Director was Hermann Salenbauch. SVT was previously led by Hau Thai-Tang (2004–2007) and John Coletti (1993-2004). In 2015, Ford Racing, alongside Ford Team RS and Special Vehicle Team, merged into a global entity named Ford Performance.

== Information ==
The group mainly produces specially tuned versions of Ford production vehicles such as the 2010 F-150 SVT Raptor which is based on the Ford F150. However, they do occasionally develop models independently of the rest of the company, namely the GT supercar (developed in conjunction with Saleen). SVT was founded in 1983 by John Plant of Ford Marketing, Janine Bay of Ford Mustang Program Management, and Robert Burnham of Ford Truck Program Management. Originally known as Special Vehicle Operations, SVO developed the 1984–1986 2.3-liter turbo-charged 4-cylinder Mustang SVO, as well as marketed performance parts through dealer networks (now known as Ford Performance Parts, or FPP).

Ford SVT debuted the 2010 F-150 SVT Raptor high-performance off-road truck. Using a completely re-designed suspension, with internal-bypass Fox Racing Shocks and specially developed BF Goodrich all-terrain 35" tires, the Raptor is considered an OEM-style "pre-runner." Pre-runners are reconnaissance vehicles used for high-speed testing of off-road race courses before a race.

F-150 SVT Raptor also debuted the all-new 6.2-liter V8 engine as an option for the 2010 model year (likely to be standard in subsequent model years). Ford reports horsepower and torque as 411 hp (306 kW) @ 5500 rpm, 434 lb·ft (588 N·m) @ 4500 rpm in the Raptor. All Raptor models will have a 6-speed automatic transmission, selectable 4WD, and rear E-Locker that stays engaged at high-speeds.

In 2015 as a result of Ford's plan to globalize their vehicles, SVT and the European RS division merged, forming Ford Performance and thus aligning all American and European performance vehicle activity together.

== SVT vehicles ==
Model	Version		Year	Engine	Power	Torque	Production
SVT Lightning	9		1993	5.8 L Windsor FI V8	240 hp (179 kW)	340 ft·lbf (461 N·m)	5,276
SVT Lightning	9		1994	5.8 L Windsor FI V8	240 hp (179 kW)	340 ft·lbf (461 N·m)	4,007
SVT Lightning	9		1995	5.8 L Windsor FI V8	240 hp (179 kW)	340 ft·lbf (461 N·m)	2,280
SVT Lightning	9		Total				11,563
SVT Lightning	10		1999	5.4 L supercharged Triton V8	360 hp (268 kW)	440 ft·lbf (597 N·m)	4,000
SVT Lightning	10		2000	5.4 L supercharged Triton V8	360 hp (268 kW)	440 ft·lbf (597 N·m)	4,966
SVT Lightning	10		2001	5.4 L supercharged Triton V8	380 hp (283 kW)	450 ft·lbf (610 N·m)	6,381
SVT Lightning	10		2002	5.4 L supercharged Triton V8	380 hp (283 kW)	450 ft·lbf (610 N·m)	4,726
SVT Lightning	10		2003	5.4 L supercharged Triton V8	380 hp (283 kW)	450 ft·lbf (610 N·m)	4,270
SVT Lightning	10		2004	5.4 L supercharged Triton V8	380 hp (283 kW)	450 ft·lbf (610 N·m)	3,781
SVT Lightning	10		Total				28,124
SVT Lightning	Total - SVT Lightning						39,687
SVT Cobra	Fox	Base	1993	5.0 L Windsor V8	235 hp (175 kW)	280 ft·lbf (380 N·m)	4,993
SVT Cobra	Fox	R	1993	5.0 L Windsor V8	235 hp (175 kW)	280 ft·lbf (380 N·m)	107
SVT Cobra	Fox	Total					5,100
SVT Cobra	SN-95 1 / Fox-4	Base	1994	5.0 L Windsor V8	240 hp (179 kW)	285 ft·lbf (386 N·m)	6,009
SVT Cobra	SN-95 1 / Fox-4	Base	1995	5.0 L Windsor V8	240 hp (179 kW)	285 ft·lbf (386 N·m)	5,008
SVT Cobra	SN-95 1 / Fox-4	Base	1996	4.6 L DOHC Modular V8	305 hp (227 kW)	300 ft·lbf (407 N·m)	10,002
SVT Cobra	SN-95 1 / Fox-4	Base	1997	4.6 L DOHC Modular V8	305 hp (227 kW)	300 ft·lbf (407 N·m)	10,049
SVT Cobra	SN-95 1 / Fox-4	Base	1998	4.6 L DOHC Modular V8	305 hp (227 kW)	300 ft·lbf (407 N·m)	8,654
SVT Cobra	SN-95 1 / Fox-4	R	1995	5.8 L Windsor V8	300 hp (224 kW)	365 ft·lbf (495 N·m)	250
SVT Cobra	SN-95 1 / Fox-4	Total					39,973
SVT Cobra	SN-95 2	Base	1999	4.6 L DOHC Modular V8	320 hp (239 kW)	317 ft·lbf (430 N·m)	8,095
SVT Cobra	SN-95 2	Base	2001	4.6 L DOHC Modular V8	320 hp (239 kW)	317 ft·lbf (430 N·m)	7,251
SVT Cobra	SN-95 2	Base	2003	4.6 L DOHC SC Modular V8	390 hp (291 kW)	390 ft·lbf (529 N·m)	13,476
SVT Cobra	SN-95 2	Base	2004	4.6 L DOHC SC Modular V8	390 hp (291 kW)	390 ft·lbf (529 N·m)	5,664
SVT Cobra	SN-95 2	R	2000	5.4 L DOHC Modular V8	385 hp (287 kW)	385 ft·lbf (522 N·m)	300
SVT Cobra	SN-95 2	Total					34,859
SVT Cobra	Total - SVT Cobra						79,932
SVT Contour	CDW27		1998	2.5 L Duratec 25 SVT V6	195 hp (145 kW)	165 ft·lbf (224 N·m)	6,535
SVT Contour	CDW27		1999	2.5 L Duratec 25 SVT V6	200 hp (149 kW)	169 ft·lbf (229 N·m)	2,760
SVT Contour	CDW27		2000	2.5 L Duratec 25 SVT V6	200 hp (149 kW)	169 ft·lbf (229 N·m)	2,150
SVT Contour	Total						11,445
SVT Focus	CW170		2002	2.0 L Zetec I4	170 hp (127 kW)	145 ft·lbf (197 N·m)	4,788
SVT Focus	CW170		2003	2.0 L Zetec I4	170 hp (127 kW)	145 ft·lbf (197 N·m)	6,158
SVT Focus	CW170		2004	2.0 L Zetec I4	170 hp (127 kW)	145 ft·lbf (197 N·m)	3,057
SVT Focus	Total						14,003
Total							144,993*

SVT is credited in the following vehicles:

- 1993 SVT Cobra
- 1993 SVT Cobra R
- 1993-1995 Ford SVT Lightning
- 1994-1995 SVT Cobra
- 1995 SVT Cobra R
- 1995 Ford Thunderbird SVT (Concept car)
- 1995 Ford GT90
- 1996-1998 SVT Cobra
- 1998-2000 SVT Contour
- 1999-2001 SVT Cobra
- 2000 SVT Cobra R
- 1999-2004 Ford SVT Lightning
- 2000 Ford SVT Thunder (unreleased car based on the 2000 Ford Expedition)
- 2003-2004 SVT Cobra
- 2002-2004 SVT Focus
- 2005–2006 Ford GT
- 2007-2009 SVT/Shelby GT500
- 2010–2014 Ford F-150 SVT Raptor, (the 2015-present Raptor loses the SVT prefix)
- 2010-2014 SVT/Shelby GT500

== See also ==
- Ford TeamRS, Ford's European performance car and motorsport division
- Ford Performance Vehicles (FPV), Ford Australia's performance car division
