= Special Vehicle Operations =

High-performance division of the Ford Motor Company

Special Vehicle Operations (SVO) is a term used throughout Ford Motor Company's global operations as a performance group, first used in America as Ford's own "speed shop", with a separate budget from Ford's regular operations. In 1993, the group was renamed Special Vehicle Team (SVT).

== SVO America ==
In 1981, Ford formed the SVO group to design and develop performance parts and accessories related to the company's racing programs. SVO was involved motorsports programs, expanding Ford racing, establishing a performance parts business, and producing road cars.

=== Racing ===
SVO turned its attention to building Mustangs for the Sports Car Club of America (SCCA) Trans-Am and International Motor Sports Association (IMSA) GT series. With engine builder Jack Roush now involved the factory-backed SVO Mustangs dominated Trans-Am, winning 17 of 34 contests in 1985-86, and by '89, Ford had scored 46 Trans-Am victories, more than all other manufacturers combined. SVO also helped end 9 years of Chevrolet NASCAR dominance, with Ford drivers finishing 1-2-3 in NASCAR's final Winston Cup standings.

=== Mustang SVO ===
The group's sole production car, the Ford Mustang SVO, was designed to compete directly with European sports sedans like BMW's 3 Series. To reduce costs, they used the existing 2.3 L turbocharged four-cylinder engine and Borg-Warner T-5 five-speed manual transmission from the Ford Thunderbird Turbo Coupe. The car had a different computer and air meter and added an intercooler, a Hurst shifter, KONI Group shock absorbers, and 16 inch wheels, a novelty at the time. The car produced 175 hp (130 kW) for the 1984 model year (MY) and the first part of the 1985 MY, 205 hp (152 kW) after mid-1985 MY, and 200 hp (149 kW) for the 1986 model year. In total, 9,844 were built.

== SVO Australia ==
SVO (Special Vehicle Operations) name was used in the 1990s by Southside Ford in Brisbane which was the only Ford Motorsport parts importer of the time. They released a limited run of EL Falcons to showcase what could be done with Ford Motorsport Parts. (Special Vehicle Options) Was established in Australia by Australian motor racing driver and engineer Mick Webb in the late 1980s. Dick Johnson had also used the SVO nameplate, originally on a prototype Turbo XF Falcon. Webb and Johnson both claimed ownership of the acronym, however it was Webb whom first registered its usage. Mick Webb’s SVO are still enhancing and modifying Ford products today. He owns and operates a factory in Ringwood, Victoria.

=== Mick Webb's SVO ===
==== EA Falcon SVO ====
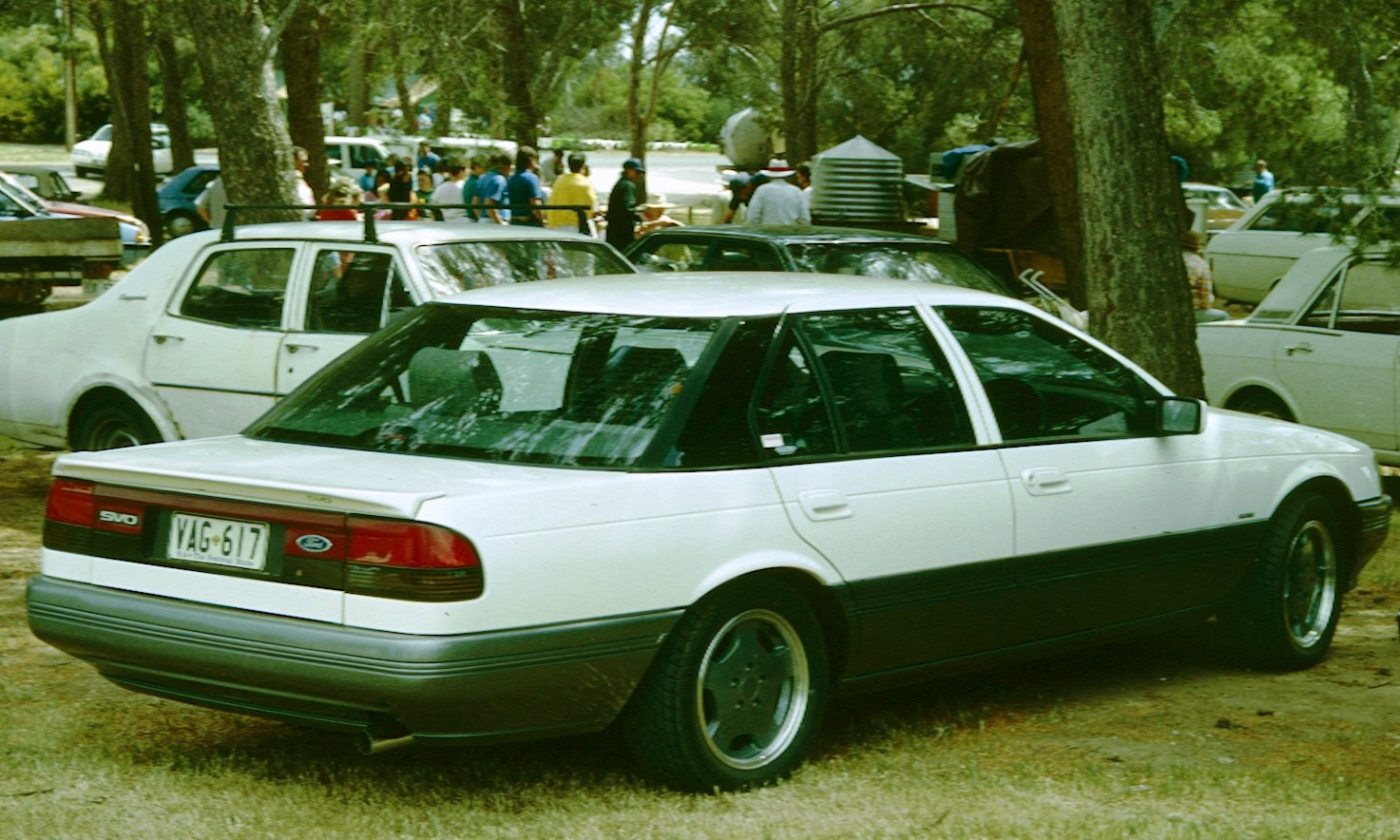
Ford Falcon (EA) SVO

SVO first road car was based the then new Ford Falcon EA, starting with a "S Pac" or "Fairmont Ghia" trim levels. SVO added customised ROH 16" wheels, Recaro seats, MOMO steering wheels, suspension upgrades including Bilstein shock absorbers, engine modifications, spoilers and two tone grey paint work. SVO had hoped that these cars would lead to a relationship with Ford Australia as a factory backed performance arm, however, at this point Ford were not investing in performance or racing. The relationship didn't evolve any further, but selected Ford dealers sold the SVO product.

SVO originally produced 600 Falcon Sedans, 100 Utes, 600 Fairlanes and 280 Capris.

==== Other Models ====
Melbourne and Sydney dealership records indicate that 5 SVO Fairlane NL models were produced between 1997 - 1998. Several Falcon (EL) XR8 and Fairmont (EL) Ghia's were also produced by Southside Ford in Brisbane to showcase what imported Ford Motorsport parts branch in the U.S could be used to improve the Falcon. These were reviewed in Motor and Wheels magazines in 1997 and available in either a 195kW or a 215kW. The AU Falcon was also available with SVO enhancements, including a 185 kW 6-cylinder engine.

==== Motorsport ====
SVO was successful in building (and racing) Falcons in the AUSCAR category.

== See also ==
- Ford Performance Vehicles
- Tickford Vehicle Engineering
