= Ford C6 transmission =

Transmission

C-6 "Selectshift Cruise-O-Matic"

Overview
- Manufacturer: Ford Motor Company
- Production: 1966–2004

Body and chassis
- Class: 3-speed longitudinal automatic transmission
- Related: Ford C4

Chronology
- Predecessor: Ford MX
- Successor: Ford TorqShift

The Ford C6 is a heavy-duty automatic transmission built by Ford Motor Company between 1966 and 2004. It was marketed as the "SelectShift Cruise-O-Matic." Compared to its predecessor MX transmission, the C6 offered lower weight, less complexity, less parasitic power loss, and greater torque capacity for larger engines. It did this without exceeding the packaging dimensions of the MX. These design goals were in line with those of the C4 for smaller engines. It was given the name "SelectShift" because if the transmission were placed in first or second gear, the transmission would use only the gear selected (i.e. would immediately activate that gear rather than initiating a sequence of shifts to arrive at it), whether from a standing stop or in motion. This was very helpful when driving in limited-traction situations, where the torque of the engine would gradually move the vehicle, or if engine braking were needed on a downward incline. Once the transmission was placed in third, all three gears would be used in a normal fashion.

== Design ==
To cut down on weight and cost, the C6 featured a simple, three-speed Simpson planetary gearset. To aid in shift quality and long-term durability, it was the first automatic transmission designed to use the Borg-Warner flexible shift band. It had disc clutch plates instead of bands on the low and reverse gears. It got new composite plates and valving. This gave it the capability to handle up to 475 ft-lb of torque.

The C6 was used in trucks and cars with larger engines. Five different bell-housing varieties exist for use with various Ford engine families:

- The Windsor pattern was used on the 300 I6, the Ford Windsor engines, and the 351 Cleveland.
- The 460 pattern was used on the 351M and 400 and all of the Ford "385" engines.
- The FE pattern was used on the FE engines.
- The rare 1966–68 Lincoln MEL 462 pattern was used on 1966–68 Lincoln Continentals with the 462 engine, and also on 1968–69 Lincoln Continentals with the 460. This pattern rounds off on the passenger side to clear the heat/AC box on the 1966–69 Lincoln firewall.
- The diesel pattern was similar to the 351M/400M/"385" pattern, but they are not interchangeable.

The Ford C6 transmission remains a dominant force in drag racing today, especially when equipped with manual valve bodies, transbrakes, and some units using air-shifting technology. Its robust reputation makes it a favorite in off-road applications, known for its near-indestructible nature. However, its drawback lies in its significant power consumption, impacting both performance and fuel efficiency. Despite this, it remains reliable, easily maintained, and among the most user-friendly transmissions available. Rebuilding it is also straightforward and cost-effective. Commonly found until 1989, transmissions used in 1990–1996 models were primarily an option for fleet vehicles such as F-Series trucks and Econoline vans.

Applications:

- 1978–1991 Ford Bronco
- 1967–1996 Ford F-Series
- 1964–1970 Ford Fairlane
- 1966–1974 Ford Galaxie
- 1966–1980 Ford LTD
- 1977–1979 Ford LTD II
- 1966–1979 Ford Ranchero
- 1966–1979 Ford Thunderbird
- 1968–1976 Ford Torino
- 1966–1979 Lincolns
- 1966–1969 Mercury Comet
- 1967–1973 Ford Mustang
- 1967–1978 Mercury Cougar
- 1966–1972 Mercury Meteor
- 1968–1976 Mercury Montego
- 1968–1974 Mercury Monterey
- 1975–1996 Ford Econoline
- 1972–1989 De Tomaso Longchamp

== E4OD ==
Ford used the C6 transmission's core components to develop its first electronically controlled automatic transmission, the E4OD, unveiled in 1989. Applied across light- and heavy-duty uses, this system boasted four forward speeds and substituted the C6's hydraulic governor control with electronic shift controls. The valve body underwent a complete overhaul from its C6 predecessor. Moreover, the E4OD incorporated an extra planetary gear set to introduce a fourth gear, accompanied by the integration of a lockup clutch within the torque converter.

Applications:

- 1990–1996 Ford Bronco
- 1989–1998 Ford Econoline
- 1997–1998 Ford Expedition
- 1989–1997 Ford F-Series (including 1993–1995 SVT Lightning) (used in 1988 in the F53 motor home chassis)

== 4R100 ==
The E4OD was updated in 1998, and this new transmission was the last iteration of the C6. It was largely the same as the E4OD, but with some changes to internal components to withstand the stress from increasingly powerful versions of the Power Stroke diesel engine. For 1999, it was fitted with a PTO for auxiliary equipment attached to heavy-duty trucks. To follow Ford's new naming schemes for its other transmissions, Ford renamed the E4OD the 4R100.

Applications:

- 1999–2004 Ford F-150 SVT Lightning
- 2002–2003 Ford F-150 Harley-Davidson Edition
- 1997–2003 Ford F-150 7700 (low-emissions vehicles only)
- 1999–2003 Ford Super Duty
- 1999–2003 Ford Expedition (with 5.4 L V8)
- 2000–2003 Ford Excursion
- 1997–2004 Ford Econoline/E-Series
- 2002 Lincoln Blackwood
- 1998–2004 Lincoln Navigator

== See also ==
- List of Ford transmissions
