= Ford F-Series (eleventh generation) =

Eleventh generation of the Ford F-Series pickup trucks

Eleventh generation (P221)
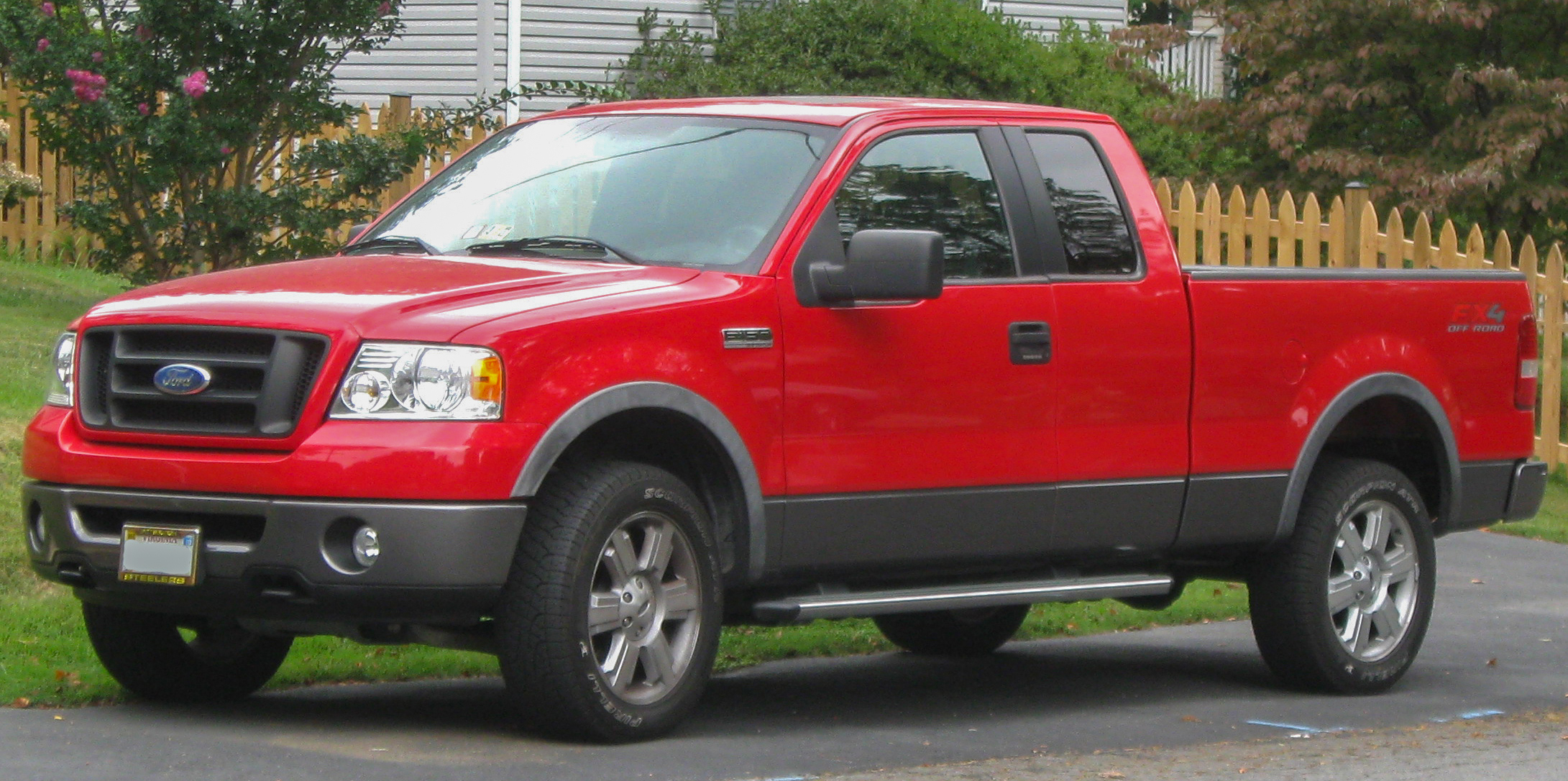

Overview
- Manufacturer: Ford Motor Company
- Also called: Ford Lobo (Mexico)
- Production: June 2003 – July 2008
- Model years: 2004–2008
- Assembly: Cuautitlán, Mexico; Dearborn, Michigan, U.S. Kansas City, Missouri, U.S. Norfolk, Virginia, U.S. Valencia, Venezuela (Valencia Assembly)
- Designer: Tyler Blake, Patrick Schiavone (1999, 2000)

Body and chassis
- Body style: 2-door pickup 4-door pickup
- Related: Ford Expedition; Lincoln Mark LT; Lincoln Navigator

Powertrain
- Engine: 4.2 L (256 CID) Essex V6; 4.6 L (281 CID) Triton V8; 5.4 L (330 CID) Triton V8
- Transmission: 4-speed automatic (4R75E, 4R70E); 5-speed manual ("M5OD-R2")

Dimensions
- Wheelbase: 126 in (3,200 mm) (Regular cab 6.5' box); 133 in (3,378 mm) (SuperCab 5.5' box); 139 in (3,531 mm) (SuperCrew 5.5' box); 145 in (3,683 mm) (SuperCab 6.5' box and regular cab 8' box); 151 in (3,835 mm) (SuperCrew 6.5' box); 163 in (4,140 mm) (SuperCab 8' box)
- Length: 211.8 in (5,380 mm) (Regular cab 6.5' box); 217.8 in (5,532 mm) (SuperCab 5.5' box); 223.8 in (5,685 mm) (SuperCrew 5.5' box); 229.8 in (5,837 mm) (SuperCab 6.5' box and regular cab 8' box); 235.8 in (5,989 mm) (SuperCrew 6.5' box); 247.8 in (6,294 mm) (SuperCab 8' box)
- Width: 78.9 inches (200 cm)
- Height: 73.5–76.1 inches (187–193 cm)
- Curb weight: 4,758–5,875 pounds (2,158–2,665 kg)

Chronology
- Predecessor: Ford F-Series (tenth generation) (MY 1997–2004)
- Successor: Ford F-Series (twelfth generation) (MY 2009–2014)

The eleventh generation of the Ford F-Series is a line of pickup trucks that was manufactured and marketed by Ford from the 2004 to 2008 model years. Slotted between the Ranger and the F-Series Super Duty pickup trucks, the F-150 was again redesigned separately from the heavier-duty F-250 and F-350 trucks. In addition to chassis and suspension upgrades, the redesign saw the F-150 adopt several design features of its Super Duty counterparts, including its triple-slot grille and front door windows with a stepped lower edge (the latter feature, in current production).

To streamline production costs, the two-door F-150 was replaced by a 2+2 door regular cab, featuring rear-hinged access panels (to access storage behind the seats); the design allowed the front doors to be shared with the 2+2 door SuperCab (featuring roll-down windows) and the 4-door SuperCrew. Along with becoming the last generation of the F-150 offered with a manual transmission, it is also the final version offered with the option of a Flareside bed design.

While the Ford SVT Lightning and Lincoln Blackwood were discontinued, the latter was replaced by the Lincoln Mark LT (in contrast to its predecessor, the Mark LT was much closer in functionality to the F-150). In Mexico, Ford marketed the model line under the Ford Lobo nameplate. The eleventh-generation F-150 also serves as the basis for the full-size Ford Expedition and Lincoln Navigator.

Ford assembled the model line in multiple facilities in the United States and Mexico.

== Background ==
Designed between 1998 and January 2000 by Tyler Blake under the design direction of Patrick Schiavone the styling was a more angular update of the previous PN-96 generation. On August 29, 2000, the final production design was frozen. Development began in 1997, with scheduled production for September 2002 alongside the U222 Expedition. Development later ended in 2003 because of delays.

Noticeably, the eleventh-generation side windows dipped at their leading edge. Most F-150s of this generation also featured two large "closed loop" front tow hooks (or no hooks on some 4×2 models) as opposed to conventional open hooks. The front doors on SuperCab models are wider than those on the Regular Cab or SuperCrew models.

== Trim levels ==
- XL – Included: Cloth upholstery, bench seat, 4.2L V6 engine (regular cab 4×2 models only), manual transmission (only available with 4.2L V6 and Styleside bed), manual mirrors, manual windows, manual locks, 17" steel wheels, air conditioning, an AM/FM stereo with clock, black vinyl floor covering, solar-tinted rear windows, front black fascia bumper, and black grille. For 2008, an XL SuperCrew model was introduced, featuring standard power locks/windows/mirrors, cloth seating, and AM/FM stereo with a single CD player.
- STX – Added: Body color bumpers, 17" cast aluminum alloy wheels, an AM/FM stereo with single-CD player and clock (and later, an auxiliary input jack in 2007, then MP3 capability in 2008), front seat center armrest and storage bin and cupholders, rear cupholders (SuperCab and SuperCrew), and a body-color grille surround.
- XLT – Added: Chrome front and rear step bumpers, black honeycomb grille, keyless entry, power mirrors, power accessory delay, color-coordinated carpet with floor mats, tachometer, non-adaptive automatic speed control, power windows and locks with automatic driver-door window and autolock, compass and outside temperature display, 17" steel wheels (7-lug wheels on Heavy Duty Payload Package), overhead console, deep-tinted rear windows, color coordinated steering wheel, and automatic headlamps.
- FX4 – Added: 5.4L Triton V8 engine, FX4 off road decals, color-coordinated bumpers, 17" machined alloy wheels, black leather-wrapped steering wheel, black rubber off-road floor mats, limited-slip rear axle, skid plates, fog lamps, monotone body-color bumpers, and off-road shocks.
- Lariat – Added: beige bumpers, two-tone paint, heated mirrors with turn signals, 18" alloy wheels, illuminated visor mirrors, automatic temperature control, rear window defroster, carpeted floor mats, an AM/FM radio with single CD and cassette player (2004 only), message center, color-coordinated leather-wrapped steering wheel with audio and climate controls, power driver's seat, leather-trimmed seats, and auto-dimming rear-view mirror.

== Powertrain ==
Initially, the 4.6 L Triton engine and the new 3-valve 5.4 L three-valve-per-cylinder Triton V8 engines, respectively mated to a 4R70E and 4R75E four-speed automatic transmission, were the only two powertrain combinations available on the new trucks. For the 2005 model year, Ford's 4.2 L Essex V6—mated to either a manual transmission or a four-speed automatic—became available on regular cab 4×2 models and automatic headlamps became available. This generation of F-150 is the last Ford vehicle with a gasoline pushrod V6.

Engine	Years	Power	Torque	Notes
4.2 L V6	2005–2008	210 hp (157 kW) @ 4350 rpm	260 lb⋅ft (353 N⋅m) @ 3750 rpm	Standard on regular cab 4×2 models only
4.6 L V8	2004–2006	231 hp (172 kW) @ 4750 rpm	293 lb⋅ft (397 N⋅m) @ 3500 rpm	
4.6 L V8	2007–2008	248 hp (185 kW) @ 4750 rpm	294 lb⋅ft (399 N⋅m) @ 4000 rpm	
5.4 L V8	2004–2008	300 hp (224 kW) @ 5000 rpm	365 lb⋅ft (495 N⋅m) @ 3750 rpm	Standard on FX4, Lariat, and higher trims; not available on STX

== Updates and editions ==
=== 2006 ===
For the 2006 model year, a flex-fuel version of the 3-valve 5.4 L Triton V8 became available (except on models with the Heavy-Duty Payload Package, Flareside box, or Harley-Davidson trim), and the SuperCrew model was made available with the 6.5' box. The front bumper was also refreshed with circular fog lamps and a smaller bumper vent. Other updates included improved front seats with revised side bolstering, and new 20" wheels available for FX4, Lariat, and King Ranch. A navigation system was optional for the first time on the Lariat, King Ranch, and Harley Davidson trim. Ford offered an XLT Chrome Package, also known as XTR in Canada, as well as a Lariat Chrome package. SIRIUS satellite radio became available on all trims except the XL. The FX4 became more upscale with a Luxury package. A Harley-Davidson special edition was offered for 2006, available on SuperCab models with two- or all-wheel-drive. Other mid-cycle revisions included five-inch running boards, traction assist on 4×2 V8 models, and "Smokestone Clearcoat Metallic" paint for the Lariat trim.

=== 2007 ===
For 2007, Ford introduced a complement to the existing FX4 model, the new FX2 Sport package (a 4×2 truck with an appearance package). A SuperCrew was offered in the Harley-Davidson trim as well. Ford states that a properly equipped 2007 F-150 (regular cab or SuperCab 8' box 4×2) can tow up to 11,000 lb (5,000 kg) and carry a maximum payload of 1800–3050 lb.

=== 2008 ===
For 2008, a 60th anniversary package became available to celebrate 60 years of the Ford F-Series. This was also the last year for this generation, as well as the last year of the F-150 with manual transmission. For the first time, the SuperCrew cab became available on the XL trim.

=== S331 ===
Saleen has offered its own OEM version of the F-150, badged as the S331. Additionally, Roush has offered an aftermarket version with similar power. Beginning with the second half of the 2007 model year, Ford offered the Saleen forced-induction package on the Harley-Davidson edition as an OEM option.

=== F-150 Foose Edition ===
The F-150 Foose Edition debuted in fall 2007 as a 2008 model. Based on an F-150 FX2 Sport, it uses a Roush-developed powertrain. The supercharged 5.4 L V8 puts out 450 hp (340 kW) and 500 lb⋅ft (680 N⋅m) of torque.

=== Heavy Duty Payload Package ===
The Heavy Duty Payload Package (HDPP) marked a significant advancement from the prior-generation F-150, which had a 7,700-pound GVWR. The HDPP introduced several enhancements, including a reinforced frame and suspension, LT245/70R17D BSW all-season tires mounted on 17-inch steel seven-lug rims, and a more robust 10.25-inch rear axle with a 4.10:1 ratio (optionally with limited-slip differential), resulting in an increased GVWR of 8,200 pounds. Additionally, it featured a 72-ampere-hour battery, an improved radiator, and an upgraded transmission oil cooler. The HDPP configuration was exclusively offered with the 5.4 L V8 engine and the 8-foot bed, and was standard on SuperCab models with the 8-foot bed and optional on Regular Cab models.

== Safety ==
The F-150 received top safety ratings (five stars) from the U.S. National Highway Traffic Safety Administration (NHTSA) in frontal collisions, and not only got a "Good" rating from the Insurance Institute for Highway Safety's frontal offset test, but also a Best Pick. The dummy sensors recorded no injuries to any body region.

== Awards and sales ==
The 11th generation F-150 earned the North American Truck of the Year award for 2004 and was Motor Trend magazine's Truck of the Year for 2004. It also beat the three-time winning Chevrolet Silverado for Car and Driver magazine's Best Pickup Truck for 2004 and 2005. Over 939,000 F-Series trucks were sold in 2005, a single-year sales record for trucks.

The 2006 F-150 was named Fleet Truck of the Year by Automotive Fleet and Business Fleet magazines, and the 2007 models of the F-150, F-250 and F-350 were chosen Best Fleet Value vehicles in their respective categories by automotive data-analysis firm Vincentric. It was also named the Winner of the 2006–2007 Golden Icon Award (presented by Travolta Family Entertainment) for "Best Truck."

== Gallery ==
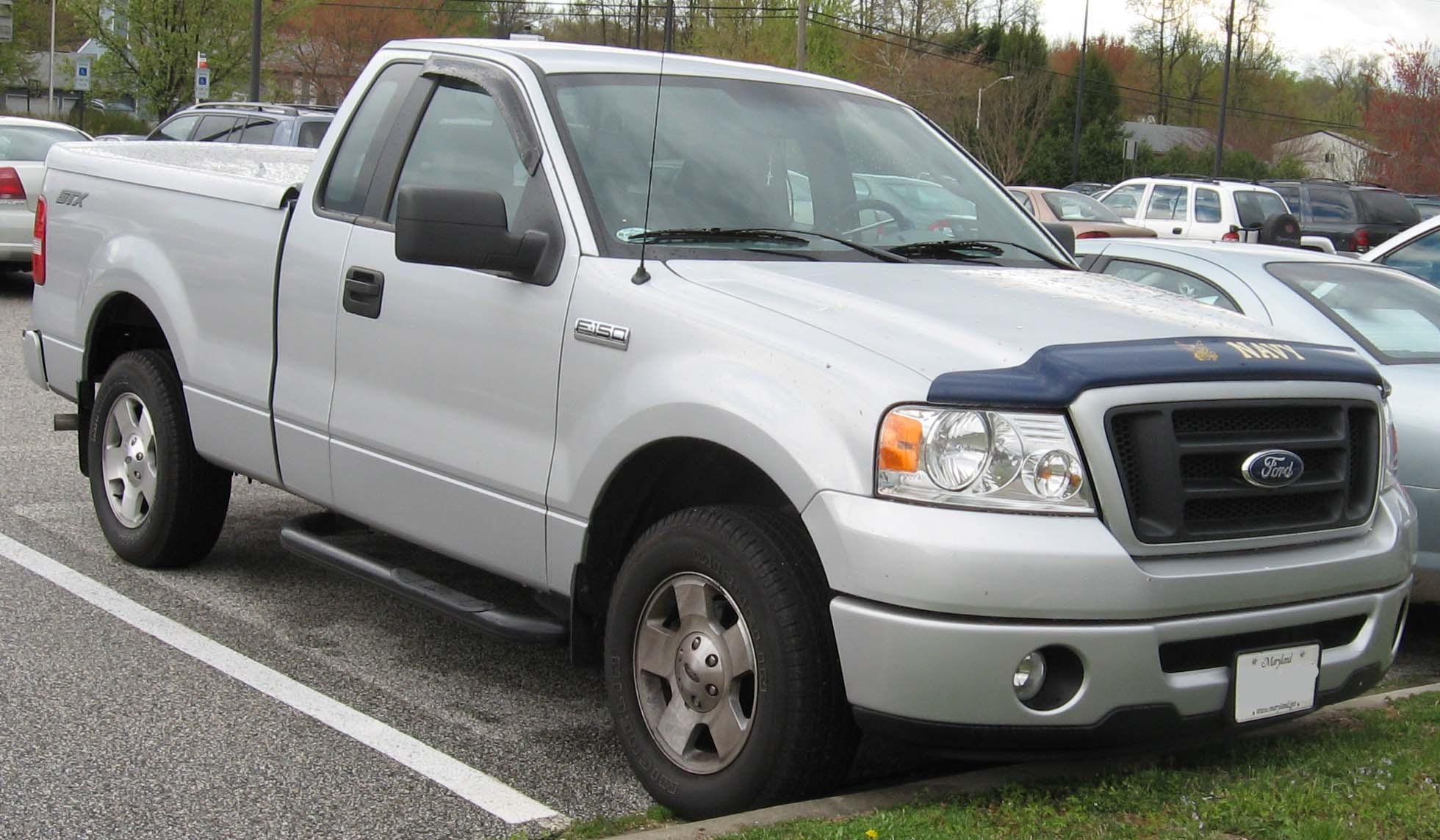
Ford F-150 regular cab

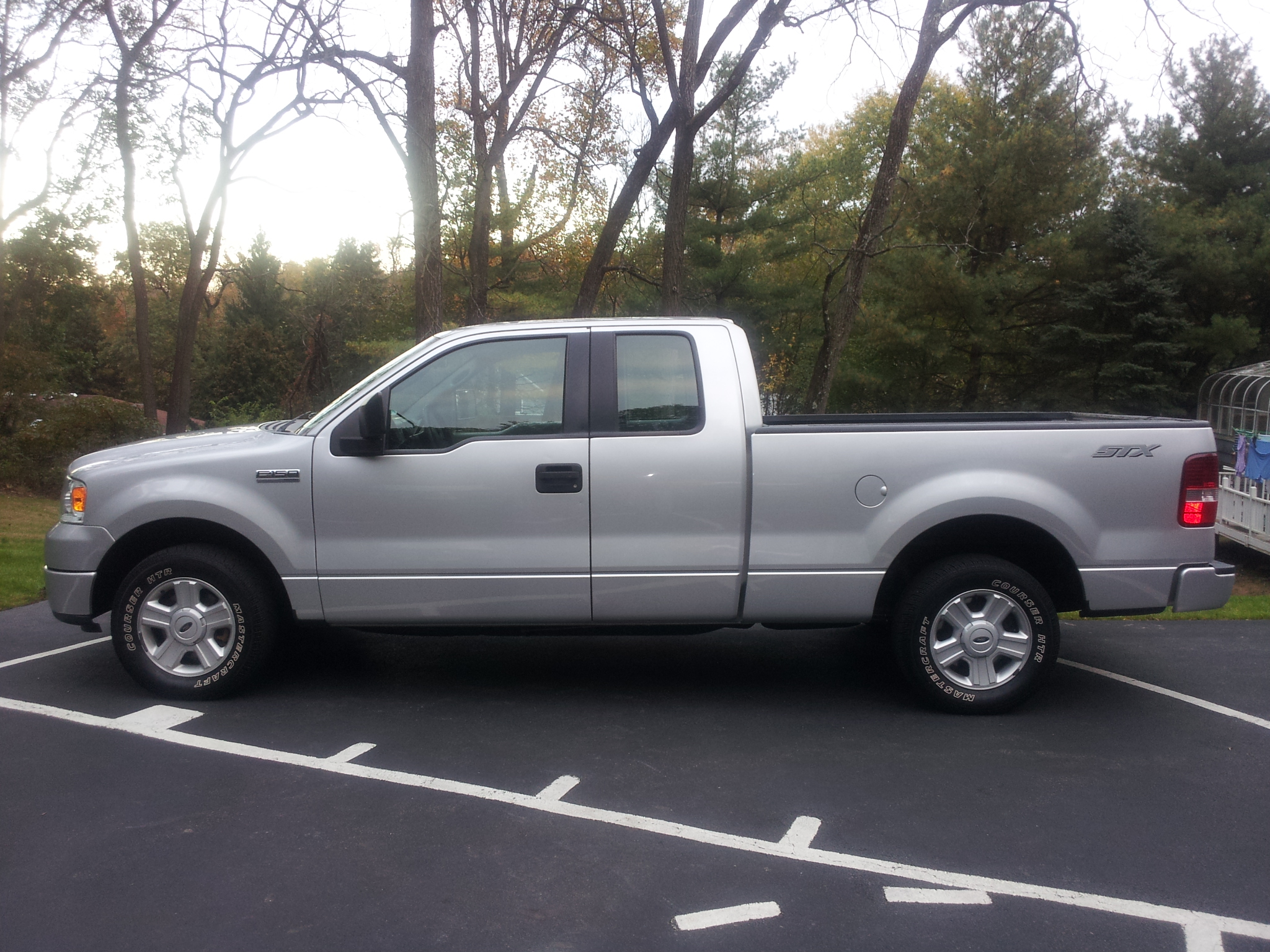
2005 F-150 STX SuperCab

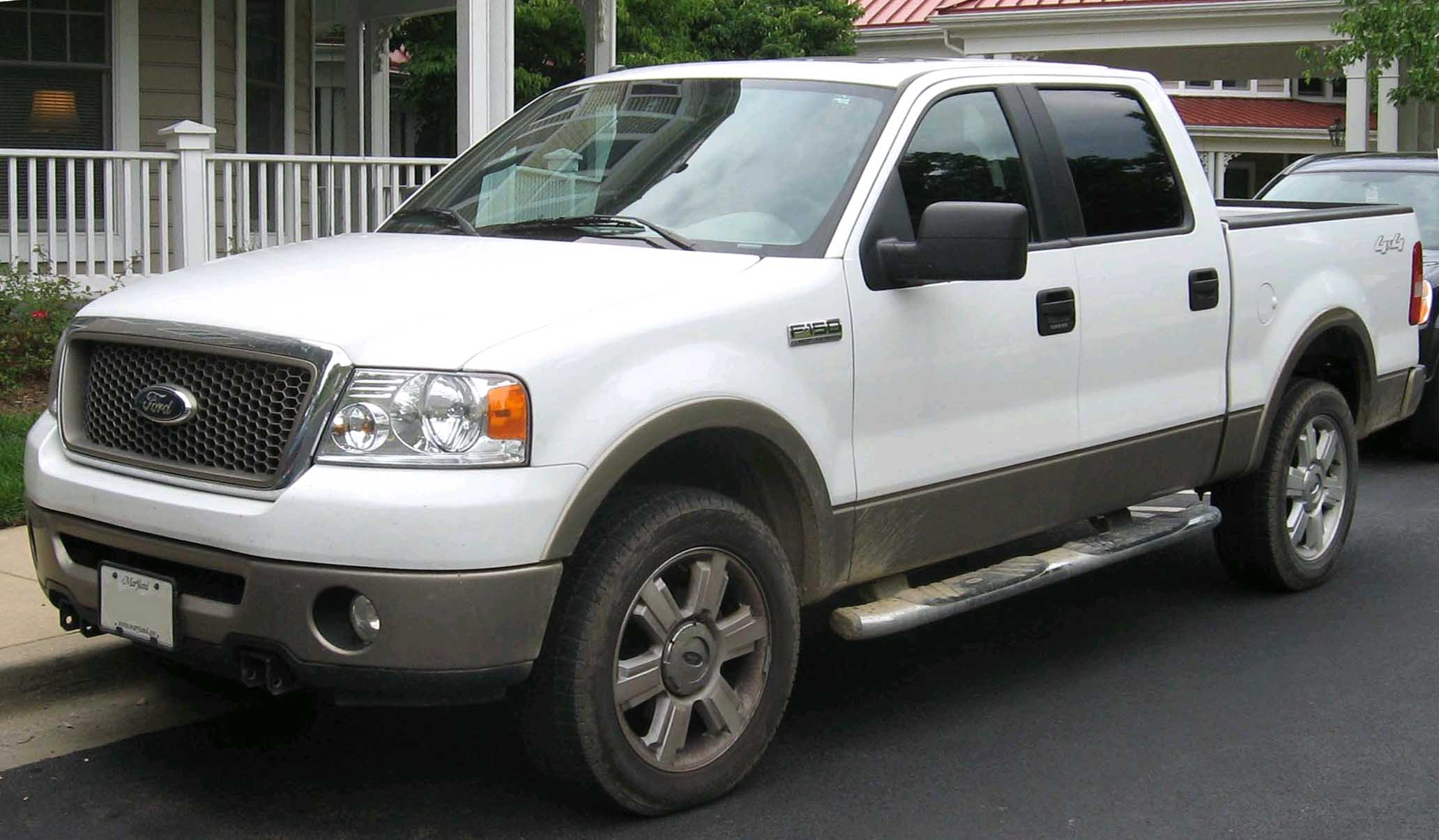
Ford F-150 Lariat SuperCrew

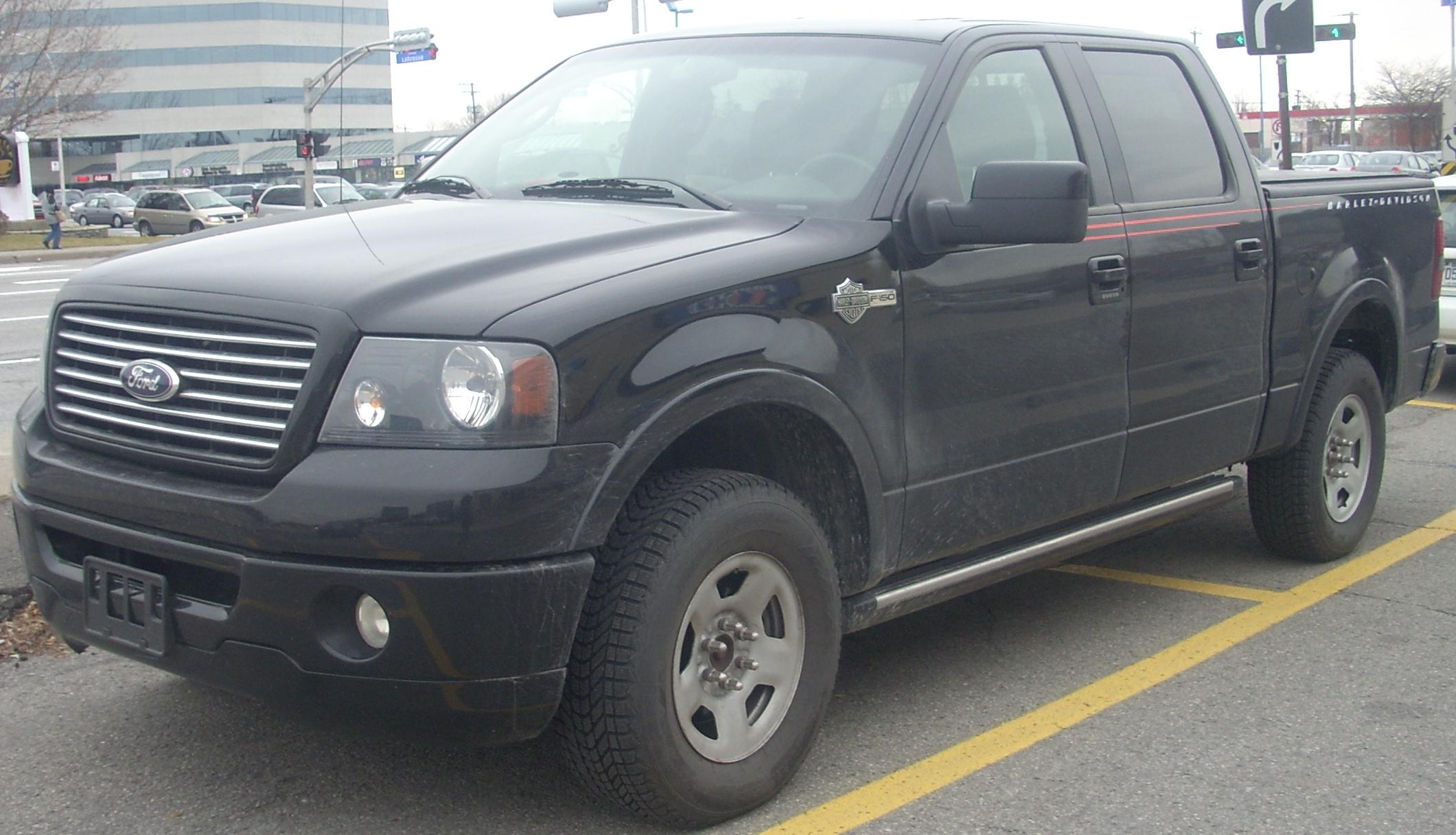
2007–2008 F-150 Harley Davidson SuperCrew

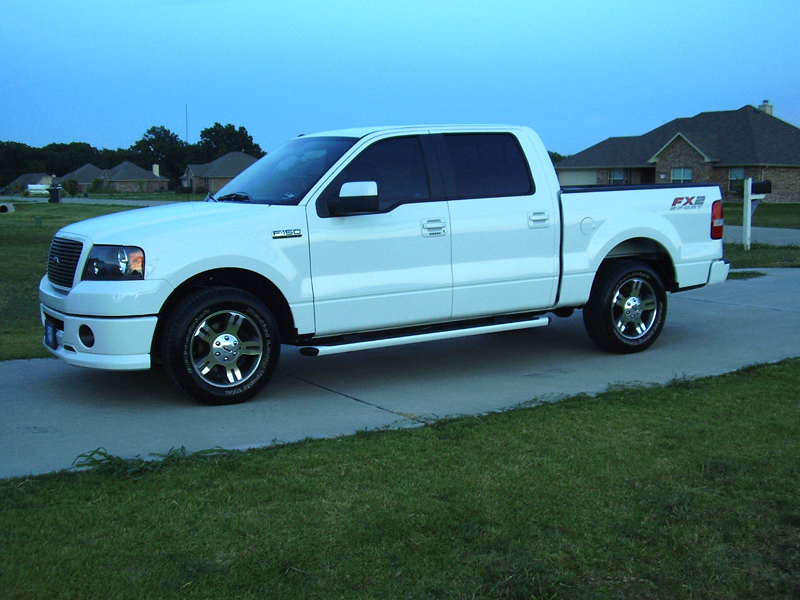
2008 F-150 FX2 SuperCrew

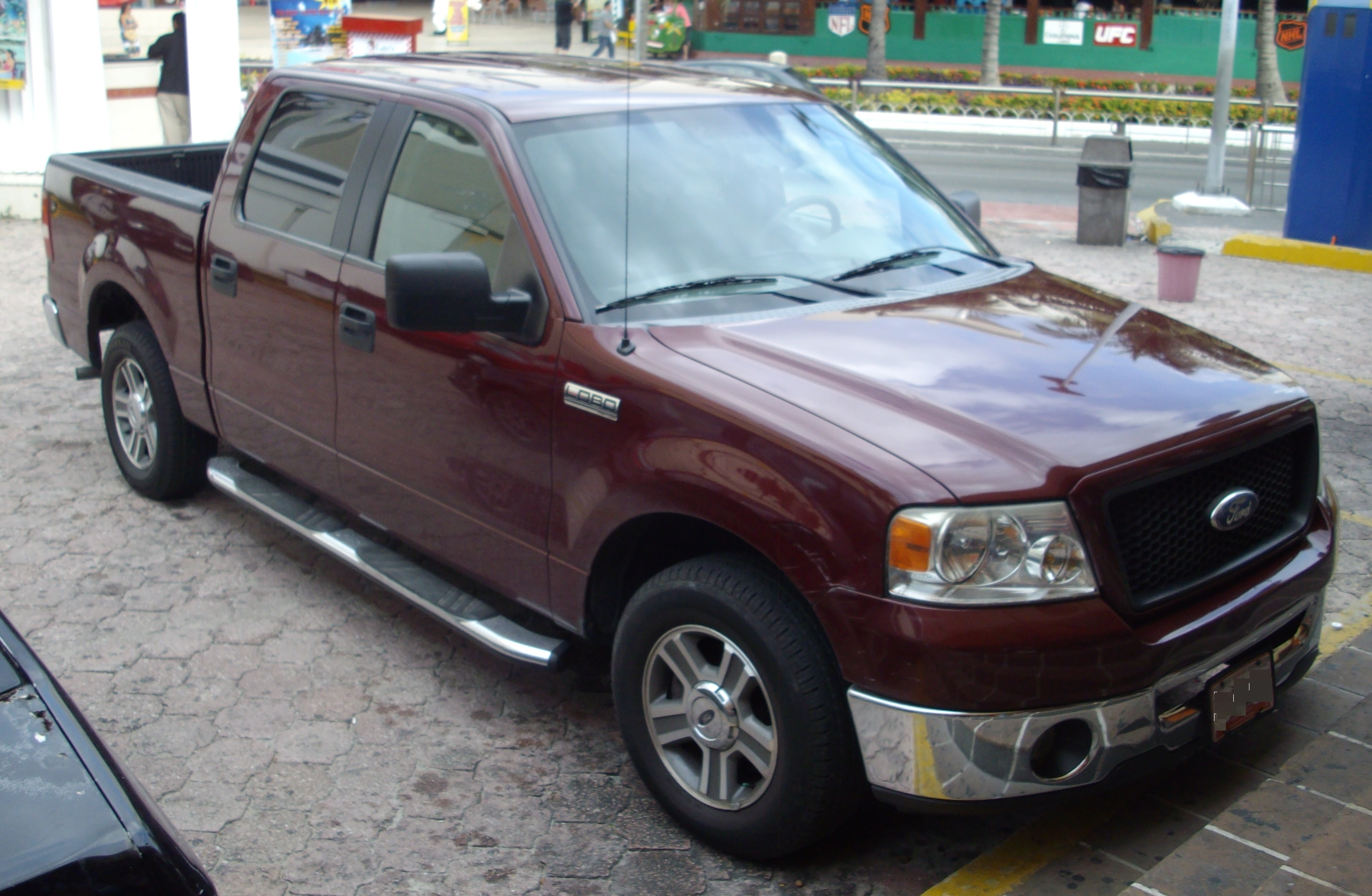
Ford Lobo Crew Cab
