= Ford F-150 Lightning Rod =

Pickup truck concept vehicle

Overview
- Manufacturer: Ford Motor Company
- Model code: PN96
- Designer: Under the lead of Ed Golden

Body and chassis
- Class: Concept car
- Body style: 2-door pickup truck
- Layout: Front-engine, rear-wheel-drive

Powertrain
- Engine: 5.4L Triton V8
- Transmission: 4-speed 4R100 automatic

The Ford F-150 Lightning Rod is a 2-door pickup truck concept car designed by Ford and based on the 10th-generation Ford F-150. It debuted at the 2001 Chicago Auto Show.

== Design ==
The Lightning Rod concept features red paint and a red leather tonneau cover with a Maori-inspired design. The red theme continues into the interior. The concept model also featured 21-inch Fuchs style wheels. Ford's then-design chief Ed Golden said in a 2001 press release that the concept was inspired by 1960s muscle cars and the hot rod culture.

== Powertrain ==
The concept used the same powertrain as the standard F-150 Lightning. The engine was a supercharged 5.4L Triton V8 engine making 380 horsepower and 450 lb-ft of torque mated to a 4R100 4-speed automatic transmission.
