= Ford F-Series (tenth generation) =

Tenth generation of the Ford F-Series pickup trucks

Tenth generation (PN-96)
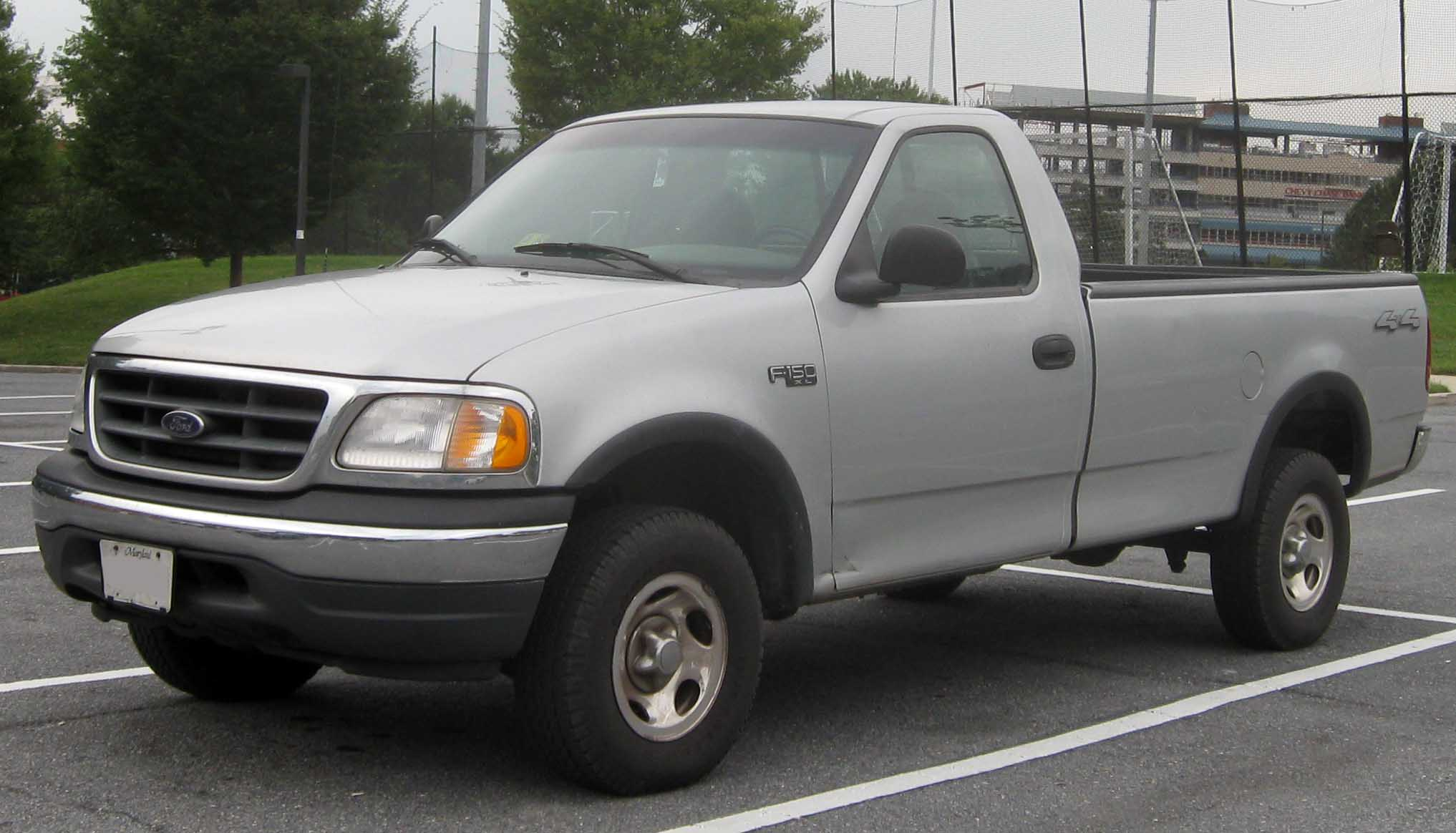

Overview
- Manufacturer: Ford Motor Company
- Also called: Ford Lobo (Mexico); Ford F-150 Heritage (2004 only)
- Production: November 29, 1995 – June 28, 2004; July 1996–1999 (F-250); 1996–2009 (Mexico)
- Model years: 1997–2004; 1997–1999 (F-250)
- Assembly: Kansas City Assembly (Claycomo, Missouri); Norfolk Assembly (Norfolk, Virginia); Kentucky Truck Assembly (Louisville, Kentucky); Ontario Truck Plant (Oakville, Ontario, Canada); Cuautitlán Assembly (Cuautitlán, Mexico); Valencia Assembly (Valencia, Venezuela)
- Designer: Andrew Jacobson; Bob Aikins (concept: 1992, production design: 1993)

Body and chassis
- Class: Full-size pickup truck
- Body style: 2-door regular cab; 2+1-door extended cab; 2+2-door extended cab; 4-door Crew cab pickup
- Layout: FR layout 4WD layout
- Platform: Ford P platform
- Related: Lincoln Blackwood; Ford Expedition; Lincoln Navigator

Powertrain
- Engine: 4.2 L Essex V6; 4.6 L Triton V8; 5.4 L Triton V8; 5.4 L Triton S/C V8
- Transmission: 4-speed 4R70W automatic; 4-speed E4OD automatic (1997–1998 5.4 L only); 4-speed 4R100 automatic (5.4 L only); 5-speed M5OD-R2 manual

Dimensions
- Wheelbase: Regular cab/6.5' bed: 119.9 in (3,045 mm); Regular cab/8' bed, SuperCab/6.5' bed, and SuperCrew: 138.8 in (3,526 mm); SuperCab/8' bed: 157.1 in (3,990 mm)
- Length: Regular cab/6.5' bed: 202.2 in (5,136 mm); Regular cab/8' bed, SuperCab/6.5' bed, and SuperCrew: 222.3 in (5,646 mm); SuperCab/8' bed: 239.4 in (6,081 mm)
- Width: 79.5 in (2,019 mm)
- Height: 72.7 in (1,847 mm) (4×2); 75.1 in (1,908 mm) (4×4)

Chronology
- Predecessor: Ford F-Series ninth generation (1992–1996)
- Successor: Ford F-Series eleventh generation (2004–2008)

The tenth generation of the Ford F-Series is a line of pickup trucks produced by Ford Motor Company from the 1997 to 2004 model years. The first ground-up redesign of the F-Series since 1979, the tenth generation saw the introduction of an all-new chassis and a completely new body. In a significant model change, the tenth generation was developed only for the F-150 (and later a light-duty F-250), with the ninth-generation F-250 and F-350 replaced by the all-new Ford Super Duty variant of the F-Series for 1999. Marketed as the SuperCrew, a crew-cab configuration was also offered, beginning with the 2001 model year.

Alongside its all-new body and chassis, the tenth-generation F-150 saw further changes to the F-Series line, including the retirement of the Twin-I-Beam front suspension (the first Ford light truck to do so), an entirely new engine lineup, and the addition of a rear door (later two) to SuperCab trucks. The F-150 again served as the basis for Ford full-size SUVs, as the long-running Ford Bronco was replaced by the five-door Ford Expedition for 1997, with Lincoln-Mercury introducing the Lincoln Navigator for 1998. For 2002, Lincoln-Mercury marketed its own version of the F-Series, introducing the Lincoln Blackwood as Lincoln's first pickup truck.

Through its production, the model line was assembled by multiple Ford facilities in the United States, Canada, and Mexico; after its replacement in 2004, this generation was rebranded as the Ford Lobo in Mexico from 2004 to 2010 (when it was replaced by the twelfth-generation F-150).

== Development ==
In late 1989, during mid-stage development of a facelift due in late 1991 for the 1992 model year, Ford commenced the PN-96 program on a new truck platform and designated Thomas Baughman as chief engineer. In mid-1990, Andrew Jacobson was designated as design director for the PN-96 truck program. By 1991, designers had developed clay models indicative of car-like styling, based on a new design theme.

Despite the disapproval from focus groups towards "softer" styling during 1991 and 1992 in concept design clinics, Ford management backed the "aero" design philosophy. The end result by Bob Aikins reached in November 1992 and frozen for production in February 1993, took the aero styling further with a rounded nose on the new F-Series. The PN-96 mules went into testing 1993, with prototypes running from early 1994. Pilot production began in 1995. Continuing with the idea of a "smoother" design, Ford decided to upgrade the front suspension to an independent, which gives more comfort and maneuverability, leaving behind the old twin beam suspension.

== 1997–2004 ==
Being the F-150's first major redesign since late 1979, the redesigned truck went on a nationwide 87-stop tour to Ford plants and the external part suppliers in October 1995, prior to its release. To build anticipation for the redesigned truck, the 1997 model was released on January 25, 1996, with the first ad campaigns airing during Super Bowl XXX. Because of the radical styling, Ford predicted from marketing clinics that traditional truck buyers would not receive the radical and car-like 1997 well, so it continued to produce and sell the previous 1996 model alongside the redesigned 1997 model for a few months.

A wide variety of body options were available: the 2–3 passenger 2-door regular cab and the 5–6 passenger 3-door SuperCab (4-door after 1999 MY), 8 ft (2.4 m) and 6.5 ft (2.0 m) beds, and a choice of Styleside or Flareside beds on 6.5 ft (2.0 m) models. The high-performance trim "Lightning" was introduced in March 1999, and Harley-Davidson and King Ranch editions were also produced for the 2000 and 2001 model years, respectively. In 1999, the SuperCrew cab was introduced with four full-size doors for the 2001 model year. A Sport 4×4 model was also introduced in 1999. It featured the 5.4L Triton V8 and color-matched bumpers and mirror housings, and was available in regular cab and SuperCab in four colors: white, red, black, and silver. In 2002, an FX4 model was introduced, which came with skid plates, a carbon steel frame, Rancho shock absorbers, and unique 17" aluminum wheels, along with more standard features that were optional on XLT. In 2003, a sporty STX trim package was introduced, aimed at younger truck buyers. The STX package featured color-keyed front/rear bumpers along with clear lens headlights and integrated round fog lamps. The package also featured chrome step rails, 17" chrome wheels, and a Kenwood Z828 stereo in place of the standard Ford radio. Also in 2003, a special trim package "Heritage Edition" version with special badging was produced to mark the 100th anniversary of the Ford Motor Company, available only in the 139-inch wheelbase SuperCab model.

Sales of the F-150 surged in the tenth generation from 750,000 to over 900,000 in 2001 as products from General Motors and Chrysler lagged. Ford's sales dropped, however, for the final years of this generation as the redesigned Dodge Ram and refreshed Chevrolet Silverado and GMC Sierra were released.

The new F-150 was Motor Trend magazine's Truck of the Year in 1997. The tenth-generation F-150 had a minor facelift in September 1998, along with some minor interior updates to the 1999 model, including a redesigned instrument cluster and new door panels for the additional door. The manual transmission was removed from the Lariat for the 1999 model year, which was also the last year of the regular cab in Lariat trim. On December 13, 1999, production began on the SuperCrew cab, which launched in February 2000 as an early 2001 model.

Ford also produced a limited number of F-150s with 2003 body styles, which were marketed as "F-150 Heritage" (not to be confused with the 2003 "Heritage Edition"). The only exterior change for 2004 models was that the headlamps had fully amber turn signal lenses. The SuperCrew body style and the Lariat trim were dropped, leaving only the XL and XLT trims available. The manual transmission option with the 4.6 L V8 was also discontinued. The final tenth-generation F-150 rolled off the assembly line on June 28, 2004.

This generation of F-150 was sold in Mexico alongside the new eleventh-generation F-Series through 2008. It was only available as a Regular Cab and in XL trim, while the newer model was available in more trims. SuperCab and SuperCrew configurations and the new model was badged as Lobo, while the older model retained the F-150 name.

== Powertrain ==
This generation of F-150 features an all-new lineup of engines, each more efficient than the ones they replaced. A 4.2-liter OHV V6, based on Ford's 3.8-liter Essex V6, replaced the 4.9-liter inline-six, while the 4.6- and 5.4-liter SOHC V8s replaced the 5.0- and 5.8-liter OHV V8s. The new V8s were marketed under the "Triton" name and mark the first use of Ford's Modular single overhead cam (SOHC) engines in the F-Series pickups. Ford's own 8.8" torsion-bar front suspension replaced the Dana 44 Twin-Traction Beam front end, while the Ford 8.8" rear axle remained standard. The Ford 9.75 axle was standard behind the 5.4L, but optional behind the 4.6L. In 2000, the Sterling 10.25 axle became part of the 7,700-lb GVWR package.

Engines:

Engine	Years	Power	Torque	Notes
4.2 L Essex V6	1997–2004	205 hp (153 kW)	260 lb⋅ft (353 N⋅m)	Regular Cab and 4×2 SuperCab models in base, XL, and XLT trims only
4.6 L Triton V8	1997–2000	220 hp (164 kW)	280 lb⋅ft (380 N⋅m)	
4.6 L Triton V8	2001–2004	231 hp (172 kW)	293 lb⋅ft (397 N⋅m)	
5.4 L Triton V8	1997–1998	235 hp (175 kW)	330 lb⋅ft (447 N⋅m)	
5.4 L Triton V8	1999–2004	260 hp (194 kW)	350 lb⋅ft (475 N⋅m)	
5.4 L Supercharged Triton V8	1999–2000	360 hp (268 kW)	440 lb⋅ft (597 N⋅m)	Lightning only
5.4 L Supercharged Triton V8	2001–2004	380 hp (283 kW)	450 lb⋅ft (610 N⋅m)	Lightning only
5.4 L Supercharged Triton V8	1999–2004	340 hp (254 kW)	425 lb⋅ft (576 N⋅m)	Harley-Davidson only

== Trim ==
- Standard (1998), Work Series (1999–2000); became a more basic package for the XL in 2001 – Included: Vinyl upholstery, bench seat, manual mirrors, steel wheels, 4-pin trailer wiring, manual windows, an AM/FM stereo with a clock, and a manual transmission.
- XL – Included: Chrome bumpers, manual mirrors, styled-steel wheels, poly knit (later, cloth) upholstery, bench seat, manual windows, a manual or automatic transmission, and an AM/FM stereo with a clock (and later, a cassette player).
- XLT – Added: aluminum wheels, cloth upholstery, tinted rear windows, cargo box light, tachometer, power windows and locks with automatic driver's side window, an AM/FM stereo with a cassette player (later, a single-CD player) and clock, air conditioning, and later, a leather wrapped steering wheel, an overhead console with compass and garage openers, speed-dependent wipers, and power mirrors.
- Lariat – Added: 4.6L Triton V8 engine, cast aluminum wheels, carpeted floor mats, power mirrors with turn signals, power driver's seat, automatic headlamps, leather trimmed seats, anti-lock brake system, and later, an automatic transmission, an AM/FM stereo with single-CD and cassette players and clock, and Ford's proprietary keypad entry system, marketed as SecuriCode.
- King Ranch – Added: leather upholstery, heated seats, captain chairs and a 6-disc CD changer.

== Safety ==
This generation of F-150 received two five-star ratings from the National Highway Traffic Safety Administration, in direct contrast to the "Poor" rating by the Insurance Institute for Highway Safety (IIHS) in the frontal offset test,

Ford has found that the cruise control system in many of its trucks could catch fire because the switch system could corrode over time, overheat, and ignite. Ignition was later blamed on spillage from the adjacent master cylinder. On March 5, 2007, Ford recalled 155,000 2003 full-size pickups and full-size SUVs for the defective part. During the previous two years, Ford had recalled 5.8 million vehicles in because of the defective cruise control systems in trucks, SUVs, and vans. That recall, one of the largest in history, covered vehicles from the 1994–2002 model years.

== Variants ==
=== F-250 light-duty (1997–1999) ===
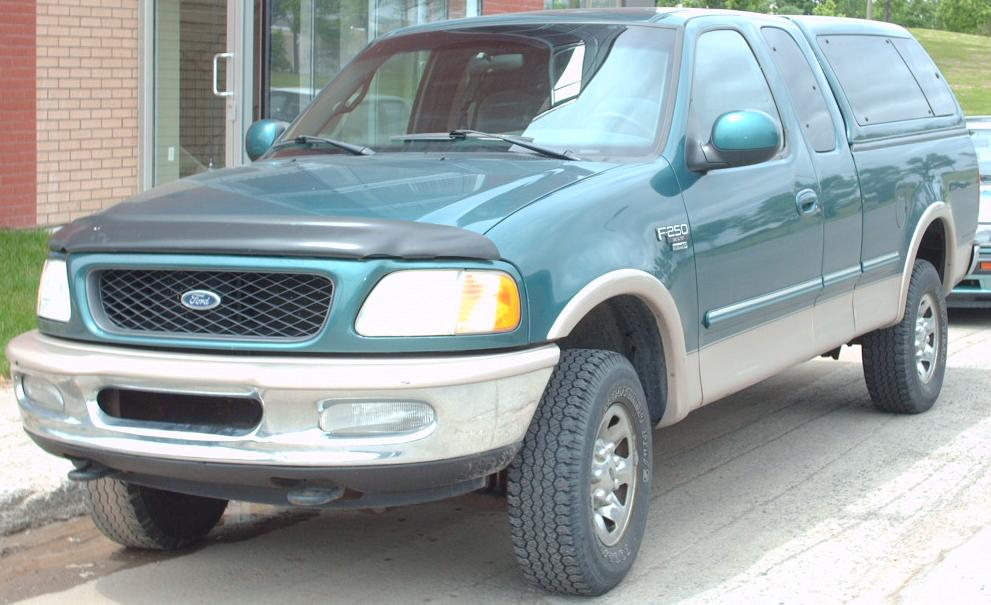
1997–1998 Ford F-250 XLT SuperCab

At its January 1996 launch, the 1997 PN96 F-Series was only offered as a F-150; the F-250 and F-350 were produced as 1996 models on the previous-generation chassis. To bridge the gap between the F-150 and the heavier-duty pickups, a PN96 version of the F-250 light-duty was introduced nearly a year later (though also a 1997 model), slotted between the F-150 and the F-250HD of the previous-generation chassis. While nearly externally identical to the F-150 in terms of options and styling, the F-250 gained increased load capability thanks to a Sterling 10.25" rear axle and a heavier-duty rear suspension; the F-250 was distinguished by seven-lug wheels.

The PN-96 F-250 light-duty was marketed from 1997 to 1999, with Ford offering two generations of the vehicle under the same nameplate. For 1999, the F-250HD and F-350 were replaced by the Super Duty F-Series; the suspension components of the PN-96 F-250 continued as a "7700" option package from 2000 to 2003.

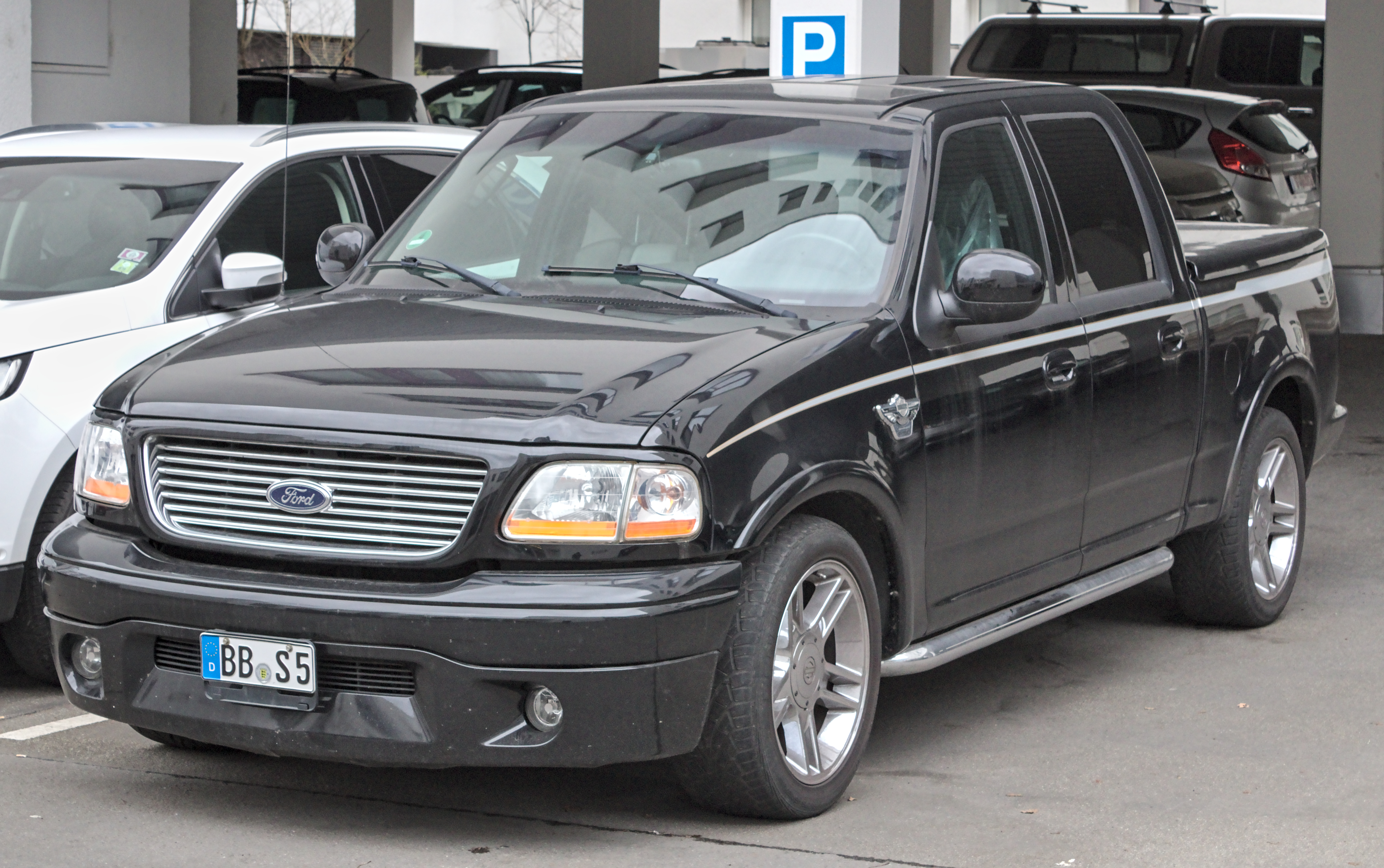
Ford F-150 SuperCrew Harley-Davidson Edition

=== SVT Lightning (1999–2004) ===
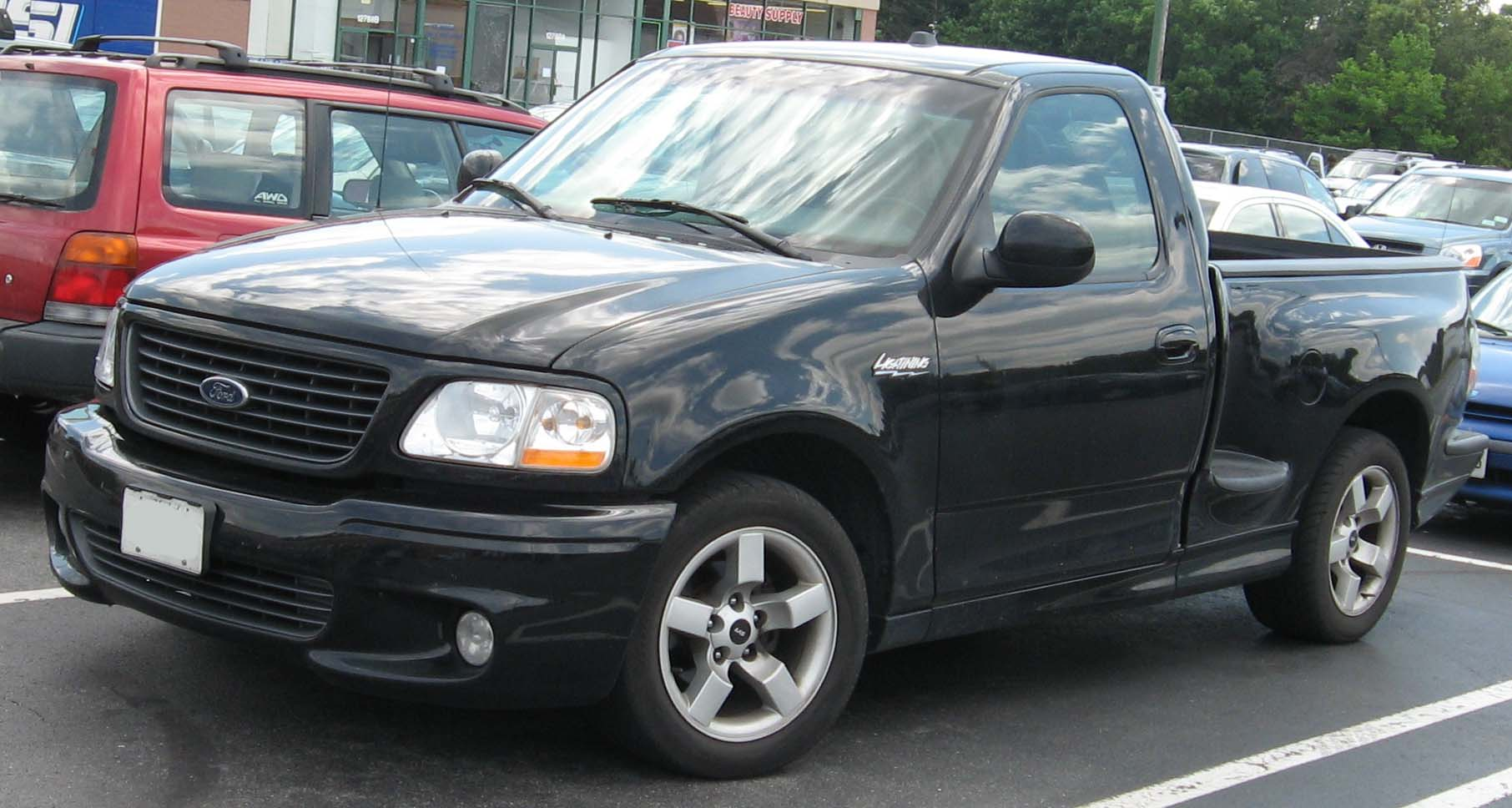
2001–2003 Ford F-150 SVT Lightning

The Ford SVT Lightning is a sports/performance version of the F-150, developed by the SVT (Special Vehicle Team) division of Ford. For 1999, the second generation of the Lightning was released using the PN96 platform, after a three-year hiatus of the model line. As with its 1993–1995 predecessor, the Lightning was based on the F-150; all versions were produced with a regular cab, rear-wheel drive, and a 6 1/2-foot (2,000 mm) bed length. In sharp contrast to its predecessor, the 1999–2002 Lightning was given a payload of 800 pounds (360 kg) (half the payload of a Ranger); for 2003, the figure was raised to 1,350 pounds (610 kg).

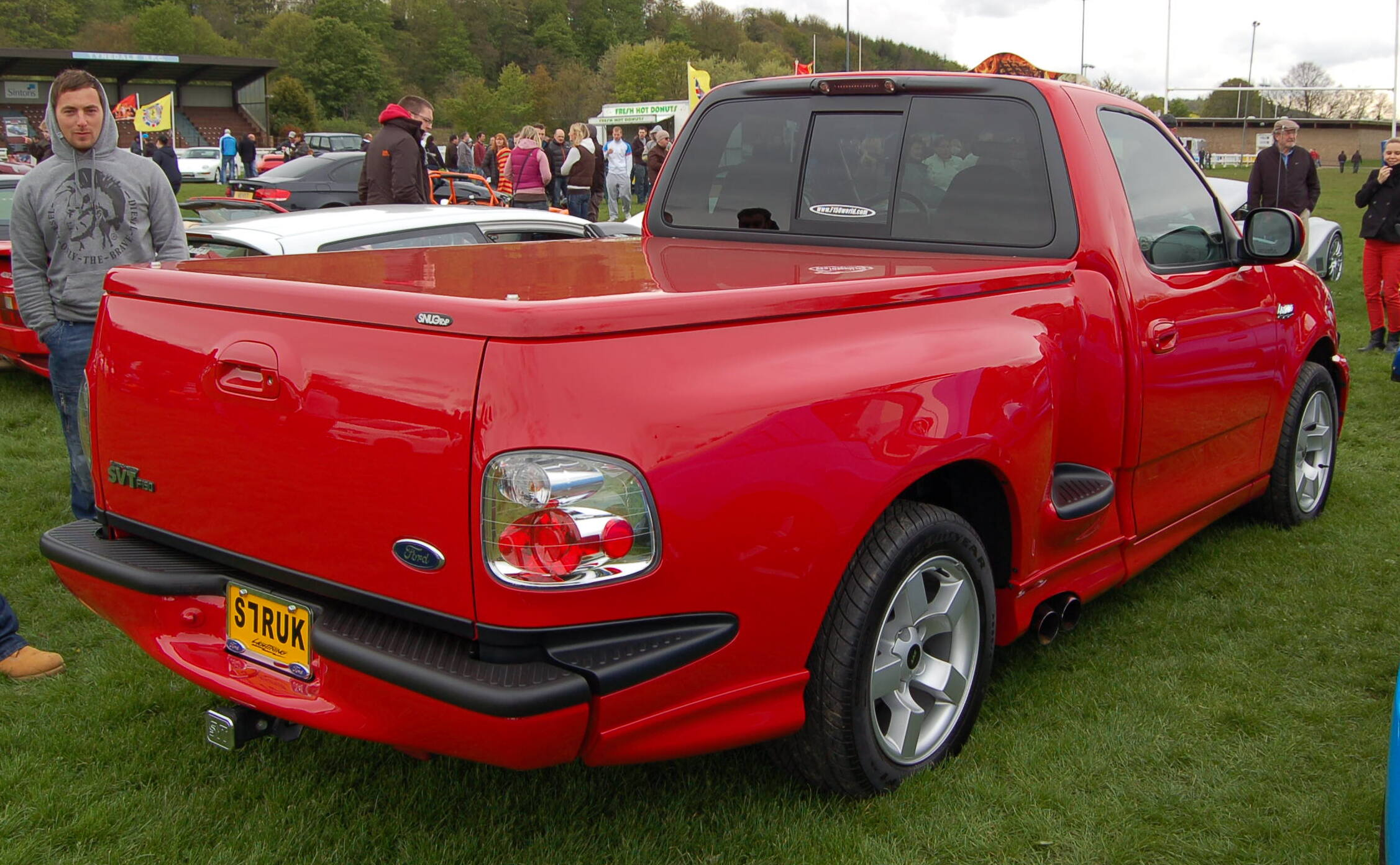
Ford F-150 SVT Lightning rear

While the first-generation Lightning chassis was a hybrid of the F-150 and F-250, to save weight and lower its cost, the second-generation adopted the stock F-150 frame. To improve handling, while the stock short/long arm front suspension configuration was used, the Lightning was lowered one inch with a 31mm stabilizer bar; the rear solid axle with leaf springs was lowered two inches, using a 23mm stabilizer bar. Monroe shocks were used from 1999 to 2001; Bilstein shocks were used from 2002 to 2004. In place of the 17-inch wheels of its predecessor, the second-generation Lightning was given 18-inch wheels with Goodyear Eagle F1 directional tires developed for the truck.

The second-generation Lightning was powered by a 5.4L Triton SOHC V8 equipped with an Eaton M112 supercharger. At its launch, the Lightning produced 360 hp (268 kW; 365 PS) and 440 ft⋅lbf (597 N⋅m) of torque, increased to 380 hp (283 kW) and 450 ft⋅lbf (610 N⋅m) of torque in 2001. The supercharged V8 was paired with a 4-speed Ford 4R100 overdrive automatic transmission (shared with the contemporary Super Duty). From 1999 to 2000, the rear axle ratio was 3.55:1, shortened to 3.73:1 in 2001. The same year, a 4.5-inch (110 mm) aluminum driveshaft replaced a 3.5-inch (89 mm) steel unit.

Following the 2001 drivetrain revisions, Car and Driver magazine tested a Lightning, accelerating from 0–60 mph (97 km/h) in 5.2 seconds.

During its production, the 1999–2004 F-150 Lightning was offered in a limited variety of colors. Initially produced in Bright Red, Black, and White, for 2000, Silver was introduced. For 2002, True Blue (a very dark blue) was introduced, but was replaced by a lighter Sonic Blue for 2003, along with Dark Shadow Gray.

The Ford SVT Lightning was manufactured by Ford of Canada at its Ontario Truck facility in Oakville, Ontario; it was closed in 2004. Special features specific to the Lightning included:

- 5.4 L 2V Triton Supercharged Intercooled V8 engine
- Modified 4R100 4-speed automatic transmission with OD lockout
- Eaton Detroit Locker Rear Differential
- Auxiliary transmission fluid cooler
- Eaton M112 supercharger
- Engine super cooling system
- Heavy duty battery
- Unique front fascia with integrated, round fog lamps
- Unique upper and lower grilles
- Unique front lower air deflectors
- Unique cab rocker and lower box moldings
- Unique wheels and tires
- 4-wheel ABS / 4-wheel disc brakes
- Heavy duty front and rear shock absorbers

Year	Engine	Configuration	Output		Transmission	Production
Year	Engine	Configuration	Power	Torque	Transmission	Production
1999	Ford Triton V8	5.4 L (330 cu in) SOHC V8 (Eaton M112 supercharger)	360 hp (268 kW)	440 ft⋅lbf (597 N⋅m)	4-speed Ford 4R100 overdrive automatic	4,000
2000	Ford Triton V8	5.4 L (330 cu in) SOHC V8 (Eaton M112 supercharger)	360 hp (268 kW)	440 ft⋅lbf (597 N⋅m)	4-speed Ford 4R100 overdrive automatic	4,966
2001	Ford Triton V8	5.4 L (330 cu in) SOHC V8 (Eaton M112 supercharger)	380 hp (283 kW)	450 ft⋅lbf (610 N⋅m)	4-speed Ford 4R100 overdrive automatic	6,381
2002	Ford Triton V8	5.4 L (330 cu in) SOHC V8 (Eaton M112 supercharger)	380 hp (283 kW)	450 ft⋅lbf (610 N⋅m)	4-speed Ford 4R100 overdrive automatic	4,726
2003	Ford Triton V8	5.4 L (330 cu in) SOHC V8 (Eaton M112 supercharger)	380 hp (283 kW)	450 ft⋅lbf (610 N⋅m)	4-speed Ford 4R100 overdrive automatic	4,270
2004	Ford Triton V8	5.4 L (330 cu in) SOHC V8 (Eaton M112 supercharger)	380 hp (283 kW)	450 ft⋅lbf (610 N⋅m)	4-speed Ford 4R100 overdrive automatic	3,781
Total						28,124

=== Lincoln Blackwood (2002) ===
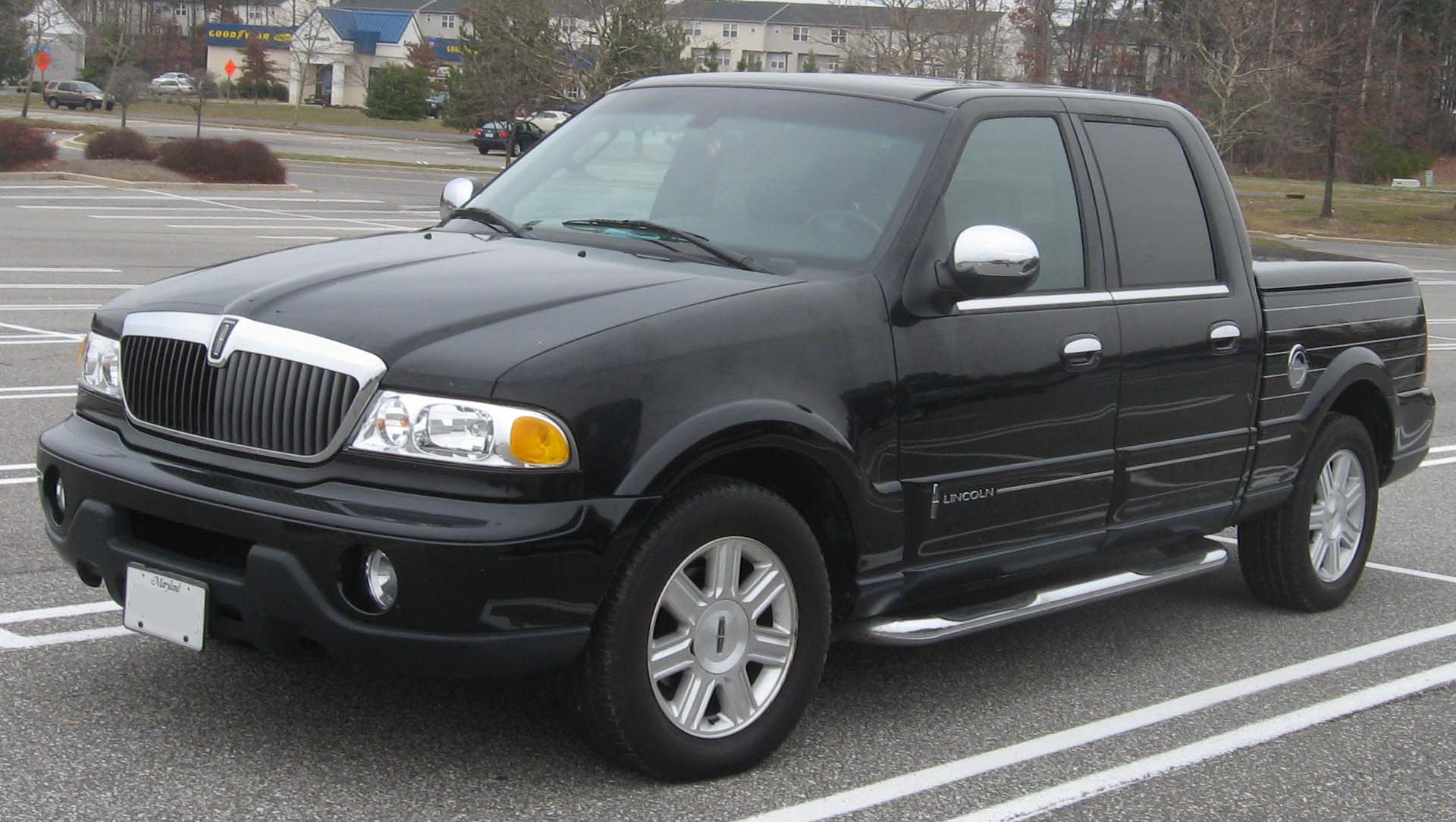
2002 Lincoln Blackwood

For 2002, the Lincoln-Mercury division of Ford introduced the Lincoln Blackwood, the first pickup truck ever sold by the Lincoln brand. Brought into production after a positive reception to a 1999 concept vehicle, the Blackwood was a variant of the Ford F-150 SuperCrew introduced for 2001.

Styled with the front fascia of the Lincoln Navigator SUV, the Blackwood diverged from the F-150 in terms of functionality. In place of a pickup bed, the Blackwood was given a stainless-steel cargo area lined with carpet covered with a power-operated tonneau; the plastic body panels of the pickup bed were styled as black wood with pinstripes. To match the simulated wood design of the pickup bed, Lincoln offered black as the only body color for the Blackwood. Sharing its interior with the Navigator, the Blackwood was fitted with four seats (with a center console between the rear seats).

Equipped only with rear-wheel drive, the Blackwood shared its 300 hp 5.4L 32-valve V8 with the Navigator.

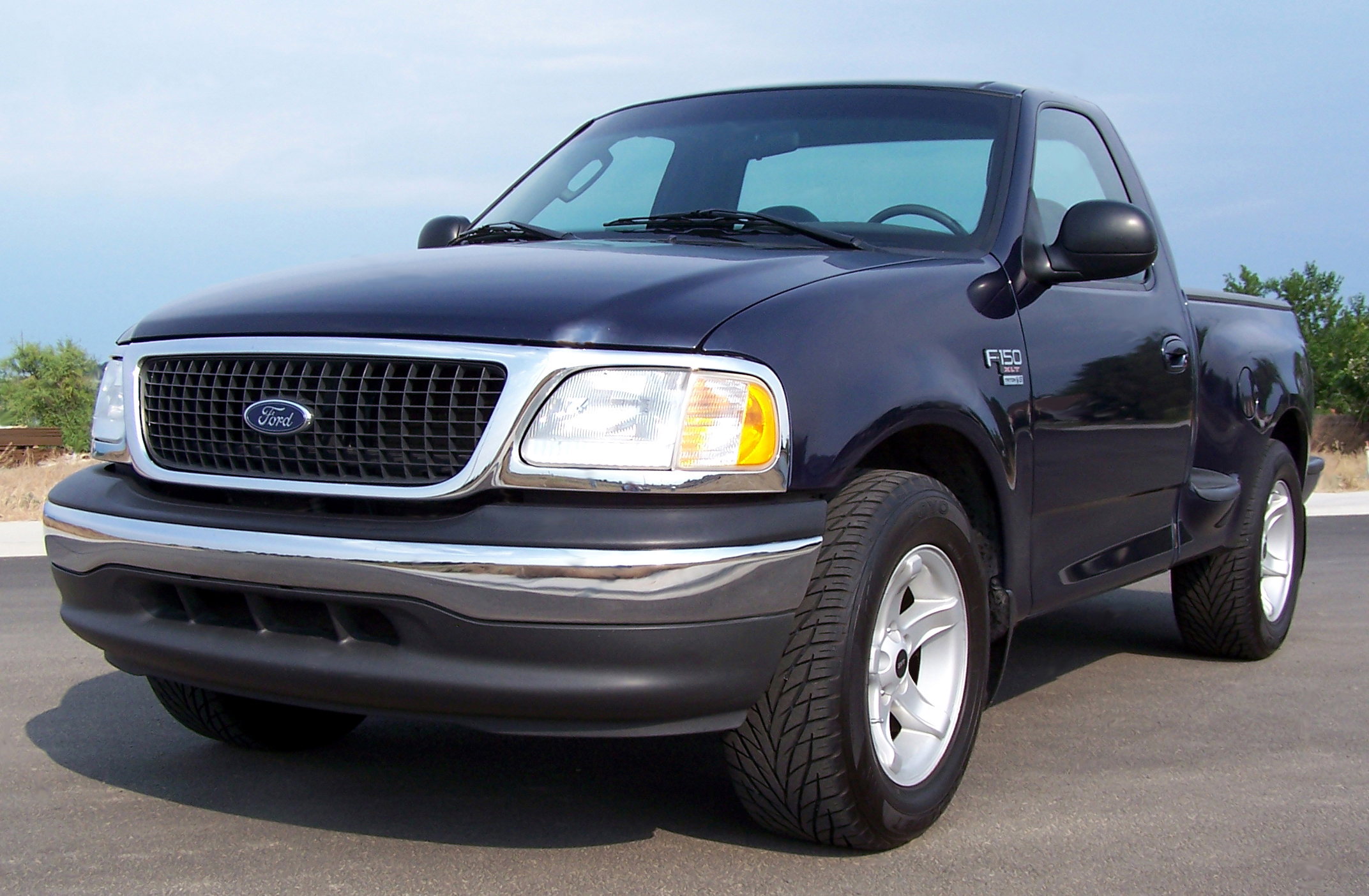
Ford F-150 Flareside

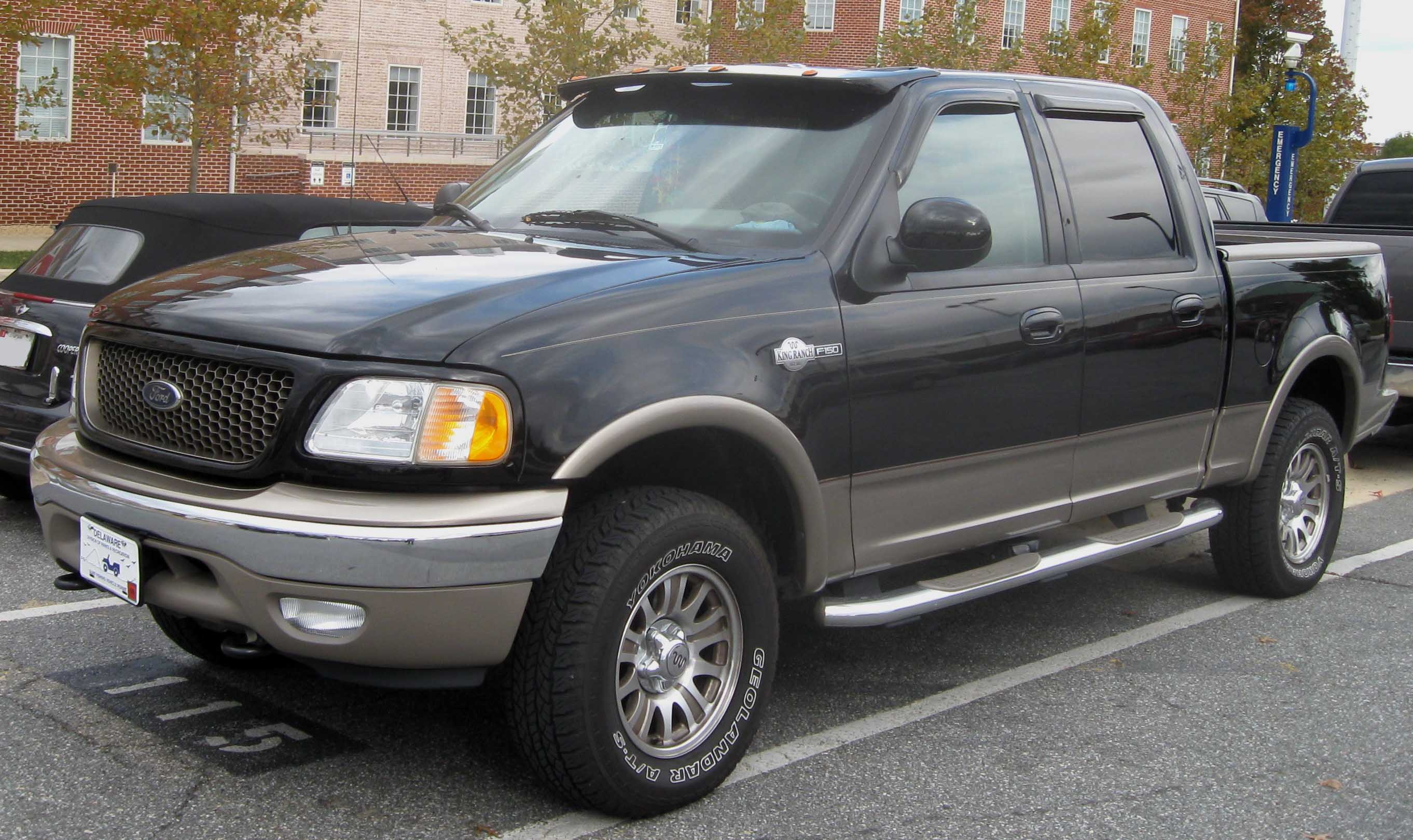
2001-2003 Ford F-150 King Ranch SuperCrew

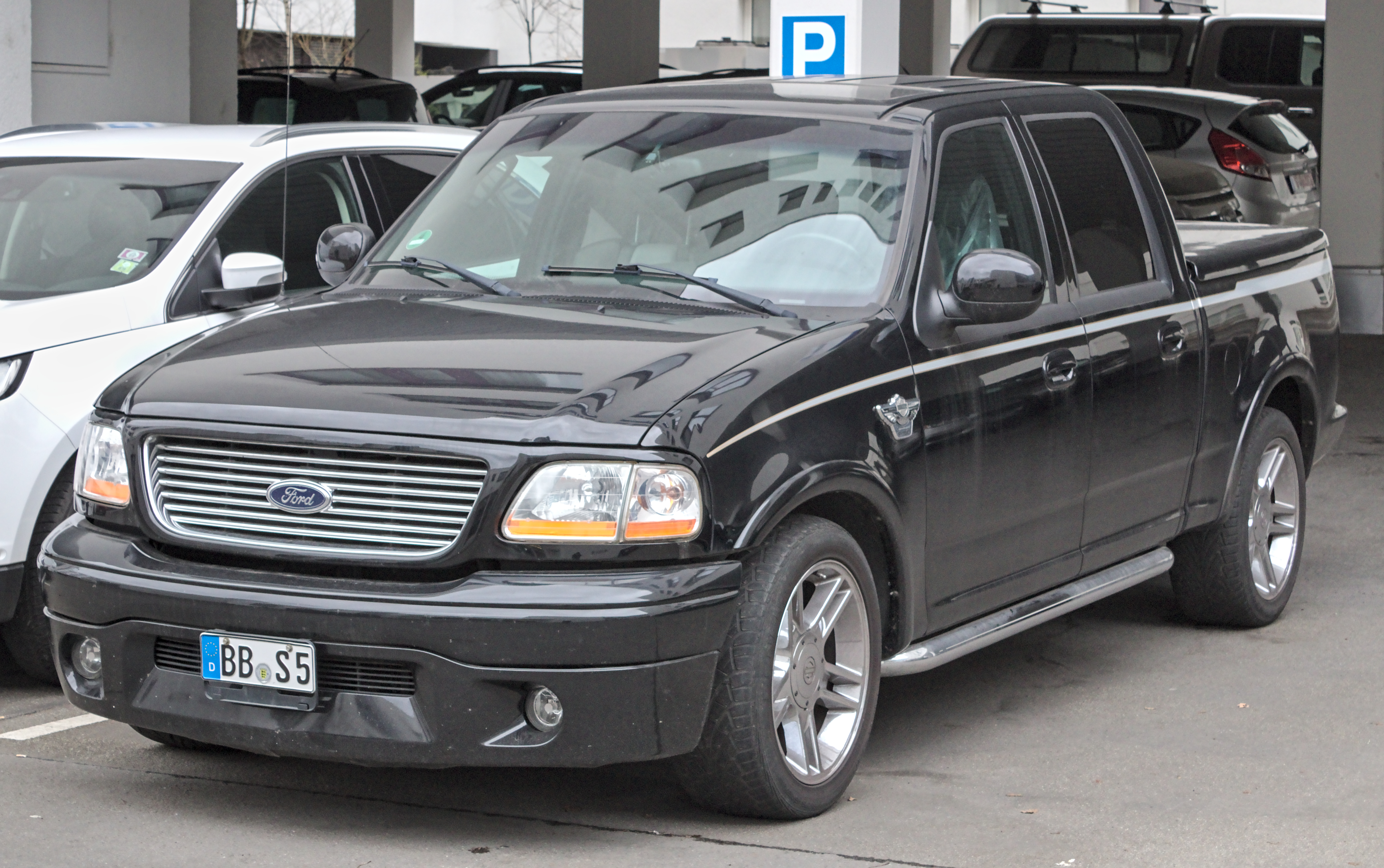
Ford F-150 Harley Davidson

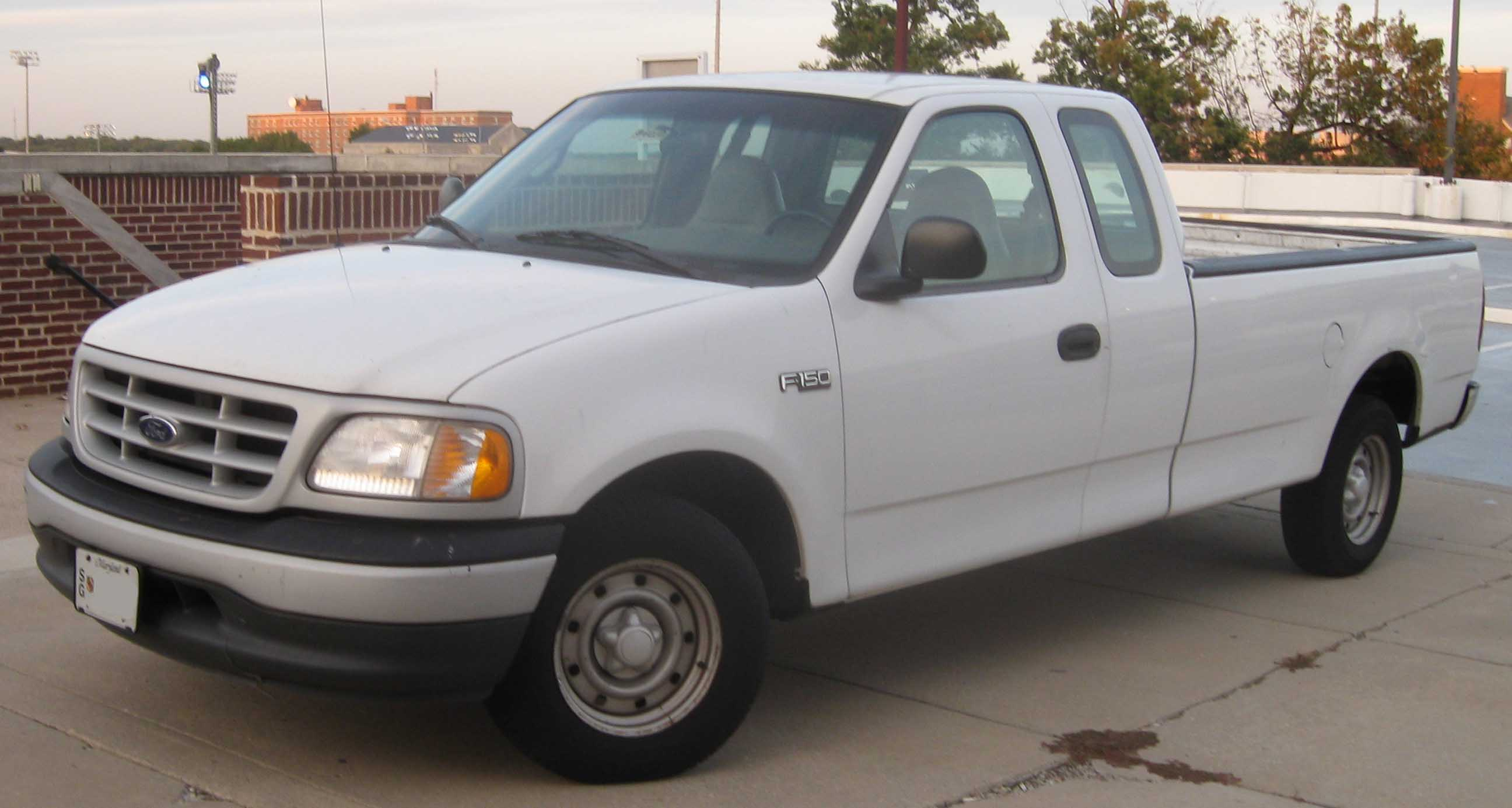
1999–2004 Ford F-150 SuperCab long bed

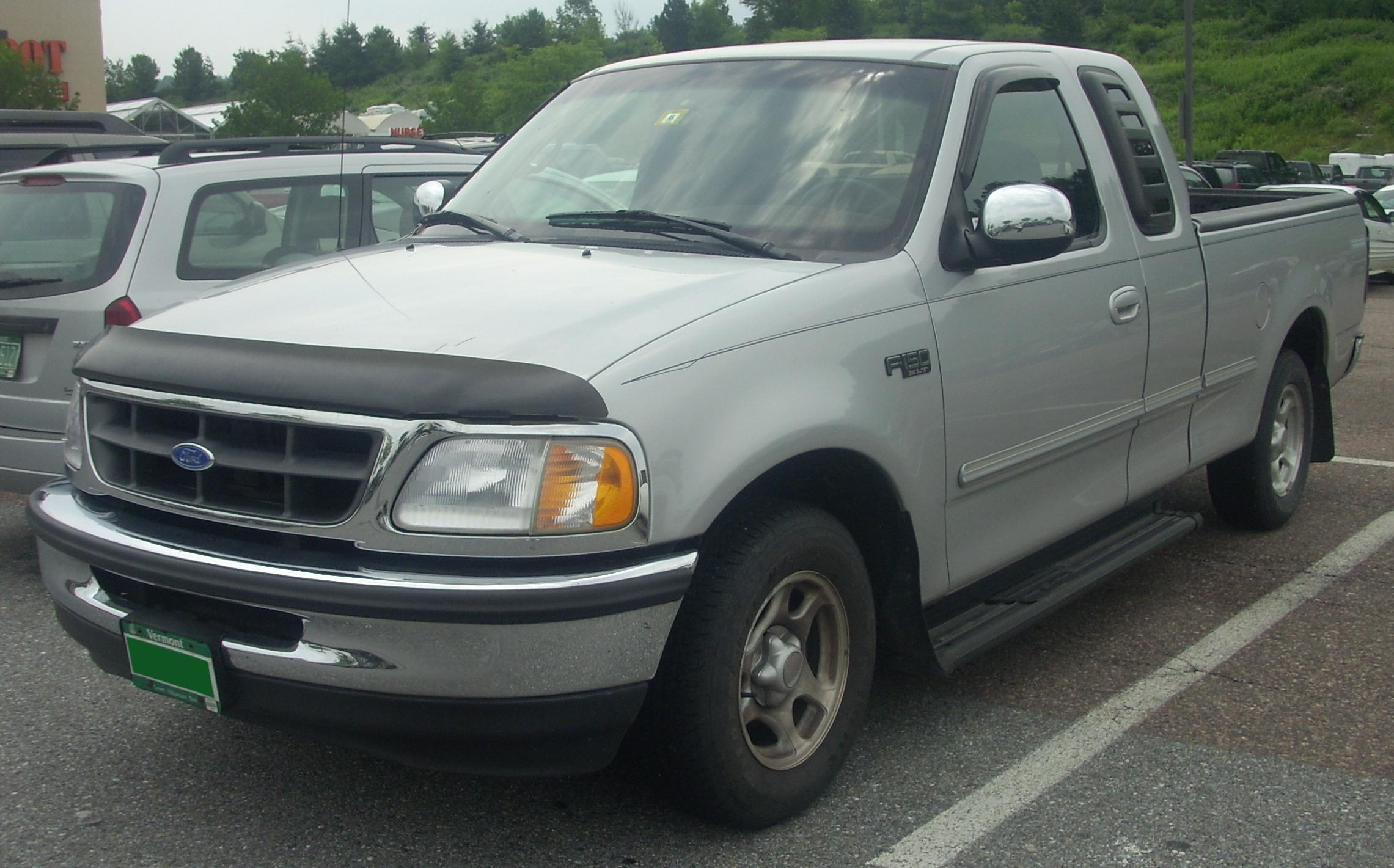
1997–1998 Ford F-150 SuperCab XLT

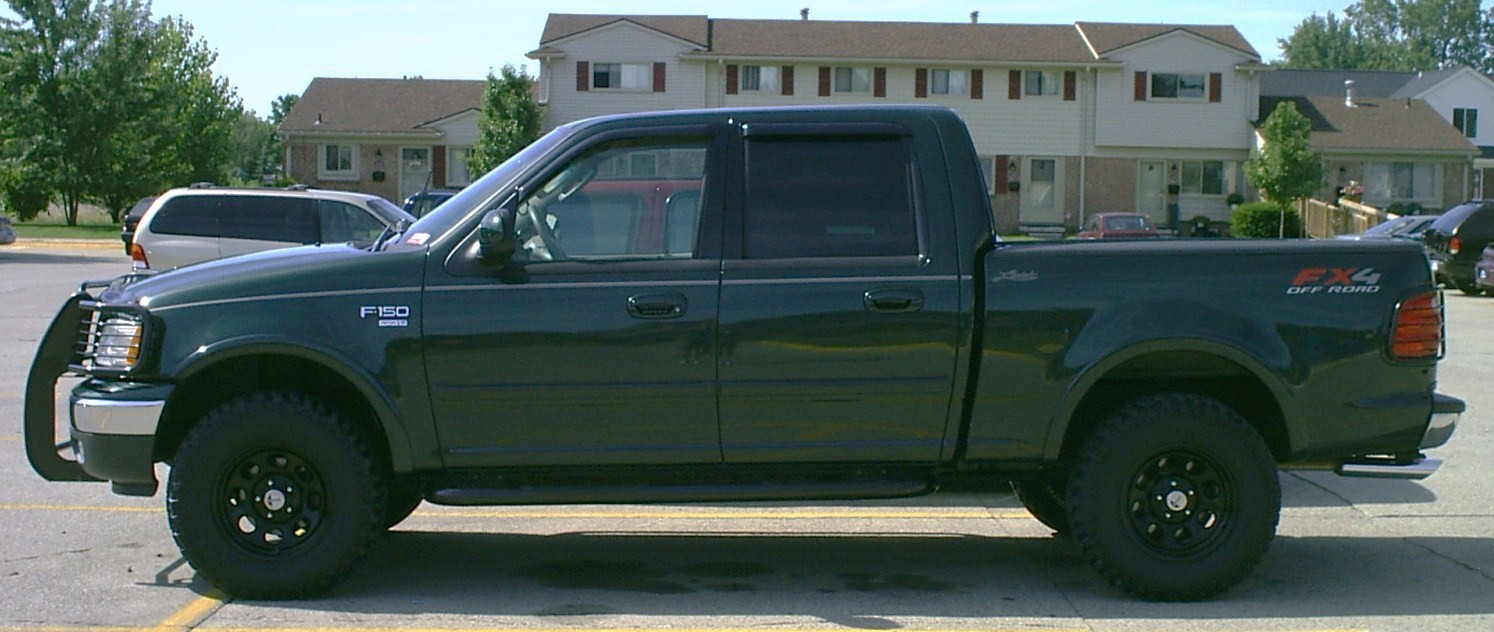
2003 F-150 FX4 SuperCrew (note "Lariat" badging)
