= Ontario Truck =

- Operated: 26 August 1965 - 2004
- Location: 1400 The Canadian Road; Oakville, Ontario, Canada
- Coordinates: 43.48°N 79.67°W
- Industry: Automotive, manufacturing
- Products: Pickup trucks
- Employees: 1,500 (2002)
- Volume: 3,009,281 square feet (279,571.4 m^{2})
- Owner: Ford Motor Company of Canada
- Defunct: July 1, 2004

Ontario Truck was a Ford Motor Company truck factory in Oakville, Ontario, Canada which occupied the same site as the current Oakville Assembly plant.

== Location ==
The Oakville Assembly and Ontario Truck site is a major landmark in Oakville. It is highly visible from the Queen Elizabeth Way due to the large "Ford" sign facing the highway, which occupies a large area on the side of the In-Line Vehicle Sequencing building. The site also has two large smokestacks, one for each paint shop, which are by far the tallest structures in the area.

== History ==
The truck assembly operation opened on August 26, 1965 and was closed in 2004; its last product was the 2004 F-150 Heritage. Prior to the closure and later retooling of the Ontario Truck plant, Ford constructed new body and paint buildings in 1996 and 1994 respectively. These buildings have now been incorporated into the flexible assembly line used for the production of the vehicles at Oakville Assembly.

The plant was the only plant to build the second generation F-150 Lightning SVT (1999-2004) and the limited edition 2000 Harley Davidson F-150.

== Closure ==
On January 11, 2002, it was announced that the Ontario Truck Plant would be closed by 2004, along with the Edison Assembly Plant in Edison, New Jersey, the St. Louis Assembly Plant in Hazelwood, Missouri, the Cleveland Aluminum Casting Plant in Brook Park, Ohio, and the Vulcan Forge Plant in Dearborn, Michigan, as part of a $4 billion restructure. It would eliminate 22,000 jobs in North America and a total of 35,000 around the world, and reduce annual production capacity from 5.7 million to 4.8 million vehicles. The plant had 1,500 workers at the time.

== Past Products ==
- 1965–2004 Ford F-Series
- 1999–2004 Ford SVT Lightning

== See also ==
- List of Ford factories
