= Sterling 10.5 axle =

Automotive axle

The Sterling 10.5 axle is an automotive axle manufactured by Ford Motor Company at the Sterling Axle Plant in Sterling Heights, MI. It was first used in model year 1985 Ford trucks. The axle was developed to replace the Dana 60 and Dana 70. The Sterling 10.5 axle is currently only made as a full floating axle.

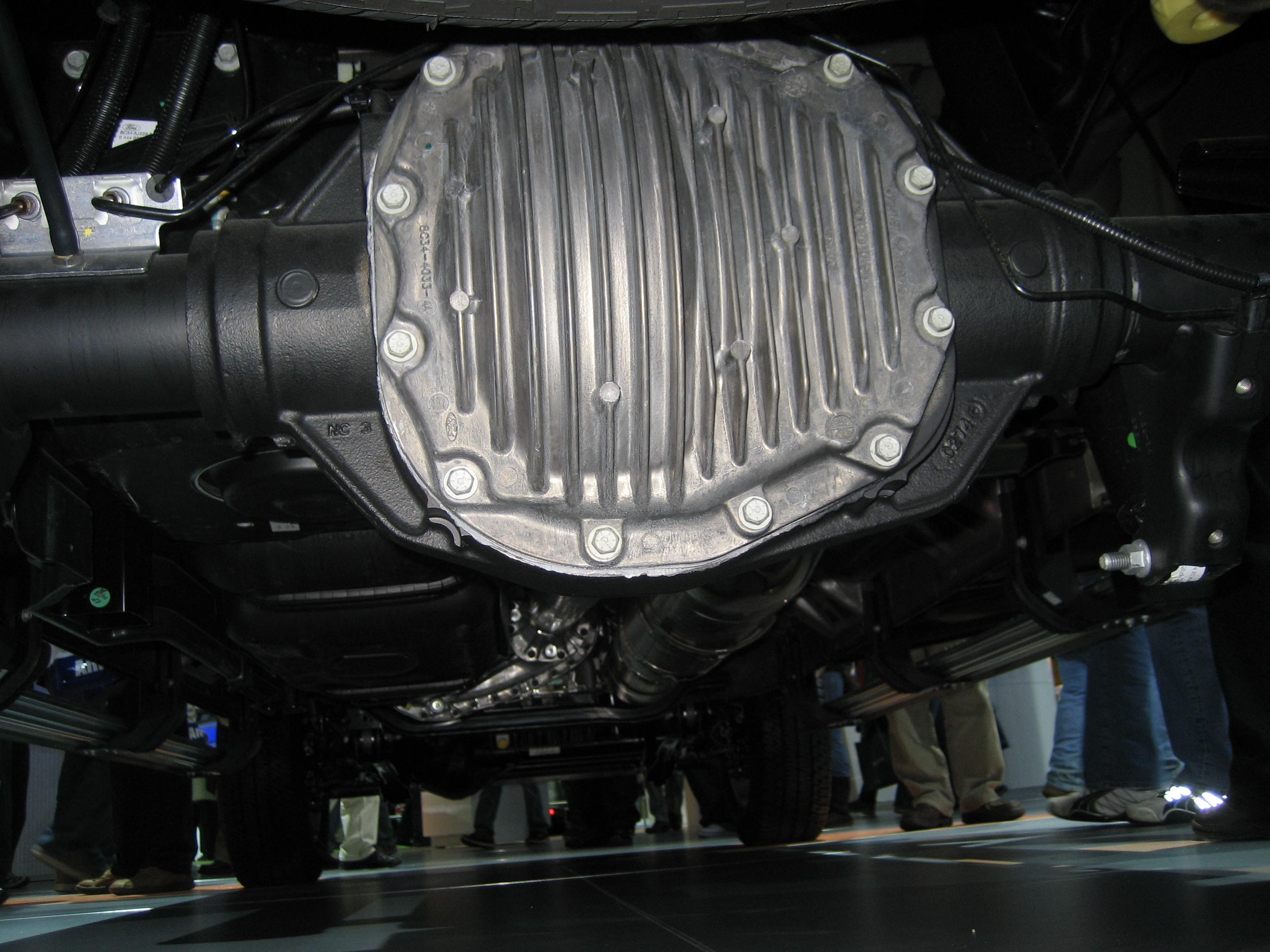
10.5 Sterling axle in 2011 Super Duty (without the electronic locking differential option)

== General Specifications ==
- Ring gear measures 10.5 inches (270 mm).
- 35 Spline axle shafts with a 1.5 in (38 mm) diameter
- Ratios 3.08 to 4.30. Current production ratios offered are 3.31, 3.55, 3.73, and 4.30.
- Since ca. 2005, the gears are formed by the face hob process, formerly face milled process.
- 2005 through 2012 have 13.38 in (340 mm) disk brakes, dual piston calipers and 8.1 in (210 mm) drum in hat parking brakes.
- 2013 have 14.29 in (363 mm) disk brakes, dual piston calipers and 9 in (230 mm) drum in hat parking brakes.

== 10.25 ==
Originally this axle was made as the Sterling 10.25, with a ring gear that measured 10.25 inches (260 mm) until it was upgraded in 1999 to the Sterling 10.50 for the Ford Super Duty trucks. The 10.25 axle came with drum brakes. There were two versions of the Sterling 10.25. The first version was produced from 1985 to 1992. The second version, produced from 1993 to 1997 featured a stronger pinion/yoke. This corrected a known, but rare, issue of the pinion yoke nut working loose. The first and second versions of the 10.25 axle are colloquially known as “short pinion-yoke” and “long pinion-yoke” respectively.

The 10.25 is still made. It appears the same as the 10.5 externally, except it uses a one piece differential case with 2 spider gears.

=== 10.25 Semi-float ===
The semi float variation is less common and was used in F-250 trucks with a lower GVWR (7200) all the way through 1996. The 10th generation Ford F-150 offered this axle in the light-duty F-250 trucks from 1997 to 1999. For model year 2000 - 2004 trucks, the F-150 7700 offered this axle and the F-250 light duty was discontinued. At least till 2011 the 12 bolt semi float was still found with the heavy duty f-150. Gear ratios were 3.73 in 4x4 and either the 3.73 or 4.10 in the two-wheel-drive models. This was available in both limited slip and standard variations. All 4x4 came with limited slip (L on tag), it can also be determined from the axle code on the door jamb vin label.

== 10.50 ==
In 1999 Ford revamped their heavy trucks, including their own Sterling axle. An upgraded 3 spider gear differential carrier was added. The differentials are interchangeable between the two variations. The new axle also came with disc brakes and a unique 8x170 mm (6.7 in) metric lug pattern. Options and features remained unchanged until model year 2011 trucks. 2011 models with this axle have the option of being equipped with an electronic locking differential.

== Common Applications ==
- Incomplete list. Common applications only.

Ford

- 1999-2016 F-250, F-350
- 2000-2006 Excursions (All)
