= Howard Simpson =

American engineer and inventor

Howard Woodworth Simpson (May 8, 1892 – November 4, 1963) was a pioneering American automotive engineer whose numerous groundbreaking inventions and designs have been extensively used by most automobile manufacturers across the globe in automatic transmissions.

== Biography ==
Howard Simpson was born on May 8, 1892 in Kalamazoo, Michigan, the son of John Robert Bruce Simpson, a carriage maker who was a superintendent for the Fisher Body Company. The Simpsons moved to Detroit in 1902. Simpson graduated from Detroit Central High School in 1910 and entered an apprenticeship program at Cadillac Motor Company. He attended the University of Michigan, graduating in 1917 with a bachelor of science degree in mechanical engineering.

Simpson volunteered for military service during World War I, but was rejected owing to poor eyesight. He served as a civilian employee in the U.S. Army Signal Corps, inspecting aircraft engines. After the war he went to work for the Henry Ford & Son Tractor Plant in Dearborn, Michigan, as a draftsman.

Simpson married Gertrude Haeger in 1918; they had two children, Bruce (b. 1921) and Charlotte (b. 1924).

In 1921 Henry Ford & Son was acquired by the Ford Motor Company. Simpson became a design engineer at Ford, working primarily on tractor designs and planetary gearsets. He often worked directly with Henry Ford himself.

Simpson left Ford in 1938. In 1948 he was diagnosed with cancer. Told he had less than six months to live, he moved to the American southwest (California and then Arizona). He spent much of his time drawing every arrangement he could conceive for planetary gearsets, filing patents on each. He was granted 23 patents in this field during his lifetime.

== The Simpson Gearset ==
Simpson's preferred gearset was for a three-speed automatic transmission using two identical planetary gearsets in series, linked by a common sun gear. The use of largely identical parts for the front and rear gearset made the transmission substantially cheaper to manufacture by reducing tooling costs. This three-speed gearing arrangement, patented in 1950, is commonly known as the "Simpson Gearset," although it is only one of numerous arrangements Simpson successfully patented during his life.

In the early 1950s Simpson attempted to sell his patent to major American automakers in Detroit, but was greeted with skepticism, despite his experience and positive reputation. Ford Motor Company licensed his three-speed gearset in 1953, although they did not put it into production at that time. In 1955 Chrysler Corporation licensed the same gearset for use in their new three-speed Torqueflite automatic, which went into production in mid-1956. General Motors was reluctant to adopt this gearset, but eventually relented and licensed it for the Turbo Hydramatic, which entered production for the 1964 model year. Ford similarly introduced reengineered Cruise-O-Matic transmissions (C3, C4, and C6) using the gearset they had already licensed. The Simpson-geared Cruise-O-Matics were introduced in the 1964 and 1965 model years. Mercedes-Benz licensed a variant – featuring cross-coupled ring gears and carriers instead of coupled sun gears and only one coupled ring gear and carrier – for its 2nd automatic transmission generation with four speeds, which was launched in 1964 for the 600 and was gradually introduced with slightly different ratios in all passenger cars from 1967 onwards. The 2nd automatic transmission generation variant with three speeds (1971–1980) was not based on a Simpson gearset design, but on the Detroit Gear.

== Death and legacy ==
Simpson died of cancer in November 1963. During his lifetime he was granted a total of 41 patents, which eventually resulted in millions of dollars of royalty payments to him and his estate.

In 2007 the Timken Company and the SAE Transmission and Driveline Committee established the annual SAE/Timken-Howard Simpson Automotive Transmission and Driveline Innovation Award for innovations in automotive transmissions and drivelines.

In 1964 an uncredited writer for Motor Trend magazine said of Simpson, "[h]e was neither eccentric nor egocentric. An excellent engineer, he was usually calm and humble, always able to see merit in the other fellow's idea."

== Sources ==
- "Man with a Pencil: Engineering Genius of the Modern Automatic Transmission," Motor Trend, Vol. 16, No. 10, Oct. 1964, pp. 82–85.
- Ford R. Bryan, Henry's Lieutenants (Chicago: IL: Wayne State University Press: 1993), ISBN 0-8143-2428-2.
