= Lincoln Blackwood =

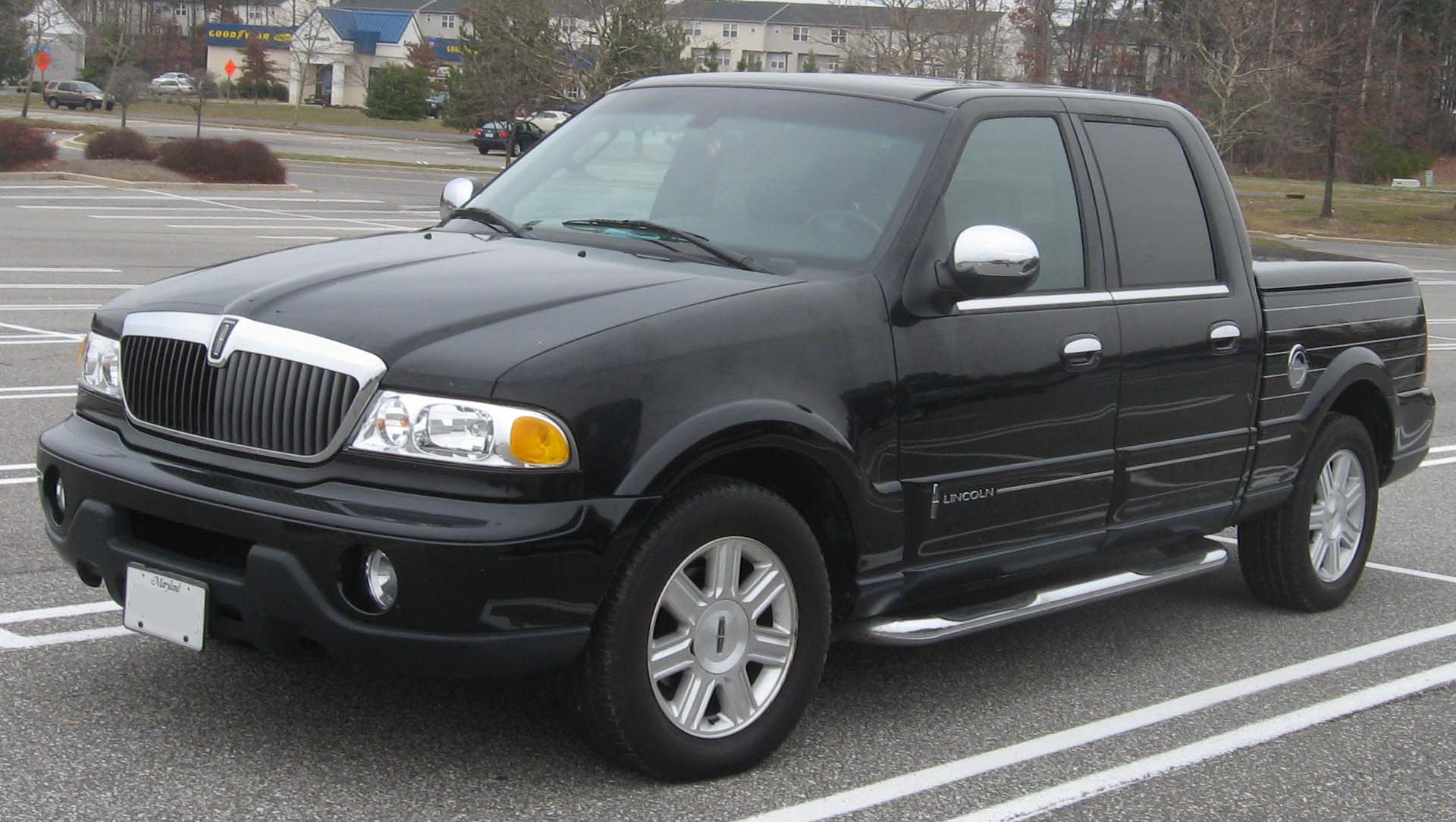
- 2002 Lincoln Blackwood

Overview
- Manufacturer: Lincoln (Ford)
- Production: September 25th 2000 – August 8th, 2002
- Model years: 2002 (United States); 2002–2003 (Mexico)
- Assembly: United States: Claycomo, Missouri (Kansas City Assembly)
- Designer: Patrick Schiavone

Body and chassis
- Class: luxury full-size pickup truck
- Body style: 4-door crew cab
- Layout: FR layout
- Platform: Ford P platform
- Related: Ford F-Series (tenth generation); Lincoln Navigator

Powertrain
- Engine: 5.4L InTech DOHC V8
- Transmission: 4-speed automatic

Dimensions
- Wheelbase: 138.5 in (3,518 mm)
- Length: 220.2 in (5,593 mm)
- Width: 78.0 in (1,981 mm)
- Height: 73.6 in (1,869 mm)

Chronology
- Successor: Lincoln Mark LT

The Lincoln Blackwood is a luxury full-size pickup truck that was marketed by the Lincoln division of Ford Motor Company for the 2002 model year. The first pickup truck marketed by Lincoln, the Blackwood was derived from the Ford F-150 SuperCrew and the Lincoln Navigator. Drawing its name from its simulated black woodgrain cargo box, the Blackwood was offered solely with a black-painted exterior.

Although the concept vehicle had a positive public reception, the production Blackwood fell far under sales projections in the United States and Mexico. After the 2002 model year, the Blackwood was discontinued in the United States, with a short run of 2003 models produced for Mexico. In total, only 3,383 units were produced, making it both the rarest and shortest-produced Lincoln model line.

For 2006, Lincoln entered the pickup truck segment for a second time with the Lincoln Mark LT — again based on the Ford F-150. The Mark LT abandoned many of the model-unique features of the Blackwood in favor of providing the functionality of a pickup truck and proved more successful as sales nearly matched the Escalade EXT.

The first Lincoln vehicle manufactured exclusively outside of the state of Michigan since 1958, the Blackwood was assembled by Ford at its Kansas City Assembly facility in Claycomo, Missouri, alongside the F-150 from September 2000 to August 2002.

== Background ==
The 1998 launch of the Lincoln Navigator was met with success; along with becoming the second best-selling Lincoln (behind the Town Car), the Navigator contributed to Lincoln overtaking Cadillac in sales for the first time. To build on its success in the light-truck segment, a Lincoln Blackwood concept vehicle was introduced at the 1999 North American International Auto Show; it was also displayed at the 1999 LA Auto Show. The concept Blackwood received nearly universal approval from the public.

Named the "ultimate utility vehicle" by Ford, the Blackwood was intended to combine the utility of a truck-based vehicle (such as the Navigator or an F-150) with the comfort of a sedan (such as the Town Car), replacing the F-Series pickup bed with an enclosed cargo area bodied with black African wenge wood (adopting a styling element of wood-bodied station wagons). To protect the wood from the elements, it was sealed with epoxy and inlaid with aluminum stripes.

=== Production development ===
Met with nearly universal approval by the public, the Blackwood concept vehicle was approved for production shortly after its display; it was also displayed by Ford at the 1999 Frankfurt Auto Show (a rare appearance of Lincoln vehicles in Europe).

Following its approval for production, the Lincoln Blackwood saw almost no changes made from the 1999 concept vehicle. For a lower ride height and larger tire sidewall, the 19-inch wheels were downsized to 18 inches. To produce the cargo bed at a realistic cost, the 20 square feet (2 m^{2}) of expensive wood was replaced by screened laminate composite panels (the inlaid aluminum strakes remained).

Intended to enter production in early 2001, sales of the Blackwood were delayed several months by supply problems related to the cargo box (produced by Magna Steyr). At the end of 2001, Ford froze their contracts with parent company Magna International in response to the issue, producing only 451 units for the entire 2001 calendar year.

At the time of its launch, Lincoln was unsure of how many examples of the Blackwood would be produced. Intending to limit yearly production (to maintain exclusivity), Lincoln did plan to sell at least 18,000 vehicles over multiple years. Production began with early units on September 25, 2000 with production ending on August 8th, 2002. The highest number built in a single month was 718 in May of 2002.

== Model overview ==
=== Chassis ===
The Lincoln Blackwood used the chassis of the tenth-generation F-Series (introduced by the 1997 F-150), using a 138.5-inch (3,520 mm) wheelbase. The Blackwood shared its front short-long control arm independent front suspension with the F-150; while retaining the solid rear axle, the rear suspension was also fitted with air springs (closer in line with the Lincoln Town Car).

In contrast to the Lincoln Navigator, all Blackwoods were manufactured with rear-wheel drive (to maintain a lower ride height). The model line had a 1,200-pound (540 kg) payload with an 8,700-pound (3,900 kg) towing capacity.

==== Powertrain details ====
Shared with the Navigator, the Blackwood is fitted with a 5.4 L V8, producing 300 hp (220 kW). In place of the SOHC 16-valve Triton V8 used by the F-150, the Blackwood used the DOHC 32-valve InTech V8 used by Lincoln; the engine was paired to a 4-speed automatic transmission.

Years	Engine	Power	Torque
2002	5.4 L InTech DOHC V8	300 hp (223.7 kW; 304.2 PS)	355 ft⋅lbf (481 N⋅m)

=== Body design ===
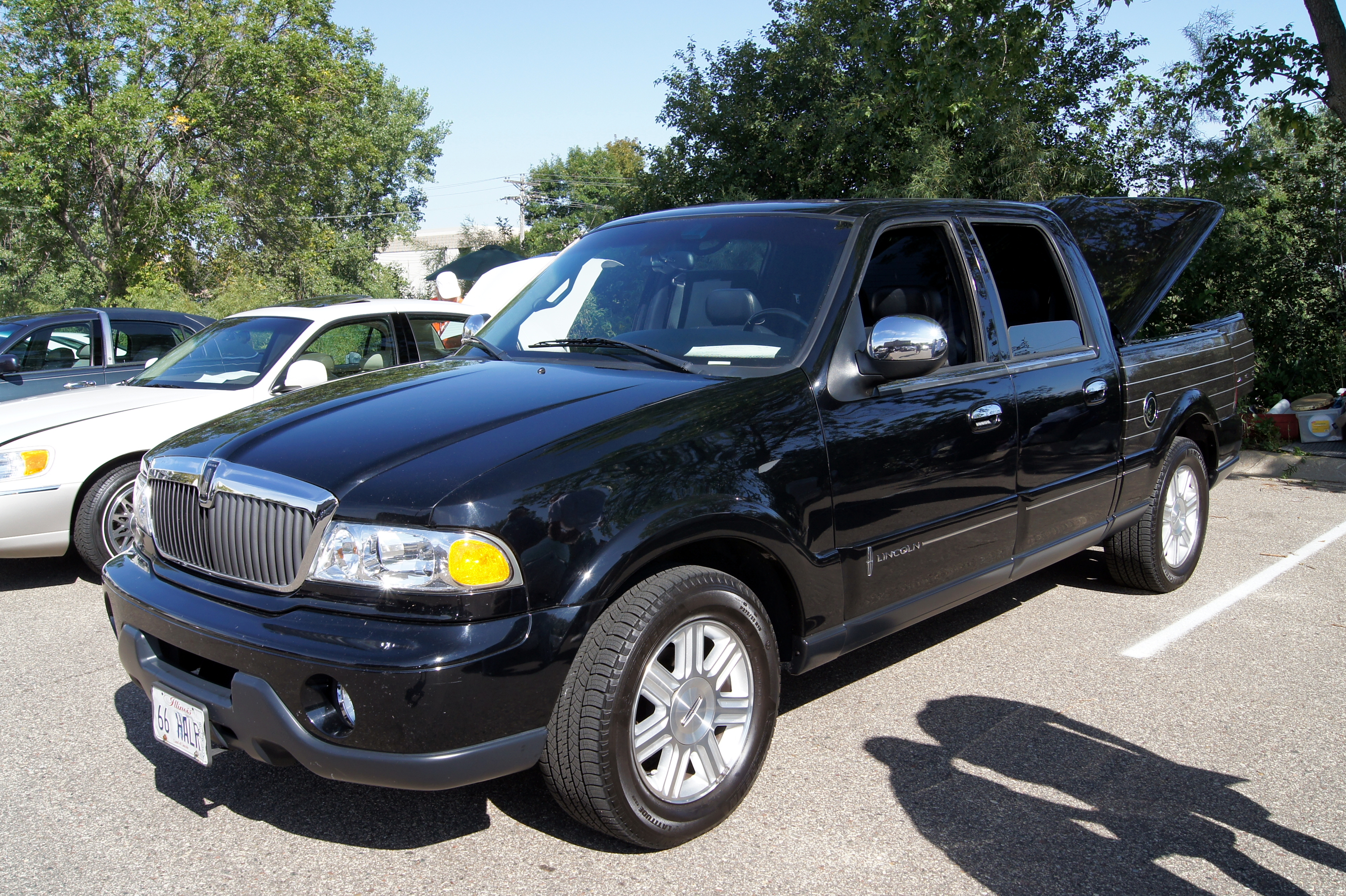
2002 Lincoln Blackwood

==== Exterior ====
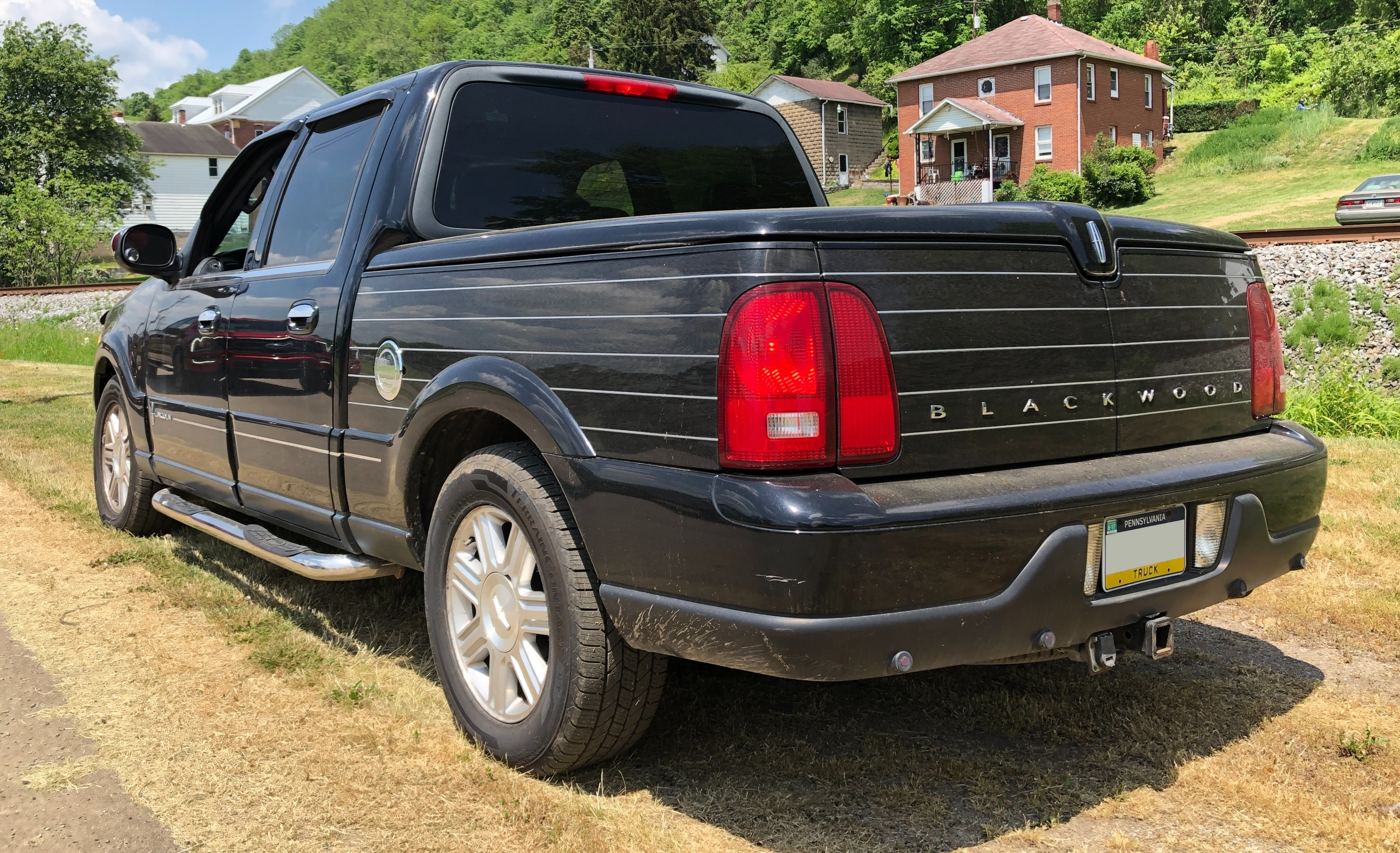
Lincoln Blackwood, rear cargo doors closed

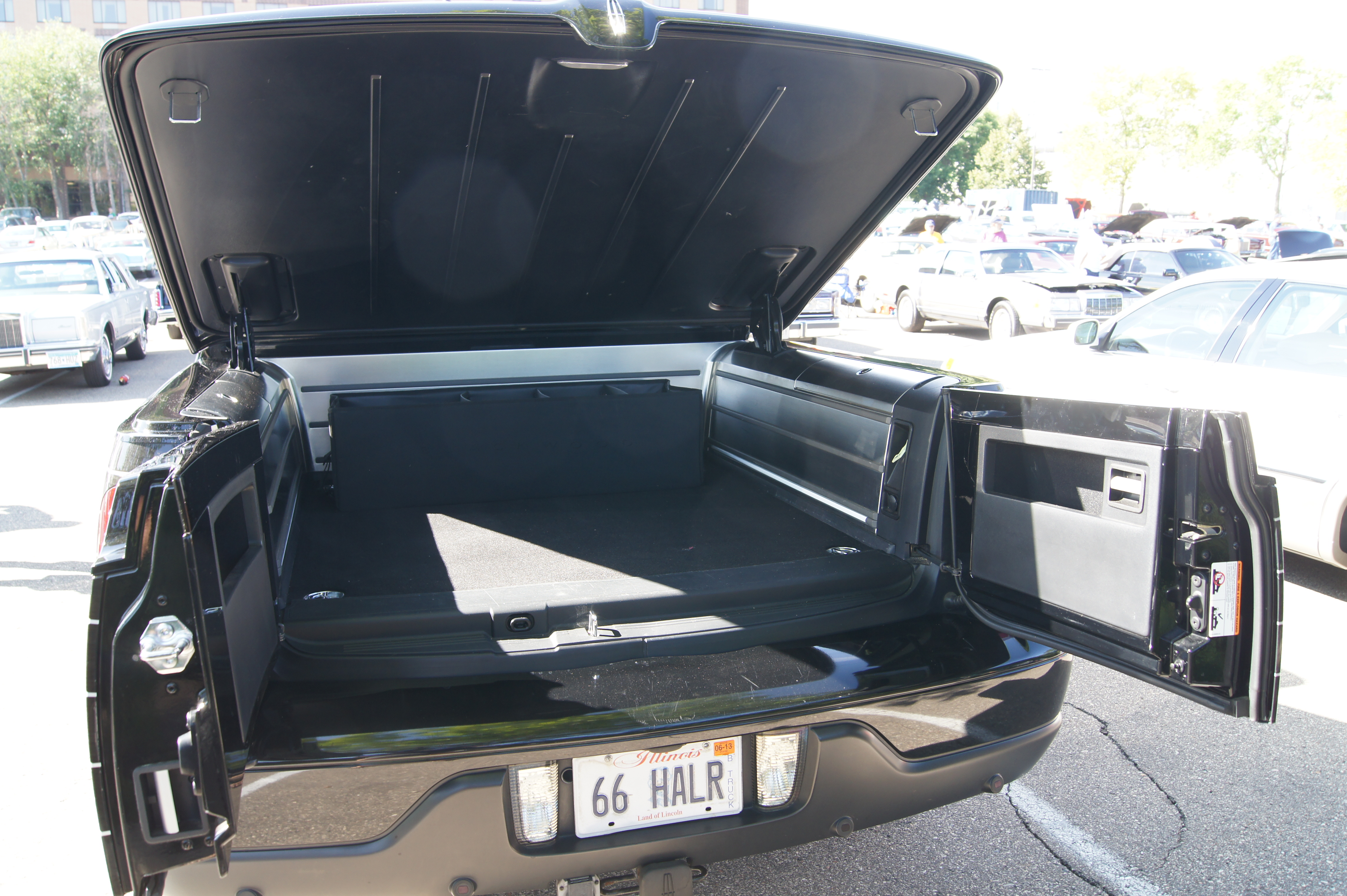
Lincoln Blackwood, cargo area doors open

Sharing its cab with the Ford F-150 SuperCrew, the Blackwood sourced its front bodywork directly from the Navigator. In contrast to its Ford counterpart, the 4-foot-8-inch (1.42 m) cargo bed of the Blackwood was constructed of plastic composites. In its namesake design feature, the exterior of the cargo bed was styled with imitation black African wengewood with aluminum-strake inlays (making it the first "woodie" Ford Motor Company vehicle since the LTD Country Squire and Colony Park station wagons, discontinued in 1991).

In another major design change, the rear cargo bed was repurposed as a watertight trunk, adopting a permanently mounted tonneau cover (power-operated), opening above a 50/50 hinged door (replacing a tailgate). The interior of the Blackwood cargo area was fully carpeted, lined in polished aluminum, and lit with LED lighting. While far smaller in interior size than a similar-length F-150 cargo bed, at 26 cubic feet (740 dm^{3}), the cargo area of the Blackwood was larger than the trunk of the Lincoln Town Car (itself, the highest-capacity sedan produced at the time).

==== Interior ====
Sourced almost directly from the first-generation Lincoln Navigator, the interior of the Blackwood shared its dashboard primarily with the F-150 (as does the Expedition and Navigator), using imitation black oak wood for interior trim. The model line used a four-seat 2+2 seating configuration (effectively the front two rows of the Navigator interior), placing a large center console between the two rear seats. All four seats were upholstered in Connolly leather, with heating and cooling for the front seats.

=== Trim ===
In line with the first-generation Navigator, Lincoln offered the Blackwood under a single trim level. The model line was equipped with nearly every available Lincoln feature standard, including a sunroof, premium sound system (cassette player in dashboard with CD changer in front console), and multi-zone automatic climate control.

Only one option was offered for the Blackwood: a vehicle telematics system, which added a voice-activated cellular phone and a GPS navigation system (mounted on a 5-inch front-console screen). Of the 3,383 units produced, 2,122 (62.73%) came equipped with the navigation system, while the remaining 1,261 (37.27%) went without. Along with standard dual front airbags, the Blackwood was fitted with standard front side airbags.

==== Neiman Marcus Edition ====
For the 2001 Neiman Marcus spring catalog, Lincoln built a special edition of 50 Neiman Marcus Edition Blackwoods. While sharing the same exterior as a standard Blackwood, several upgrades were made to the interior, including Neiman Marcus logo-embroidered headrests and a modified rear console, including a 7-inch widescreen LCD Panasonic DVD player with wireless headphones; the console also received a cooler/warmer compartment.

While priced at $58,800 ($6,300 higher than a regular Blackwood), the Neiman Marcus Edition Blackwood sold out within less than 24 hours of its release.

== Reception ==
The Blackwood was a major commercial failure, withdrawn from the market in a year; selling off the remaining inventory took two more years. Reviewers wrote about its lack of utility and off-road capability. Naming the Blackwood one of "The 20 Dumbest Cars of All Time", Autoblog stated, "Ford CEO Jacques Nasser and his luxury brand chief Wolfgang Reitzle thought it was a great idea: a luxury Lincoln-branded pickup truck with a trunk instead of a flat bed and pinstripe painting to mimic a business suit. [The Blackwood was] one of those vanity projects hatched at the top." Car and Driver named it one of the worst flops of the past 25 years, saying, "Check out the cargo box: It's lined in carpet and gen-yoo-wine stainless steel. That's stainless—means it can't be stained. You can't carry nuthin' heavy or dirty in it without uglying it up, but it makes for a nice trunk, see?" Jalopnik included the Blackwood on its list of "Ten Cars That Should Have Never Left the Factory", saying "Riding the cheap upgrade, big margin wave of the Navigator, Ford gave its F-150 the same treatment, calling it the Blackwood. Except they stripped out every ounce of actual utility from the vehicle, save for towing, by making it a RWD-only pickup with an aluminum lined, carpeted, power tonneau'd bed. This was where they decided to pour their resources rather than refining their new RWD LS sedan. This is a symbol of the fall of the brand. Now we're stuck with a lifeless shell of a company, making badge engineered Fords that bastardize the Mark (MK?) name."

Although the Blackwood's RWD-only configuration limited off-road utility, air suspension and a Crown Victoria cop-car steering rack gave good handling and a ride that was more akin to a car than a truck. Despite its lack of success, the Blackwood "did foreshadow the changes that were to come in the pickup truck market. Trucks with luxury amenities have become much more popular, and many high-line trucks now resemble luxury cars in the cabin. The Blackwood was a truck ahead of its time."

Introduced alongside the Blackwood for 2002, the Cadillac Escalade EXT outsold the model line by more than four to one. While also sold as a crew-cab pickup truck from an American luxury brand, the Escalade EXT was available with multiple utility features favored by buyers, including optional four-wheel drive, an open-roof cargo area, and multiple colors. Based on the Chevrolet Avalanche, the Escalade EXT had a reconfigurable interior with five-passenger seating.

After the 2002 model year, Lincoln ended sales of the Blackwood in the United States, with all 2003 production of the model line sold in Mexico; the final Lincoln Blackwood rolled off the assembly line in December 2002, 15 months after its entry into production.

== Epilogue ==
For 2006, Lincoln re-entered the pickup truck segment with the Lincoln Mark LT. Again, based on the Ford F-150, the Mark LT abandoned many of the model-unique features of the Blackwood in favor of providing the functionality of a pickup truck. While massively outsold by its Ford counterpart, the Mark LT proved more successful than its predecessor, nearly matching the Escalade EXT in sales.

After the 2008 model year, Ford ended sales of the Mark LT in the United States, effectively replaced by the Platinum and Limited trims, added to both the F-150 and Super Duty versions of the F-Series. While Cadillac ended sales of the Escalade EXT pickup after 2013, GM continued production of luxury-oriented pickups through its GMC "Denali" sub-brand. In 2018, the Ford F-450 Super Duty Limited became the first factory-produced pickup truck with a price of over $100,000, and pickups with a price tag over $100,000 have become more common since, especially following the 2021–2023 inflation.
