= Patrick Schiavone =

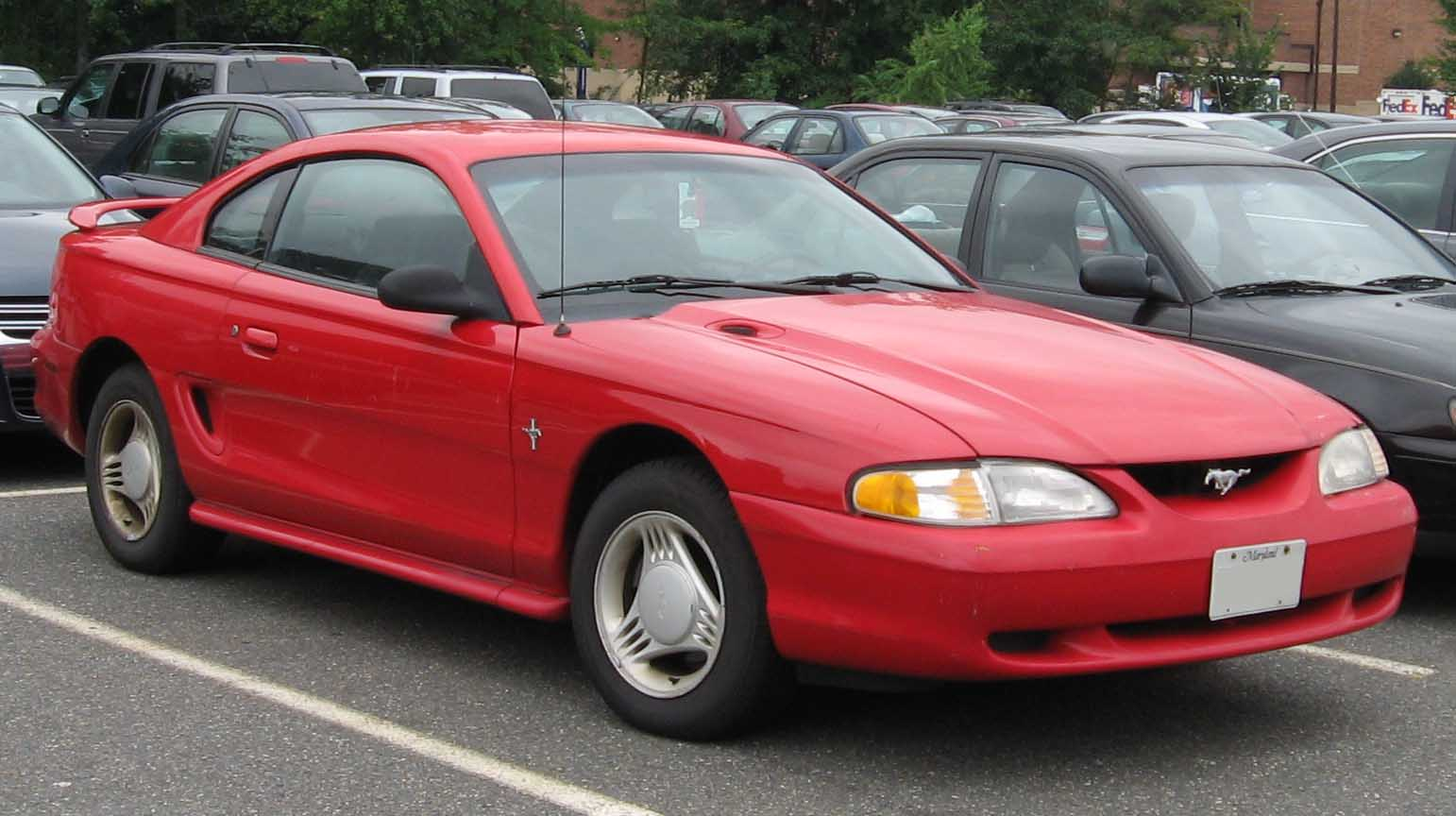
1994-98 Ford Mustang

Patrick Schiavone is Global Vice President of Design, for Whirlpool Corporation. He has been an automobile designer who is best known for his work on the 1994 Ford Mustang.

== Education ==
He is a graduate of College for Creative Studies, Detroit.

== Time at Ford ==
At Ford Motor Company, he oversaw their North American car designs, which meant he was in charge of designing trucks, SUVs, and CUVs. His most notable design was the 1994 Ford Mustang, a refresh that is said to have saved the "pony car" from extinction. Schiavone is credited with the design of the eleventh-generation Ford F-150, the best-selling truck in the world. He also directed the design of the Ford Expedition and the Lincoln Navigator. Schiavone also designed the Ford Focus and Ford Contour.
