= Ford Atlas =

Concept pickup truck designed by Ford

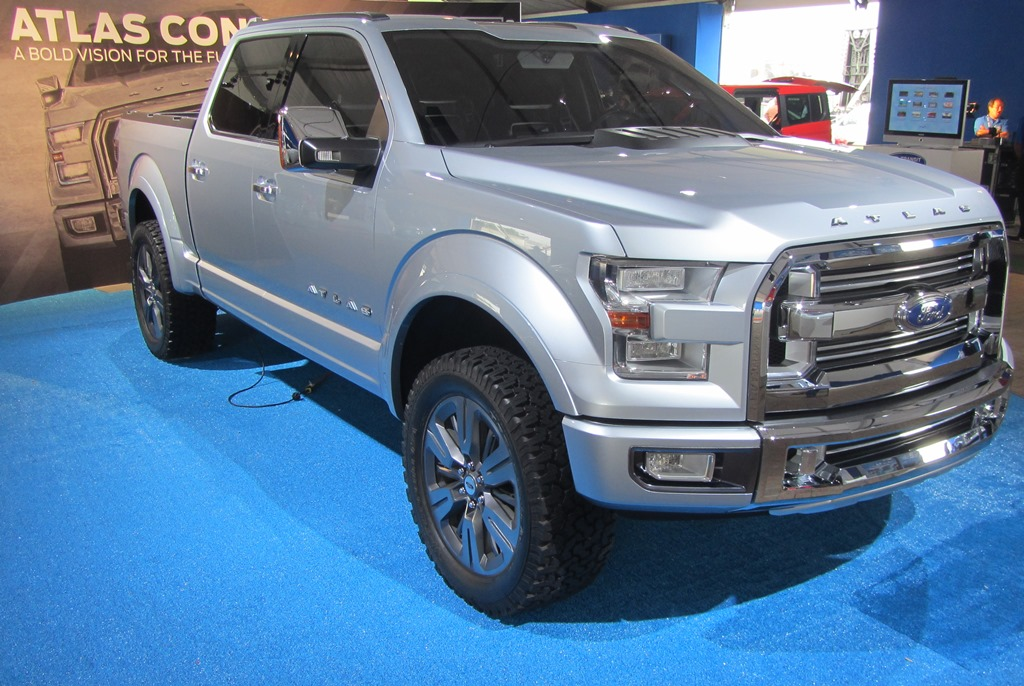

Overview
- Manufacturer: Ford
- Also called: Ford F-150 Atlas
- Model years: 2013

Body and chassis
- Class: Concept pickup truck
- Layout: Front engine, rear-wheel drive / four-wheel drive
- Related: Ford F-Series (thirteenth generation)

Powertrain
- Engine: 3.5 L EcoBoost V6
- Transmission: 6-speed 6R80 automatic

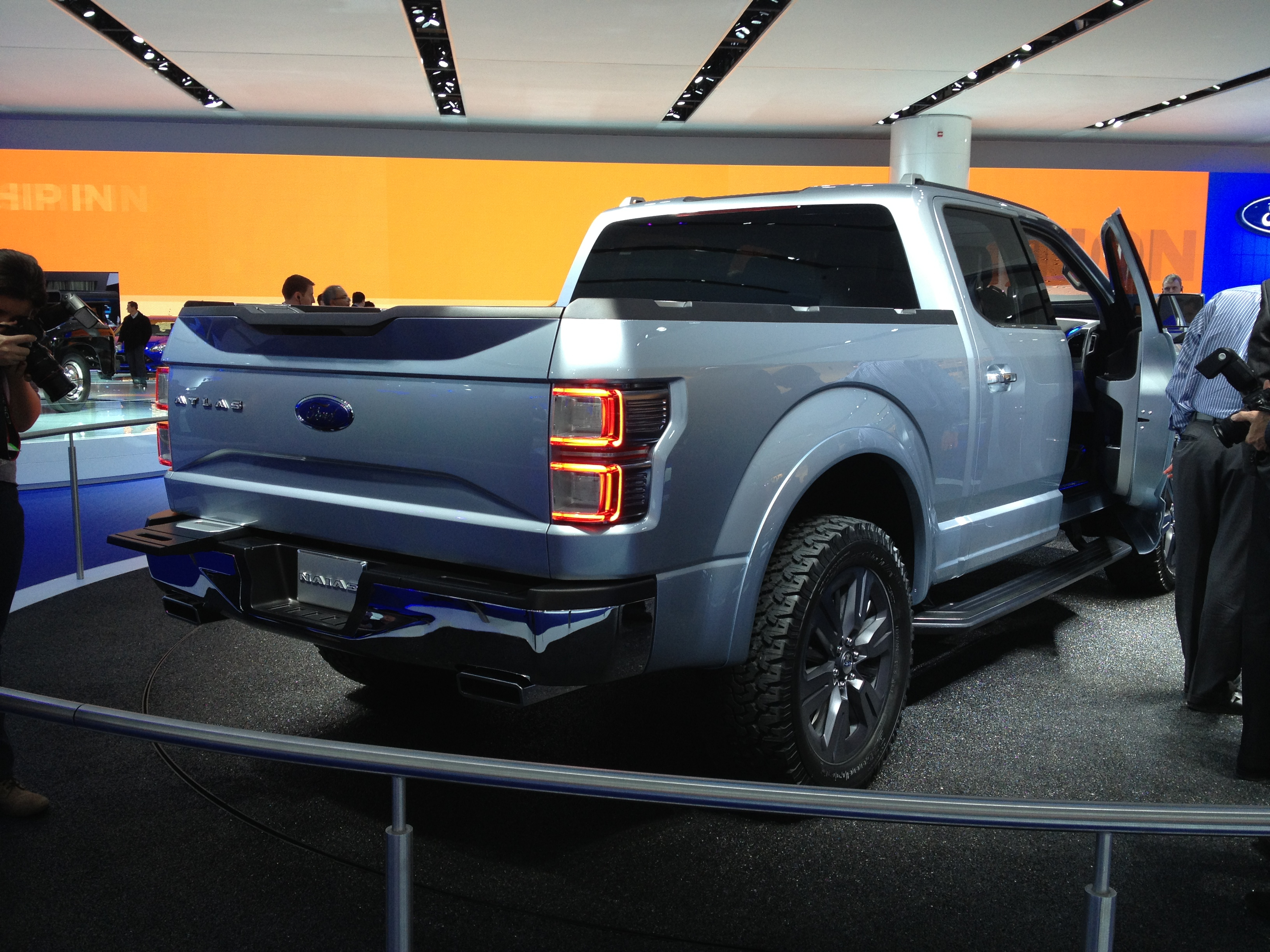
Rear ¾ view

The Ford Atlas was a concept pickup truck designed by Ford. Debuted at the 2013 North American International Auto Show, the Atlas was developed as a close preview of the 2015 F-150 (particularly a mix between the Platinum and Limited (the latter's 2016 return) trims).

Along with showcasing the transition of the model line to aluminum-intensive construction, the concept vehicle also included additional features to further enhance fuel economy. Sized similarly to the existing F-150 SuperCrew, the aluminum construction of the Atlas saved approximately 700 pounds over its steel-bodied counterpart (no official curb weight for the Atlas was given).

In addition to design elements developed to enhance fuel economy (including unprecedented active wheel shutters), the Atlas was also designed with enhanced capability and ease of use.

== Overview ==
=== Chassis ===
Alongside the introduction of aluminum-intensive construction for the production F-Series, the Atlas debuted the second generation of the Ford 3.5L twin-turbocharged EcoBoost V6 engine. While unchanged in displacement or in the use of turbocharging, the updated engine was primarily distinguished by the introduction of start-stop capability to reduce idling.

=== Exterior ===
Styled as a sharper-edged evolution of the Ford F-Series thirteenth generation, the Atlas was fitted with quad LED headlamps and taillamps. Alongside active grille and bumper air dam aerodynamics, the tailgate was fitted with a decklid spoiler. Introducing a redesign of a rear tailgate step, the cargo bed of the Atlas also included a set of hidden cargo ramps for wheeling items into the bed.

=== Interior ===
Configured with a 5-passenger interior, the Atlas was fitted with leather seats. To improve driving in small spaces, the Atlas was fitted with a 360-degree camera, giving a "birds' eye view" of the vehicle. As a truck version of its Active Park Assist parking feature, the Atlas debuted Trailer Backup Assist, allowing drivers to back up a trailer with the turn of a knob; Dynamic Hitch Assist uses the backup camera to line up the trailer hitch to a trailer.
