= Ford F-Series (twelfth generation) =

Twelfth generation of the Ford F-Series pickup trucks

Twelfth generation Ford F-150 (P415)
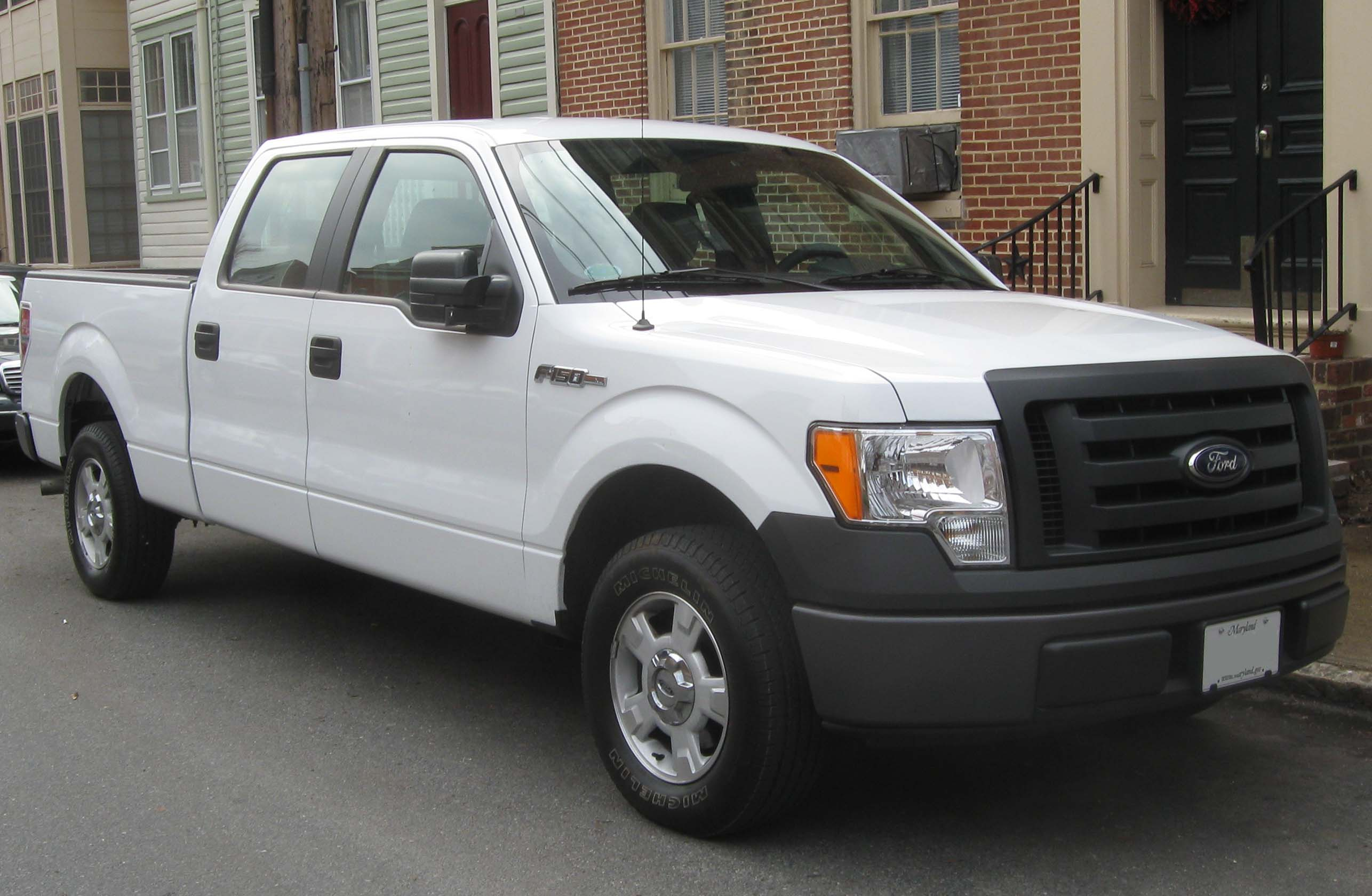
- 2009 F-150 XL SuperCrew

Overview
- Manufacturer: Ford
- Also called: Ford Lobo (XLT, Lariat, King Ranch and Harley Davidson versions; Mexico); Ford Lobo Raptor (Mexico)); Lincoln Mark LT (Mexico, F-150 Platinum elsewhere)
- Production: October 2008 – December 2014
- Model years: 2009–2014
- Assembly: Dearborn, Michigan, United States (Dearborn Truck); Claycomo, Missouri, United States (Kansas City Assembly); Valencia, Venezuela (Valencia Assembly); Cuautitlán, Mexico (Cuautitlán Assembly)
- Designer: Pat Schiavone (2005, 2006)

Body and chassis
- Body style: 2-door single cab 2+2 door extended cab 4-door crew cab
- Layout: Front engine, rear-wheel drive / four-wheel drive
- Platform: Ford T platform (T1)
- Related: Ford F-150 SVT Raptor; Hennessey VelociRaptor SUV; Ford Expedition

Powertrain
- Engine: 4.6 L (281 CID) 2V Modular V8; 4.6 L (281 CID) 3V Modular V8; 5.4 L (330 CID) 3V Modular V8; 3.5 L EcoBoost V6; 3.7 L Ti-VCT V6; 5.0 L (302 CID) Coyote V8; 6.2 L (379 CID) 2V Boss V8
- Transmission: 4-speed 4R75E automatic (with 4.6L 2V); 6-speed 6R80 automatic (with other engines)

Dimensions
- Wheelbase: 125.8–163.2 in (3,195–4,145 mm): Regular cab 6.5' box 2009–2011: 125.8 in (3,195 mm) 2012–2014: 125.9 in (3,198 mm); SuperCab 5.5' box 2009 only: 132.8 in (3,373 mm); Regular cab 8' box, SuperCab 6.5' box and SuperCrew 5.5' box 2009–2011: 144.4 in (3,668 mm) 2012–2014: 144.5 in (3,670 mm); SuperCrew 6.5' box 2009–2011: 156.6 in (3,978 mm) 2012–2014: 156.5 in (3,975 mm); SuperCab 8' box 2009–2011: 163.2 in (4,145 mm) 2012–2014: 163.1 in (4,143 mm)
- Length: 213.1–250.4 in (5,413–6,360 mm): Regular cab 6.5' box 2009–2011: 213.1 in (5,413 mm) 2012–2014: 213.2 in (5,415 mm); SuperCab 5.5' box 2009 only: 219.9 in (5,585 mm); Regular cab 8' box, SuperCab 6.5' box, and SuperCrew 5.5' box 2009–2011: 231.7 in (5,885 mm) 2012–2014: 231.9 in (5,890 mm); SuperCrew 6.5' box 2009–2011: 243.7 in (6,190 mm) 2012–2014: 243.9 in (6,195 mm); SuperCab 8' box 2009–2011: 250.3 in (6,358 mm) 2012–2014: 250.4 in (6,360 mm)
- Width: 2009–2011: 78.9 in (2,004 mm); 2012–2014: 79.2 in (2,012 mm); SVT Raptor: 86.3 in (2,192 mm)
- Height: 74.3–76.7 in (1,887–1,948 mm): Regular cab 2009–2011 Regular Cab 6.5' box: 76.3 in (1,938 mm) 2012–2014 Regular Cab 6.5' box: 76.0 in (1,930 mm) 2009–2011 Regular Cab 8' box: 76.3 in (1,938 mm) 2012–2014 Regular Cab 8' box: 76.0 in (1,930 mm); SuperCab 2009 SuperCab 5.5' box: 76.3 in (1,938 mm) 2009–2011 SuperCab 6.5' box: 76.4 in (1,941 mm) 2012–2014 SuperCab 6.5' box: 76.1 in (1,933 mm) 2009–2011 SuperCab 8' box: 76.2 in (1,935 mm) 2012–2014 SuperCab 8' box: 75.7 in (1,923 mm); SuperCrew 2009–2011 SuperCrew 5.5' box: 74.3 in (1,887 mm) 2012–2014 SuperCrew 5.5' box: 76.7 in (1,948 mm) 2009–2011 SuperCrew 6.5' box: 76.0 in (1,930 mm) 2012–2014 SuperCrew 6.5' box: 75.6 in (1,920 mm); SVT Raptor SuperCab: 78.5 in (1,994 mm) SuperCrew:78.4 in (1,991 mm)
- Curb weight: 4,685 to 6,210 lbs

Chronology
- Predecessor: Ford F-Series eleventh generation (MY 2004–2008)
- Successor: Ford F-Series thirteenth generation (MY 2015–2020)

The twelfth generation of the Ford F-Series is a light-duty pickup truck that was produced by Ford from the 2009 to 2014 model years. Initially slotted between the Ford Ranger and Ford Super Duty in size, the F-150 became the smallest Ford truck in North America following the 2011 withdrawal of the Ranger (in North America). The final generation of the F-150 produced with a separate body design from the Super Duty trucks (F-250 to F-550), the twelfth generation again adopted an all-new chassis and body, also marking an extensive transition to the powertrain lineup.

Alongside the all-new model design, the new generation started a model shift for the F-150. In all but the most fleet-oriented trim levels, Ford introduced higher-quality interior materials and features. In the United States, the Lincoln Mark LT was repackaged as the highest-content Ford F-150 Platinum trim (a Mark LT based on the twelfth generation was designed, exclusive to Mexico). For 2010, the SVT Raptor was introduced as the highest-performance F-Series truck; in contrast to the previous Ford SVT Lightning trucks, the Raptor was optimized for off-road performance.

In North America, the twelfth-generation F-150 was assembled by Ford at its Dearborn Truck facility (Dearborn, Michigan) and its Kansas City Assembly facility (Claycomo, Missouri). In December 2014, production of the model line ended, with Ford introducing the thirteenth-generation F-Series.

== Design history ==
Ford revealed the 2009 F-150 design at the 2008 North American International Auto Show in Detroit. Development began under chief engineer Matt O'Leary in November 2003 under the code name "P-415," after P-221 production began in June 2003. General design work was done under Patrick Schiavone into late 2005, with further exterior changes taking place during late 2006 to the tailgate design and wheel lip arches during a development hiatus. The final design freeze later took place by early 2007. Production of the series began in October 2008 at Ford's Kansas City Assembly Plant.

Ford originally planned to expand the F-Series platform by reintroducing the F-100 as a mid-size truck. Known internally as P525, the F-100 would have served as the global replacement for Ford Ranger in 2010 or 2011. The project was ultimately shelved, with the company developing the Ranger T6 as a global mid-size truck (including for North America). Ford focused on developing fuel-efficient powertrains such as the EcoBoost V6 and the 6-speed automatic transmission for the F-150.

The 2009 F-150 featured a larger and more flexible interior, an updated three-bar grille, and additional choices of trim levels. The chassis included lighter-weight, high-strength steel for better fuel economy and safety as well as improved payload and towing capacity. V8 engine options were standard in all models; no six-cylinder was available (similar to the new-style 2004 model). All F-150s included an automatic transmission as standard equipment, as a manual transmission was no longer available. Regular cab models were once again produced with standard-length doors rather than two short, rear-opening doors (last used in 2004 Heritage models). All Flareside models in 2009 were made with new badging on the previous generation's boxes and were discontinued at the end of the model year when stock had run out, echoing a similar situation in the first year of the eighth generation. The interior was more luxurious and offered more features than previous-generation trucks. The Ford Sync system became available for the first time, including both Bluetooth functionality, and USB and auxiliary inputs, and a premium Sony audio system was also available for the first time on higher trim levels. The center stack was also redesigned to integrate the audio system and climate controls into a single unit (the base XL model still included a separate AM/FM radio unit with an auxiliary audio input as standard equipment). The instrument cluster was now the same in all trim levels of the F-150 (and now included a tachometer as standard equipment), although the gauge facings still varied by trim level.

For the 2010 model year, the SVT Raptor off-road truck was introduced. Initially available as a SuperCab with a 5.5-foot box, it came with the 310 hp 5.4L V8; an optional 411 hp 6.2L V8, which would debut in the Super Duty line for 2011, was added later in that year. The standard wheel diameter on FX4 models was enlarged to 18". The Harley-Davidson Edition and FX2 trims also made a return.

For 2010, the F-150 saw minimal changes, although the warning chimes were changed to match the rest of the new Ford lineup. The keyless entry remote design was also changed, and now offered integrated remote start (previously, opting for remote start would require an additional, single-button remote), as well as an integrated key. Also new for 2010 was the new MyKey system as standard equipment on all F-150 models (excluding the base XL, where it was an option). The MyKey system allowed for parents of younger drivers, as well as fleet operators, to configure one of the vehicle's ignition keys as the vehicle's MyKey, and could limit the vehicle's top speed, mute the vehicle's audio system until the driver's seatbelt was fastened, limit the maximum volume of the audio system, and provide both audible and visual warnings whenever a predetermined speed was reached. When the MyKey system was enabled, a message would appear on the instrument cluster display screen, denoting "MyKey Active – Drive Safely," to remind the driver to drive responsibly.

2011 marked a major upgrade to the powertrain lineup. In the interest of increasing fuel economy, both versions of the 4.6L V8 and the 5.4L V8 were discontinued. In their place were a 3.7L V6, a 5.0L V8, and an all-new 3.5L twin-turbocharged V6 dubbed EcoBoost which produced up to 365 hp. The 6.2L V8 is now standard on the SVT Raptor and Harley-Davidson Edition, and the all-new Lariat Limited trim, and available with the Platinum and Lariat trims. Also for 2011, the instrument cluster was significantly modernized, and a new "premium" instrument cluster was introduced with a 4.2-inch (11 cm) color LCD "Productivity Screen" with "Truck Apps" that provided important information such as approach and departure angles, altitude, and current 4WD system status. The base XL trim received new eight-spoke styled steel wheels as standard equipment, replacing the older five-spoke styled steel wheels that were carried over from the eleventh generation.

For 2012, the F-150 sported a ten-trim lineup (XL, STX, XLT, FX2, FX4, Lariat, King Ranch, Platinum, Harley-Davidson, and SVT Raptor). The Heavy Duty Payload Package was now available with the SuperCrew with 6.5' bed, and the SuperCab with 8' bed no longer required the Heavy Duty Payload Package.

For 2013, the F-150 received minor changes such as a new 2011+ Super Duty–styled grille, new optional 18-, 20-, or 22-inch wheels, Sync with MyFord, MyFord Touch navigation system, new power-folding and telescoping trailer tow mirrors (taken from the 2008–2016 Super Duty models), high-intensity discharge headlamps, three new color options (Blue Jeans Metallic, Kodiak Brown Metallic and Ruby Red Clearcoat Metallic), new Alcantara seats in the FX Appearance Package, black or pecan leather in Platinum, the return of the Limited model (albeit more chrome and directly replacing the Harley-Davidson trim level), and the 6.2-liter V8 being made available in XLT, FX2, and FX4 (SuperCab 6.5' and SuperCrew configurations only).

For 2014, a special edition called the Tremor was introduced, essentially an EcoBoost-equipped FX2 or FX4 in a regular cab model with a 6.5' bed, a special FX Appearance Package, a flow-through center console with bucket seats, and a 4.10:1 rear axle ratio.

Also new in 2014, the STX trim level also became available on SuperCrew models with the 5.5' box. In addition, an STX Sport package was added for 2014 including 20" wheels, black cloth seats, and black exterior accents.

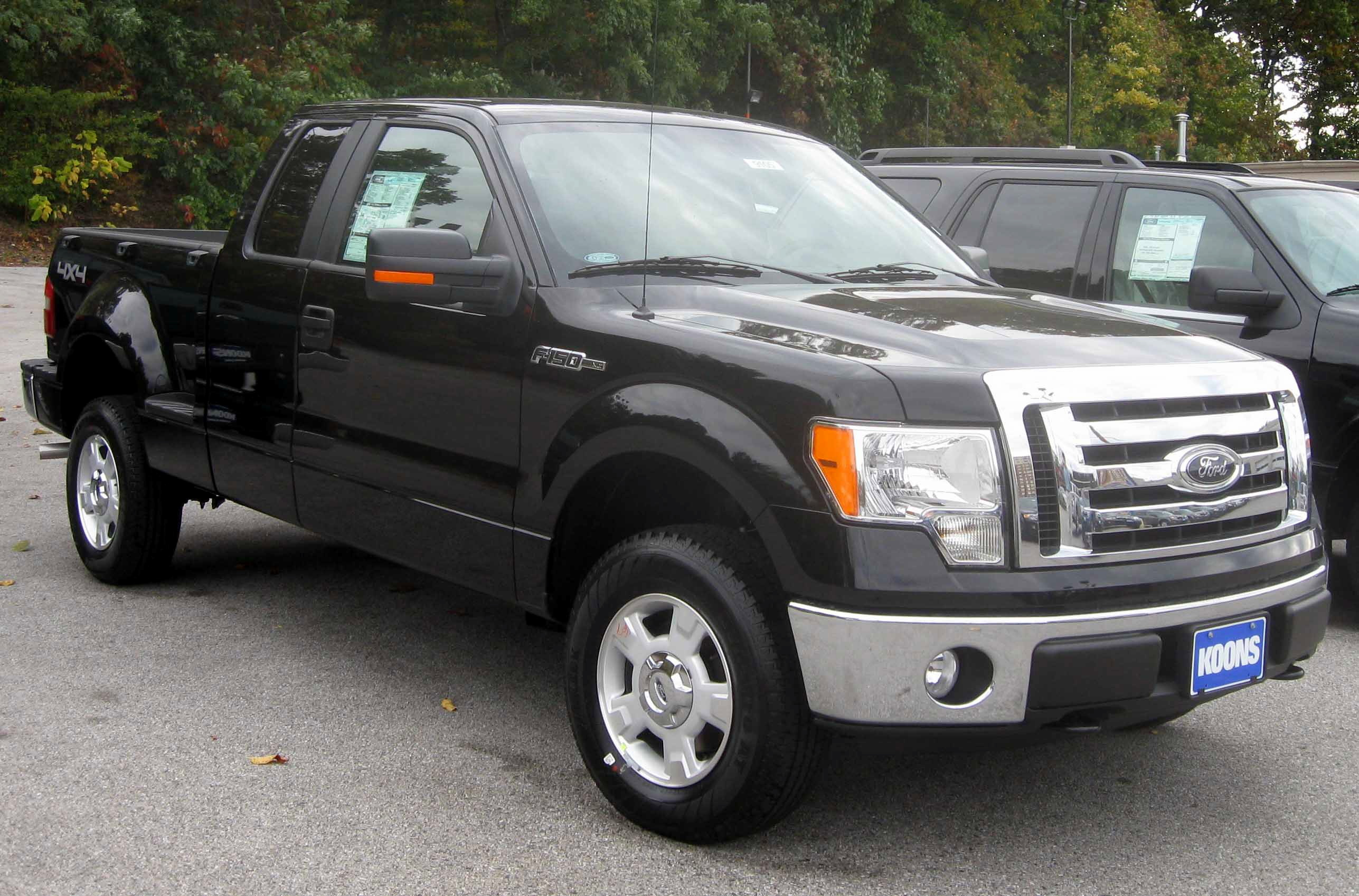
2009 F-150 XLT SuperCab Flareside

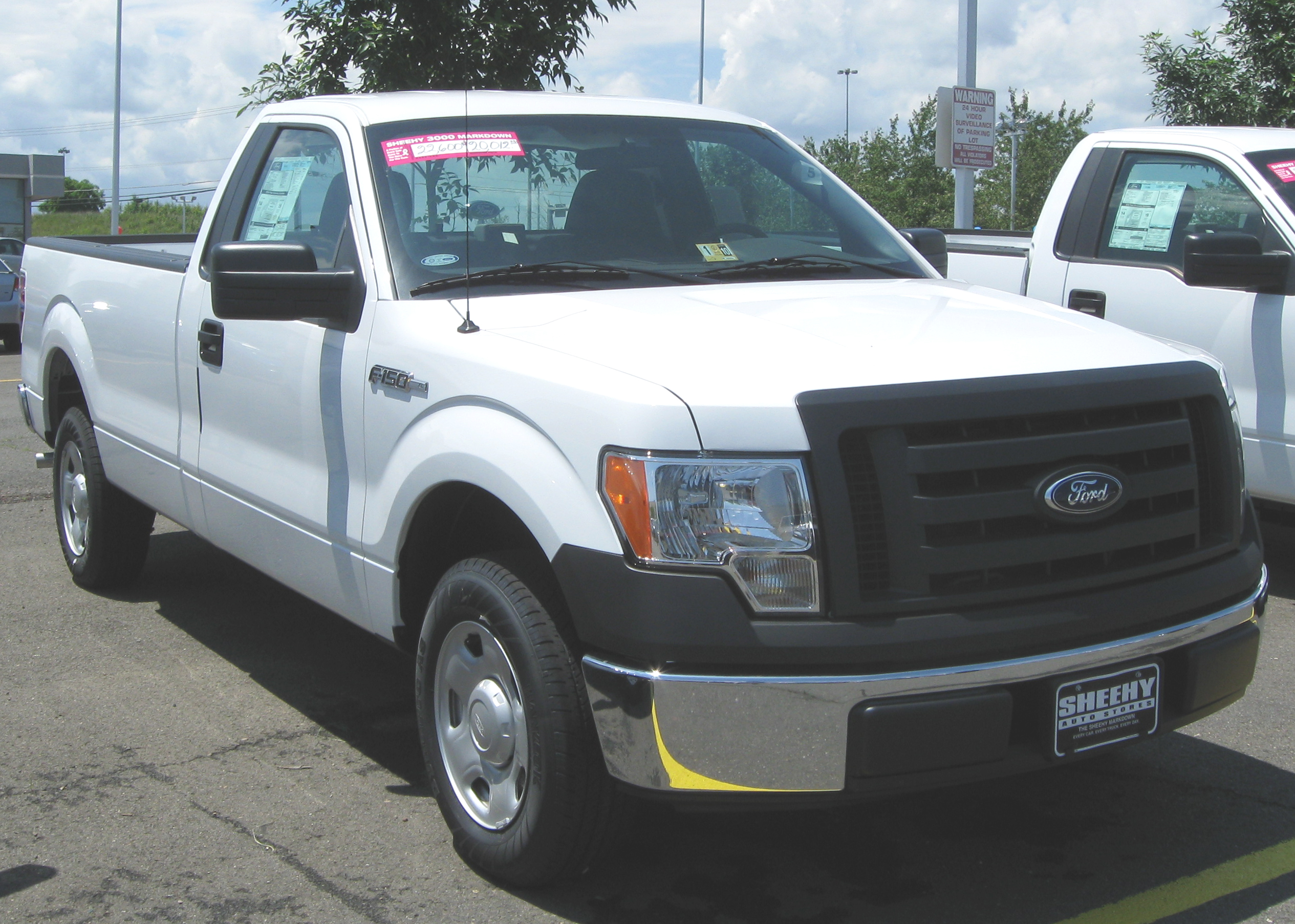
2009 F-150 XL Regular Cab

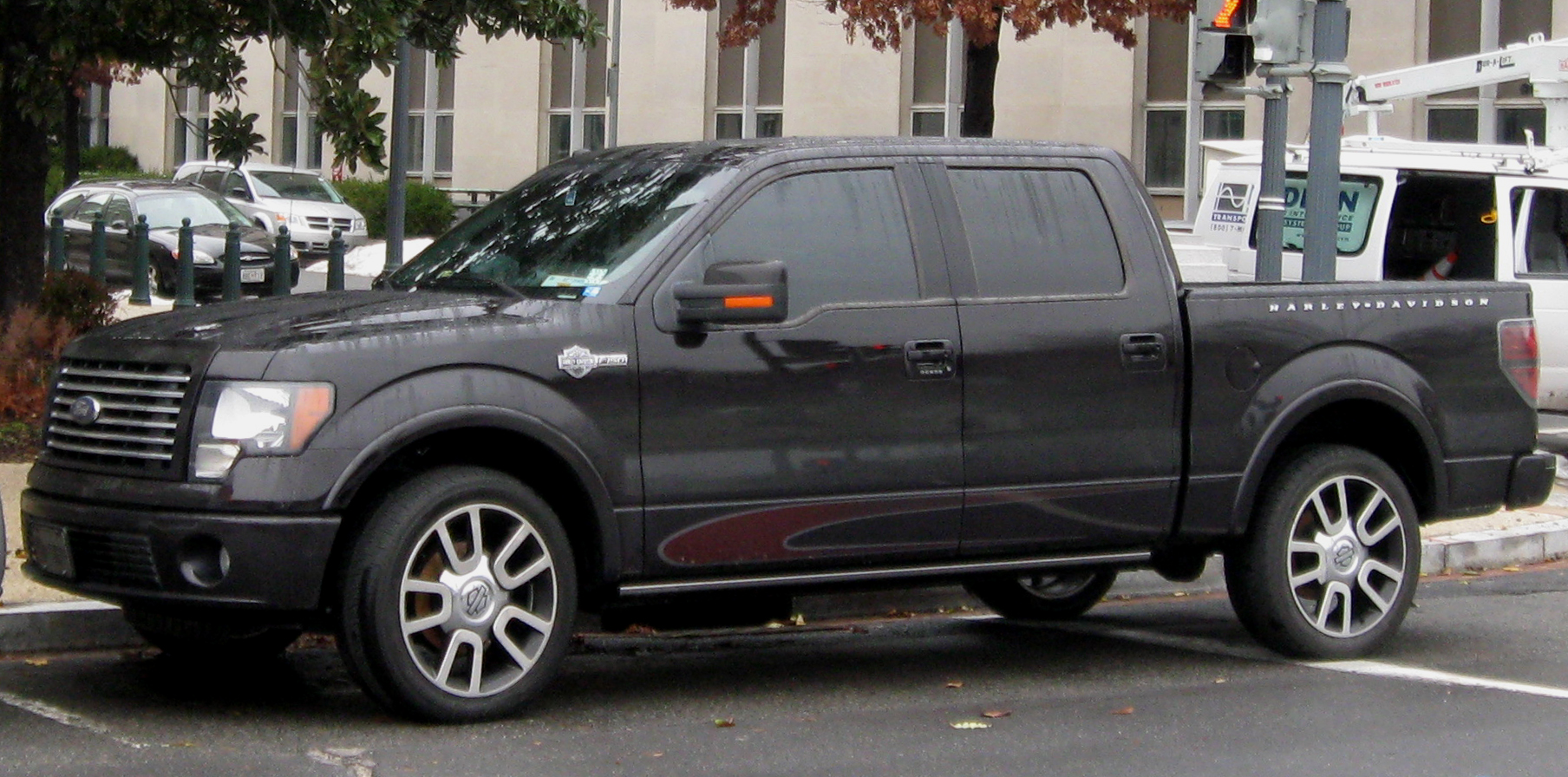
2010 F-150 Harley Davidson

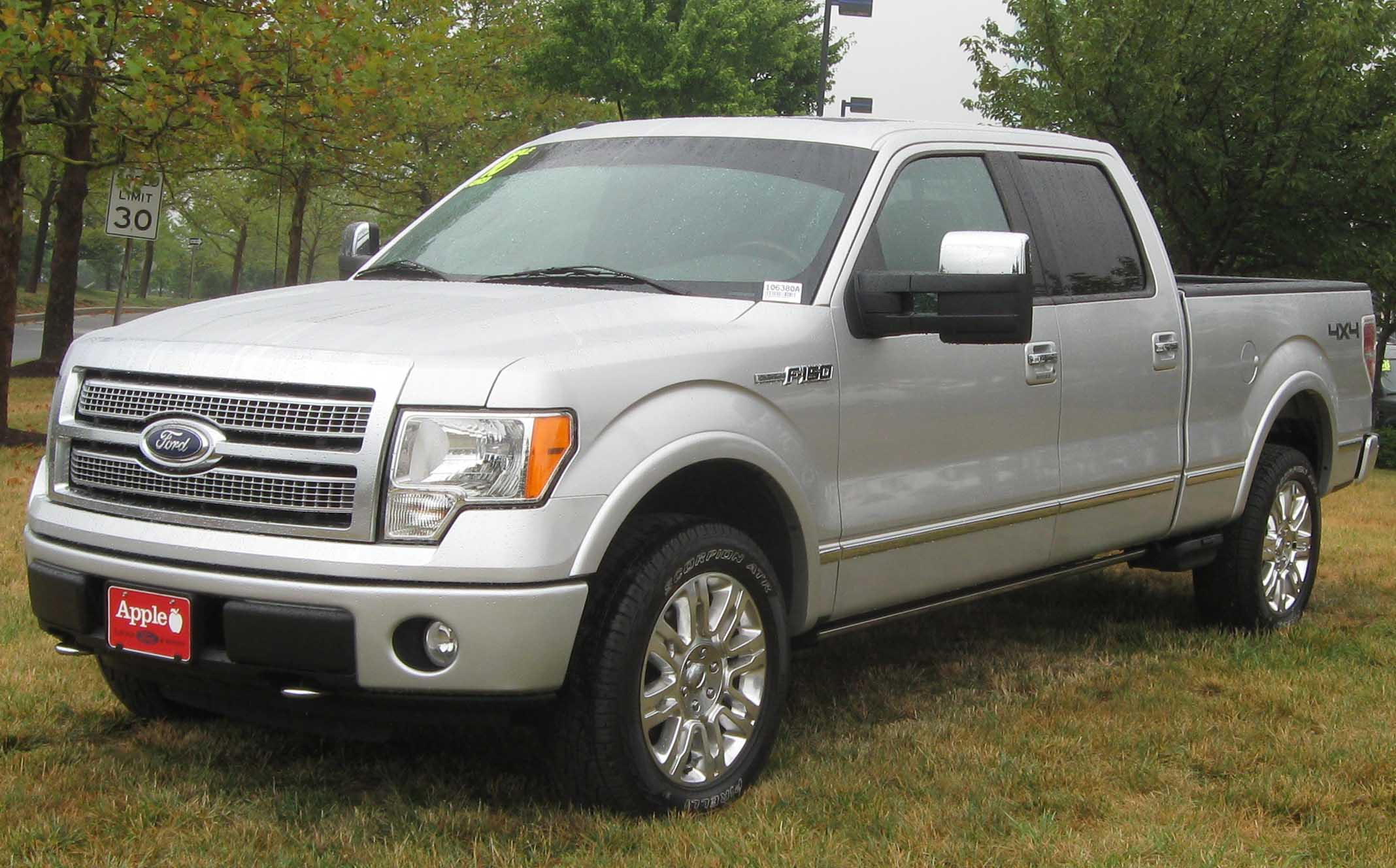
2010 F-150 Platinum

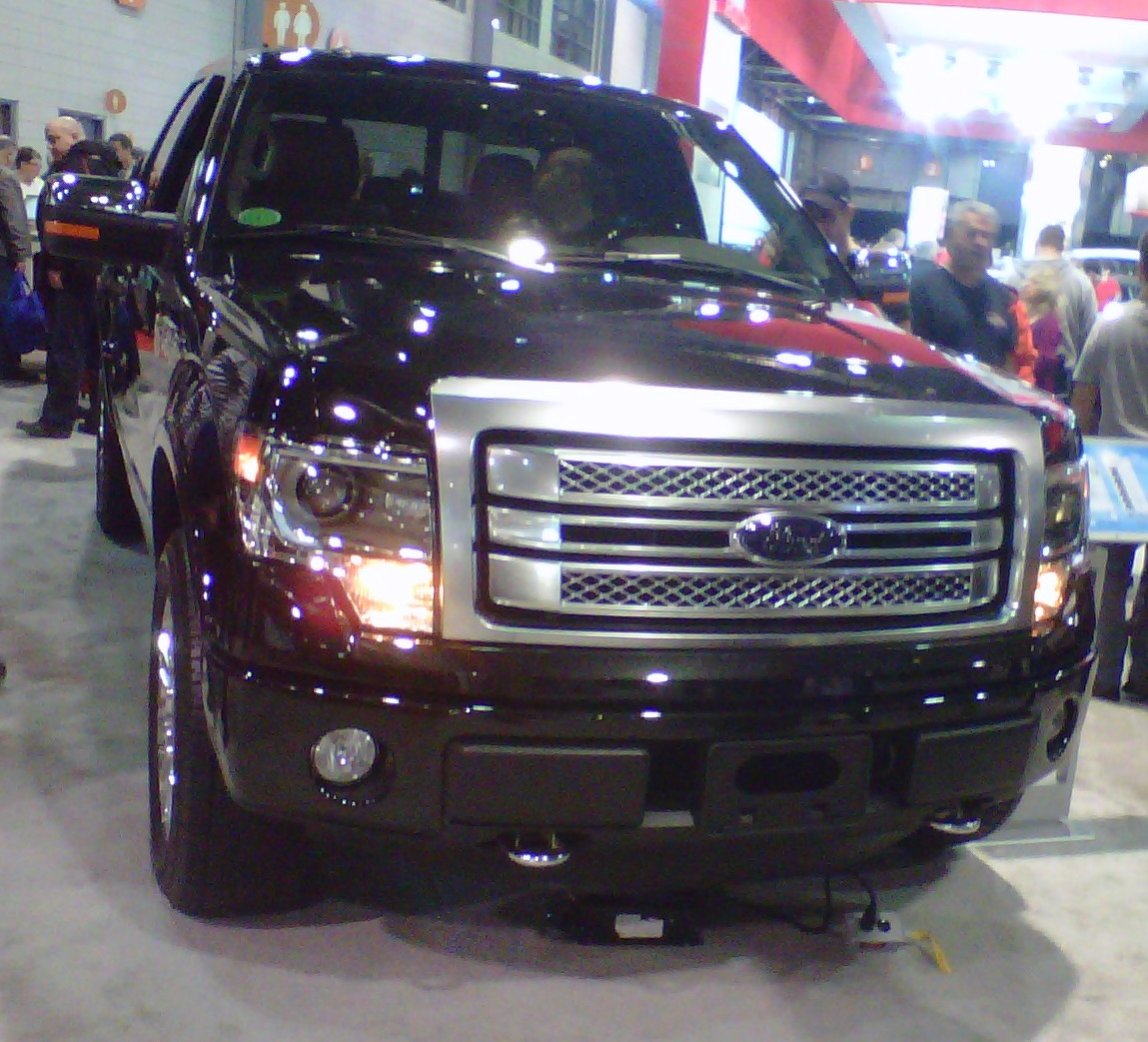
2013 F-150 Platinum

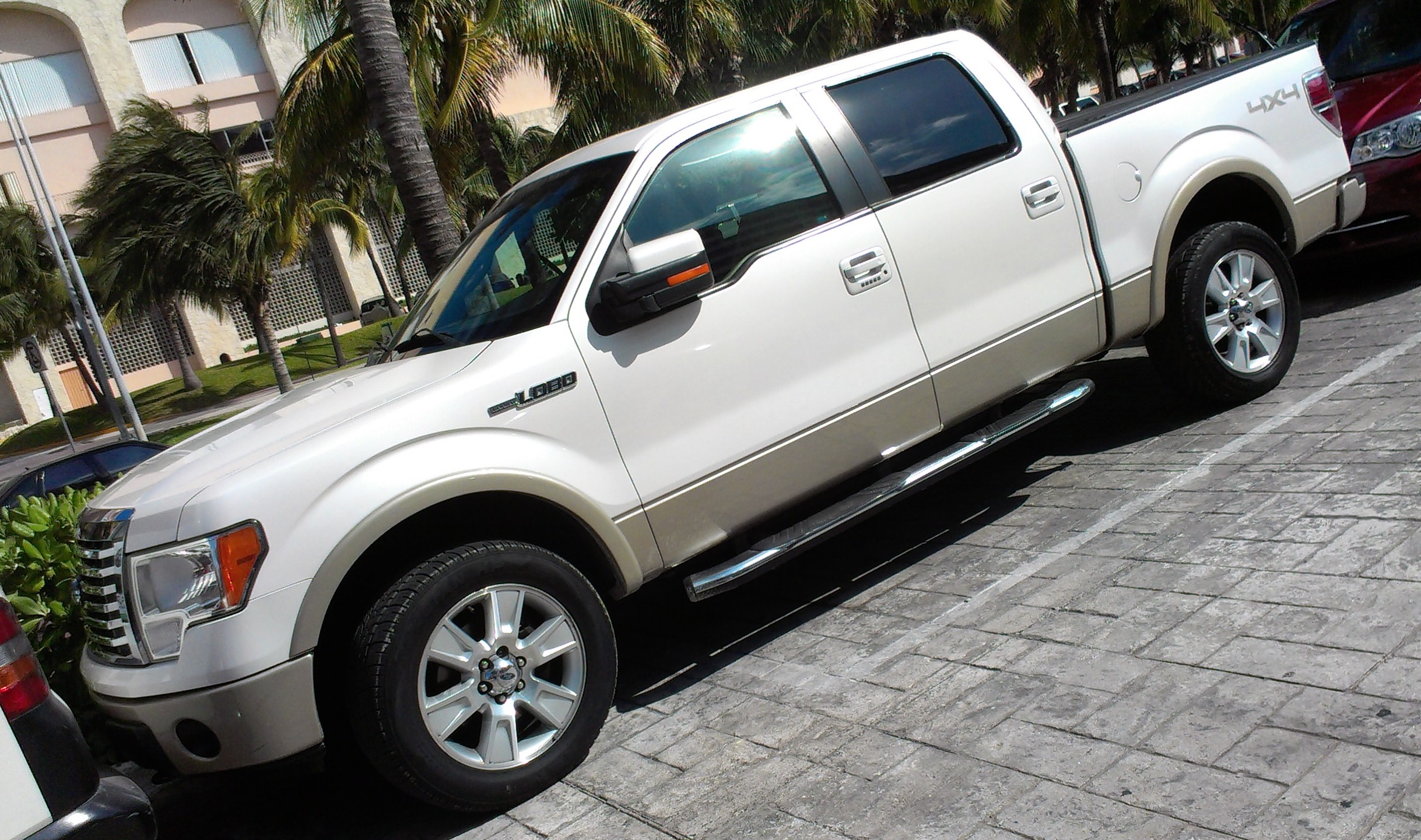
Ford Lobo Lariat SuperCrew

== Powertrain ==
Three engines were offered with the 2009 redesign: a revised 5.4L 3-valve-per-cylinder Triton V8 that is E85 capable with an output rating of 320 hp (239 kW) and 395 lb⋅ft (536 N⋅m) of torque (both ratings on E85), a 292 hp (218 kW) 4.6L 3-valve-per-cylinder V8, and a 248 hp (185 kW) 4.6L 2-valve V8. The 3-valve 5.4L and 4.6L V8s were mated to Ford's new 6R80E 6-speed automatic transmission, while the 4R75E 4-speed automatic transmission was carried over for the 2-valve 4.6L V8. The 4.2L OHV V6 engine was dropped because of the closure of the Essex engine plant where it was produced.

For the 2011 model year, an all-new engine lineup was offered. Two of the engines, the 3.7L V6 and 5.0L V8 both used in the contemporary Ford Mustang, offer E85 flex-fuel capability. The 6.2L V8 used in the 2011 Ford Super Duty was made available with the F-150 Platinum, Lariat, SVT Raptor, Harley-Davidson, and Lariat Limited trims. Finally, the 3.5L direct-injected twin-turbo EcoBoost V6 was offered in the F-150 starting in early 2011. All engines were paired with a new six-speed automatic transmission (6R80). Electric power-assisted steering was made available on all engines except the 6.2L V8. The F-150 could be equipped for a maximum towing and hauling capacity of 11,300 lbs and 3,060 lbs, respectively.

Engine	Years	Power	Torque	Availability
4.6 L (281 CID) 2V Modular V8	2009–2010	248 hp (185 kW) at 4,750 rpm	294 lb⋅ft (399 N⋅m) at 4,000 rpm	Standard on XL, STX, and Regular Cab XLT; Not available with SuperCrew 4×4 or SuperCab 8' bed
4.6 L (281 CID) 3V Modular V8	2009–2010	292 hp (218 kW) at 5,700 rpm	320 lb⋅ft (434 N⋅m) at 4,000 rpm	Standard on XL SuperCrew 4×4, XLT SuperCab/SuperCrew, and FX2; Available on XL, STX, and XLT (except with Regular Cab 4×2 6.5' bed model); Not available with SuperCab 8' bed
5.4 L (330 CID) 3V Triton V8	2009–2010	310 hp (231 kW) at 5,000 rpm	365 lb⋅ft (495 N⋅m) at 3,500 rpm	Standard on FX4, Lariat, King Ranch, Platinum, Harley-Davidson, and SVT Raptor, and with the Heavy-Duty Payload Package (Regular/SuperCab with 8' bed); Available on XL, XLT, and FX2 (except with Regular Cab 4×2 6.5' bed model); Not available on STX
3.7 L (227 CID) Ti-VCT 4V Duratec V6	2011–2014	302 hp (225 kW) at 6,500 rpm	278 lb⋅ft (377 N⋅m) at 4,000 rpm	Standard on XL, STX, and XLT (except with SuperCab 8' bed, SuperCrew 4×4, SuperCrew 6.5' bed, or Heavy Duty Payload Package)
5.0 L (302 CID) 4V Coyote V8	2011–2014	360 hp (268 kW) at 5,500 rpm	380 lb⋅ft (515 N⋅m) at 4,250 rpm	Standard on FX2, FX4, Lariat, King Ranch, Platinum, SuperCab with 8' bed, SuperCrew 4×4, SuperCrew with 6.5' bed, and with Heavy Duty Payload Package; Available on XL, STX, and XLT
3.5 L (213 CID) 4V EcoBoost V6	2011–2014	365 hp (272 kW) at 5,000 rpm	420 lb⋅ft (569 N⋅m) at 2,500 rpm	Standard on Limited (2013–2014) and Tremor; Available on XL, XLT, FX2, FX4, Lariat, King Ranch, Platinum, and with Heavy Duty Payload Package; Not available on STX models or on XL/STX/XLT Regular Cab 6.5' bed
6.2 L (379 CID) 2V Boss SOHC V8	2010–2014	411 hp (306 kW) at 5,500 rpm	434 lb⋅ft (588 N⋅m) at 4,500 rpm	Standard on Harley-Davidson (2011–2012), Lariat Limited (2011), and SVT Raptor (2011–2014); Optional on Lariat, Platinum (2011–2014); XLT, FX2, FX4 (2013–2014); and SVT Raptor (2010); SuperCab and SuperCrew models only (except with 8' bed)

== Safety ==
The 2009 Ford F-150 featured front-seat side impact airbags and Ford's Safety Canopy System for the first and second rows as head protection in the event of a side impact. It also featured Ford's exclusive AdvancedTrac RSC (Roll Stability Control)—an electronic stability control and anti-rollover safety feature also available in other Ford vehicles, from the Fusion to the Expedition.

The F-150 comes standard with AdvanceTrac Electronic Stability Control, front and rear row side curtain airbags, and front row torso side airbags.

== Concepts ==
At the 2008 SEMA show, four 2009 F-150 concepts were unveiled: the F-150 Heavy Duty DEWALT Contractor, the FX4 by X-Treme Toyz, the F-150 by Street Scene Equipment, and the Hi-Pa Drive F-150. The Heavy Duty DEWALT Contractor was built in a DeWalt theme. The FX4, also called Fahrenheit F-150, was built for outdoor lifestyle enthusiasts. The Street Scene Equipment version is a lowered truck built with performance and style. The Hi-Pa Drive F-150 was powered by four electric in-wheel motors rated over 480 hp (360 kW) and over 375 ft⋅lbf (508 N⋅m) torque combined.

== Trim ==
- XL – Included: Vinyl upholstery, post-crash alert system, manual mirrors (power mirrors on SuperCrew), 17" steel wheels, light-tinted windows, air conditioning, an AM/FM stereo with clock, power accessory delay, tachometer, and manual windows and locks (power windows and locks with one-touch-open driver-door window on SuperCrew).
- STX – Added: STX decals, body color bumpers, 17" alloy wheels, an AM/FM stereo with single-CD player and an auxiliary input jack, cloth upholstery, front seat armrest with cupholders and storage bin, and rear cupholders (SuperCab).
- XLT - Added: chrome bumpers, keyless entry, power mirrors, 17" alloy wheels, automatic headlamps, color-coordinated carpet and floor mats, power locks and windows with automatic driver's side window, visors with covered mirrors, compass, tinted rear windows, and later, fog lamps.
- FX2/FX4 – Added: FX2/FX4 off-road decals, fog lamps, Ford's proprietary keypad entry system marketed as SecuriCode, 18" alloy wheels, locking rear axle, skid plates, trailer tow package, SIRIUS Satellite radio with 6-month subscription, leather-wrapped steering wheel, power driver's seat, and rear window defroster. Later features were a 120V power inverter, message center, and Ford SYNC.
- Lariat – Added: monotone paint, power, heated mirrors with memory, turn signals and auto-dimming driver's side feature, 18" bright alloy wheels, body color door handles, lighted visor mirrors, dual zone automatic temp control, Ford SYNC, message center, heated front seats, color-coordinated leather-wrapped steering wheel with audio controls, 10-way power front seats, memory driver's seat, leather trimmed seats, auto-dimming rear view mirror, and power pedals with memory.
- King Ranch – Added: two tone paint, power fold, heated, chrome capped sideview mirrors with turn signals, memory, security approach lamps, and auto-dimming driver's side, 18" 7-spoke wheels with King Ranch logo, color coordinated box side rail and platform running boards, chaparral-leather wrapped steering wheel, an AM/FM stereo with 6-disc in dash CD player with MP3 capability and speed compensated volume control, garage door opener, chaparral leather trimmed power, heated and cooled front seats, front flow-through console with chaparral leather trimmed lid and floor shifter, King Ranch badges and mats, reverse sensing system, backup camera, and later, remote start.
- Platinum – Added: body color bumpers, "PLATINUM" badges, front tow hooks, chrome door handles, power deployable running boards, power fold, heated, chrome capped mirrors with turn signals, memory, security approach lamps, and auto-dimming driver's side, 20" aluminum wheels, chrome exhaust tip, bright bodyside accent moldings, unique leather-wrapped steering wheel with power tilt column, memory and audio controls, brushed aluminum applique on center panel and console, an AM/FM stereo with 6-disc in-dash CD player with MP3 capability and speed compensated volume control, sun visors with illuminated mirrors, garage door opener, leather trimmed power, heated and cooled front seats, flow through console, with leather-trimmed lid and floor shifter, power sliding rear window, rain sensing windshield wipers, reverse sensing system, and backup camera. Later standard features were remote start.
- Lariat Limited (2011 only) – Added (from Lariat): 6.2 L V8 engine, power-assisted steering, a Sony AM/FM stereo with single-CD/DVD player and navigation, rearview camera, remote start, unique cluster, blacked out headlamps, body color door handles with chrome strap, two-tone leather trimmed seats, body color bumpers, "LIMITED" lettering, power deployable running boards, trailer brake controller, 22" forged aluminum wheels, power heated mirrors with memory, turn signals, and auto dimming driver's side, and security approach lamps, heated rear seats, and power sunroof. Available only with SuperCrew 5.5' bed. Approximately 3,700 examples were made.
- Harley-Davidson – Added (from Lariat): 6.2 L V8 engine, power assisted steering, a Sony AM/FM stereo with single-CD/DVD player and navigation, rear view camera, remote start, black and silver leather-trimmed seats with Harley-Davidson logo, engine tuned insert, floor shifter, heated rear seats, memory adjustable pedals, remote start, "HARLEY DAVIDSON F-150" tailgate and fender badges, power deployable running boards, trailer brake controller, 22" alloy wheels, and unique clusters. Available only with SuperCrew 5.5' bed.
- SVT Raptor – Added (from XLT): 6.2 L V8 engine, power driver's seat, Hill Descent Control, leather-and-cloth upholstery, power-sliding rear window, trailer tow package, auto dimming rearview mirror with compass, leather wrapped steering wheel with audio controls and SYNC, message center and trip computer, SIRIUS Satellite radio, air extractors in hood, 17" painted alloy wheels with off-road tires, front and rear tow hooks, and Ford's proprietary keypad entry system, marketed as SecuriCode.

== SVT Raptor ==
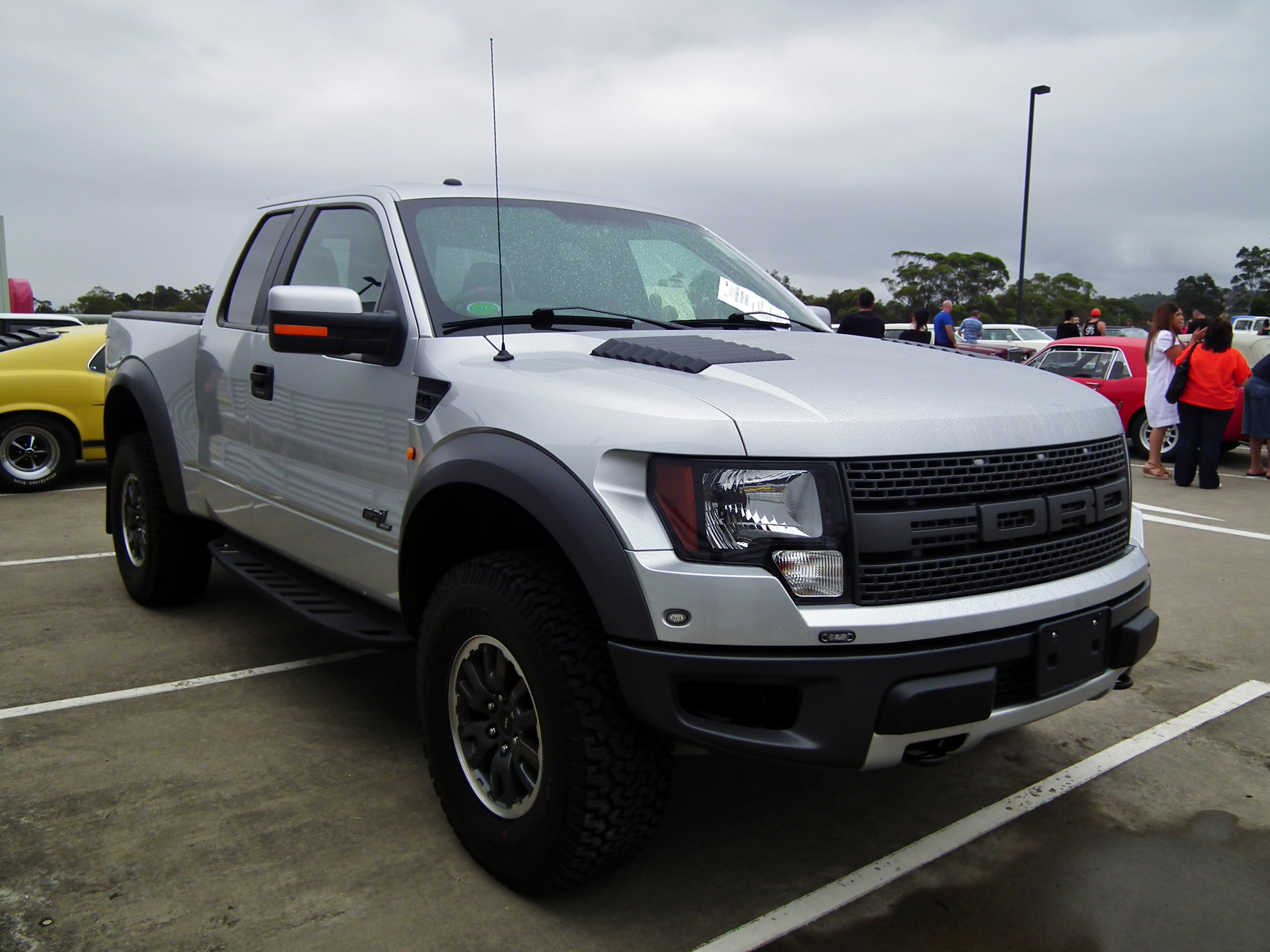
2012 F-150 SVT Raptor SuperCab (Australia)

For 2010, Ford introduced the F-150 SVT Raptor, the third F-Series truck developed by Ford SVT. In line with the previous SVT Lightnings, the Raptor was the highest-performance F-Series truck, including modifications to the chassis and powertrain. In sharp contrast to the street and track-oriented Lightning, the Raptor was developed as a street-legal version of a desert racing vehicle.

Distinguished by its "FORD" grille badging, the SVT Raptor is fitted with a redesigned wide-track suspension, allowing for much longer wheel travel; other electronics optimized its traction both on and off-road. Powered by a 411 hp 6.2 L V8 from the Super Duty trucks (a 310 hp 5.4 L V8 was also offered in 2010), the Raptor was the most powerful version of the F-150.

Initially offered as a SuperCab, the SVT Raptor added a SuperCrew in 2011, one year later. Both were exclusively available with a 5.5' bed.

== Chinese copy controversy ==
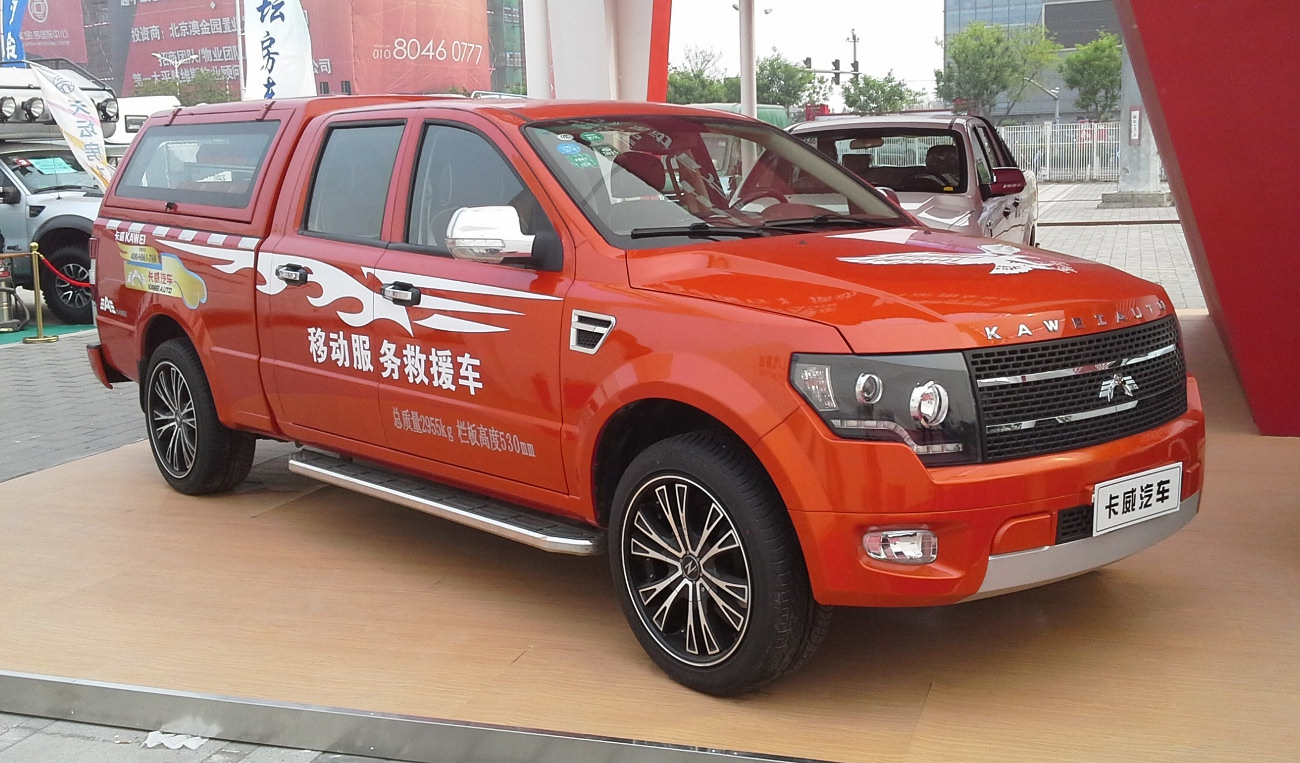
Kawei K1.

In 2014, Chinese company Jiangsu Kawei Automotive released the Kawei K1, which appeared to be nearly identical to the Ford F-150.

When interviewed by Fox News in 2014, a Ford spokesman said they were aware of the Kawei and their legal counsel was investigating how best to address the matter.
