= Ford F-Series (thirteenth generation) =

Thirteenth generation of the Ford F-Series pickup trucks

Thirteenth-generation Ford F-Series (P552)
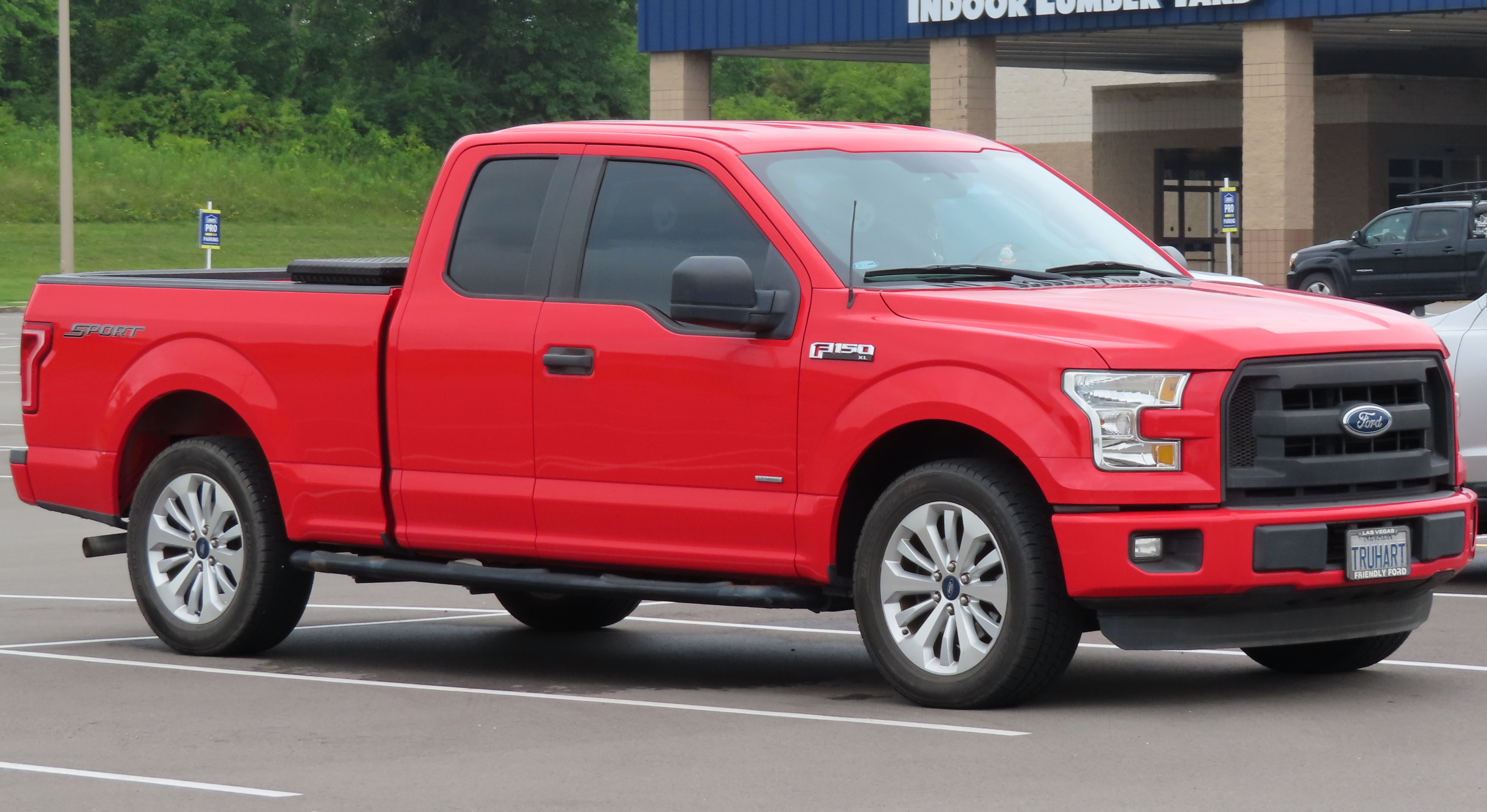
- 2016 Ford F-150 XL SuperCab

Overview
- Manufacturer: Ford Motor Company
- Also called: Ford Lobo (Mexico)
- Production: November 11, 2014 – October 2020
- Model years: 2015–2020
- Assembly: United States: Claycomo, Missouri (Kansas City Assembly); Dearborn, Michigan (Dearborn Truck Plant); Gurun, Kedah, Malaysia (CKD)
- Designer: Gordon Platto (chief designer); Brad Richards (exterior)

Body and chassis
- Class: Full-size pickup truck
- Body style: 2-door regular cab; 2+2-door extended cab, SuperCab; 4-door crew cab, SuperCrew
- Layout: Front-engine, rear-wheel drive; Front-engine, four-wheel drive
- Platform: Ford T3
- Related: Ford Atlas (concept); Ford Super Duty (P558); Ford Raptor (second generation)

Powertrain
- Engine: Gasoline: 3.3 L Cyclone V6; 3.5 L Cyclone V6; 2.7 L EcoBoost Nano twin-turbo V6; 3.5 L EcoBoost twin-turbo V6; 5.0 L Coyote V8; Diesel: 3.0 L Power Stroke turbo V6
- Transmission: 6-speed 6R80 automatic; 10-speed 10R80 automatic

Dimensions
- Wheelbase: 122.4–163.7 in (3,109–4,158 mm)
- Length: 209.3–250.5 in (5,316–6,363 mm)
- Width: 79.9 in (2,029 mm)
- Height: 75.2–76.9 in (1,910–1,953 mm)
- Curb weight: 4,069–5,697 lb (1,846–2,584 kg)

Chronology
- Predecessor: Ford F-Series (twelfth generation); Ford SVT Raptor (P415); Mexico: Lincoln Mark LT
- Successor: Ford F-Series (fourteenth generation)

The thirteenth-generation Ford F-Series is a range of pickup trucks produced by Ford. Introduced for the 2015 model year, this generation of the F-Series is the first aluminum-intensive vehicle produced on a large scale by an American vehicle manufacturer. For the 2017 model year, the fourth-generation Super Duty line adopted the cab design of the F-150, consolidating the cab design on Ford light-duty trucks (F-550 and below) for the first time since the 1996 model year; the Super Duty trucks still retain separate bodywork and a heavier-duty frame.

After a two-year hiatus, a second generation of the Ford Raptor made its return for 2017 as a high-performance variant of the F-150, dropping the SVT prefix. In Mexico, the F-Series XL trim is marketed as the F-150, XLT and higher trims are named Lobo (Wolf in Spanish). The Mexican-market Lincoln Mark LT was discontinued completely, replaced by the Platinum and Limited trims sold elsewhere.

The thirteenth-generation F-Series was produced by Ford in Claycomo, Missouri (Kansas City Assembly), alongside the Ford Transit van, and at Dearborn, Michigan (Dearborn Truck Plant).

== Design overview ==
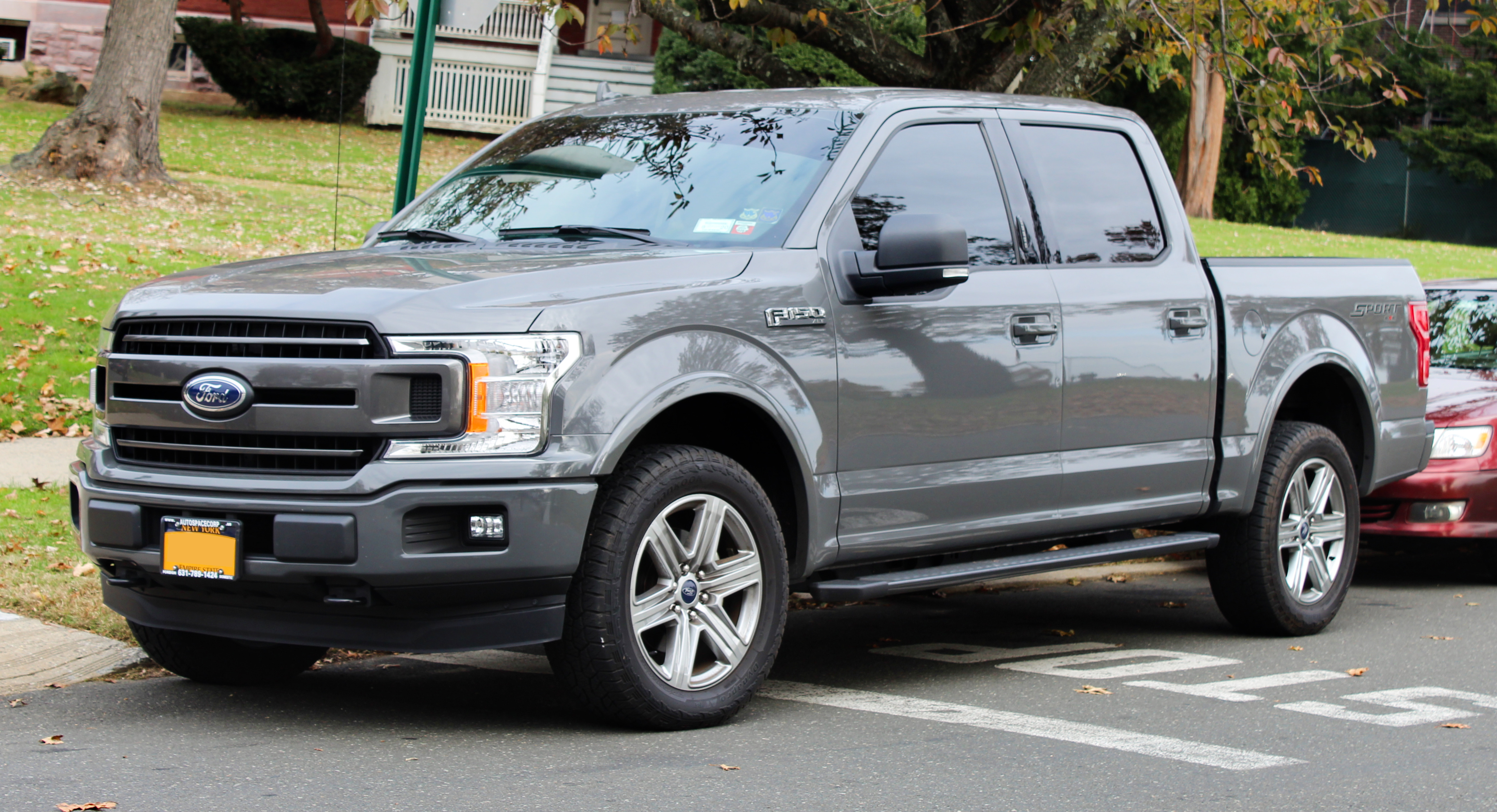
2018 F-150 XLT SuperCrew (Sport Appearance Package)

The thirteenth-generation F-Series was unveiled at the 2014 North American International Auto Show on January 13, 2014. It was nearly identical to the Atlas concept from 2013, but now in a production model F-150 (with the only exception of the wheel design, roof rails, side mirrors, instrument panel, and blue lighting; the retractable rear spoiler never made it to production), albeit 700 lbs lighter. A number of safety technologies and driver assistance features were introduced as options, including: 360° camera, adaptive cruise control, collision warning with brake support, blind spot information system (BLIS) with rear cross-traffic alert, and a lane-keeping system.

While not actually the first aluminum-bodied vehicle developed by Ford (the company developed 40 aluminum-bodied Mercury Sable prototypes in 1993, reducing curb weight by 400 pounds), the F-Series was the first Ford aluminum-bodied vehicle to make it to production. While changing the metal composition of the best-selling vehicle in the United States, 85% of the parts of the vehicle were domestically-sourced (as of 2016).

When the F-150 was equipped with the optional 2.7L EcoBoost V6 engine and two-wheel drive, it was able to comply with proposed future CAFE standards through 2024 without any modifications.

=== Chassis ===
While nearly all body panels of the F-150 were converted from steel to aluminum construction (the only significant sheet metal component constructed of steel is the firewall), the frame remained of steel construction, and the use of high-strength steel in the frame was increased from 23% to 77%. The aluminum body panels resulted in a nearly 750 lb reduction in curb weight. To showcase the durability of the aluminum-intensive design, Ford entered prototypes of the model disguised as twelfth generation F-150s in the Baja 1000.

=== Powertrain ===
The F-Series underwent a revision of its powertrain offerings, largely to expand its range of both powerful and fuel-efficient engines. As the entry-level V6, a naturally-aspirated 3.5L Ti-VCT V6 replaced the previous 3.7L V6; though lower in output, the redesign offered a better power-to-weight ratio. The 3.5L EcoBoost made its return, joined by the 5.0L flex-fuel V8; as the Raptor had gone on hiatus, the 6.2L V8 became exclusive to Super Duty trucks. Slotted between the two 3.5L V6 engines, a 2.7L EcoBoost V6 was introduced; unrelated to the larger EcoBoost engine, it is shared with the Ford Edge, Ford Fusion, and Lincoln Continental.

For model year 2017, the 3.5L EcoBoost engine underwent a redesign, increasing its output to 375 hp (450 hp for the Raptor); along with adding supplementary port fuel injection, the engine introduced auto start/stop capability. For model year 2018, the model line received three all-new engines, as a 3.3L V6 replaced the naturally-aspirated 3.5L V6 and the 2.7L EcoBoost V6 was redesigned (adopting many of the changes from the 3.5L EcoBoost engine). For the first time, a diesel engine was offered in the F-150, as a 250 hp 3.0L Power Stroke V6 was introduced during the model year, dependent on trim (commercial and fleet sales only, for XL and XLT trim). For 2019, the 450 hp version of the 3.5L engine was introduced to the flagship Limited trim.

As with the previous generation, the F-Series is offered solely with automatic transmissions. At initial launch, a 6-speed Ford 6R80 automatic was paired with all four engines. As part of the introduction of the 2017 Raptor, a 10-speed Ford 10R80 automatic (the first 10-speed transmission in a non-commercial vehicle) was paired to the 3.5L EcoBoost V6. For model year 2018, the 10-speed automatic was paired to both EcoBoost engines, the Power Stroke diesel, and the 5.0L V8 (with only the 3.3L V6 paired to the 6-speed automatic).

Thirteenth-generation F-Series Powertrain Details
Engine	Model Years	Output		VIN 8th Digit	Transmission
Engine	Model Years	Power	Torque	VIN 8th Digit	Transmission
3.3 L (204 cu in) Cyclone V6	2018–2020	290 hp (216 kW) at 6,500 rpm	265 lb⋅ft (359 N⋅m) at 4,000 rpm	B	6-speed 6R80 automatic
3.5 L (213 cu in) Cyclone V6	2015–2017	282 hp (210 kW) at 6,500 rpm	253 lb⋅ft (343 N⋅m) at 4,000 rpm	8	6-speed 6R80 automatic
2.7 L (164 cu in) EcoBoost Nano twin-turbo V6	2015–2017	325 hp (242 kW) at 5,750 rpm	375 lb⋅ft (508 N⋅m) at 3,000 rpm	P	6-speed 6R80 automatic
2.7 L (166 cu in) EcoBoost Nano twin-turbo V6	2018–2020	325 hp (242 kW) at 5,000 rpm	400 lb⋅ft (542 N⋅m) at 2,750 rpm	P	10-speed 10R80 SelectShift automatic
3.5 L (213 cu in) EcoBoost twin-turbo V6	2015–2016	365 hp (272 kW) at 5,000 rpm	420 lb⋅ft (569 N⋅m) at 2,500 rpm	G	6-speed 6R80 automatic
3.5 L (213 cu in) EcoBoost D35 twin-turbo V6	2017–2020	375 hp (280 kW) at 5,000 rpm	470 lb⋅ft (637 N⋅m) at 3,500 rpm	G (2017–18) 4 (2019–20)	10-speed 10R80 SelectShift automatic
3.5 L (213 cu in) EcoBoost D35 high-output twin-turbo V6	2017–2020	450 hp (336 kW) at 5,000 rpm	510 lb⋅ft (691 N⋅m) at 3,500 rpm	G	10-speed 10R80 SelectShift automatic
5.0 L (302.1 cu in) Coyote V8	2015–2017	385 hp (287 kW) at 5,750 rpm	387 lb⋅ft (525 N⋅m) at 3,850 rpm	F	6-speed 6R80 automatic
5.0 L (307 cu in) Coyote V8	2018–2020	395 hp (295 kW) at 5,750 rpm	400 lb⋅ft (542 N⋅m) at 4,500 rpm	5	10-speed 10R80 SelectShift automatic
3.0 L (183 cu in) Power Stroke turbo-diesel V6	2018–2020	250 hp (186 kW) at 3,250 rpm	440 lb⋅ft (597 N⋅m) at 1,750 rpm	1	10-speed automatic

=== Body ===
In line with its predecessor, the thirteenth-generation F-150 is sold with three cab configurations (two-door regular cab, 2+2 door SuperCab, four-door SuperCrew), with rear-wheel drive or four-wheel drive (4×4). Three bed lengths are available (dependent on cab configuration): 5.5 ft (1.7 m) (SuperCrew, all Raptors), 6.5 ft (2.0 m) (all except Raptor), 8 ft (2.4 m) (regular cab, SuperCab).

The 2015 F-150 marked several design departures from previous F-Series model lines. While the cab design saw largely evolutionary styling changes, the rectangular grille adopted a trapezoidal shape, flanked by C-shaped headlamp units. Using LED headlights for the first time, designers used polycarbonate thermoplastic optics to focus the beams, with one LED for each beam and an orange thermoplastic light pipe (doubling as the turn signal). Coupled with the headlamps, the taillamps adopted LED technology, also housing the blind spot monitor; these systems were not typically included on any truck because the system could not be packaged inside steel bumpers typically found on them. The tailgate was redesigned; along with retaining its fold-out step functionality, it adopted several different styles (dependent on trim).

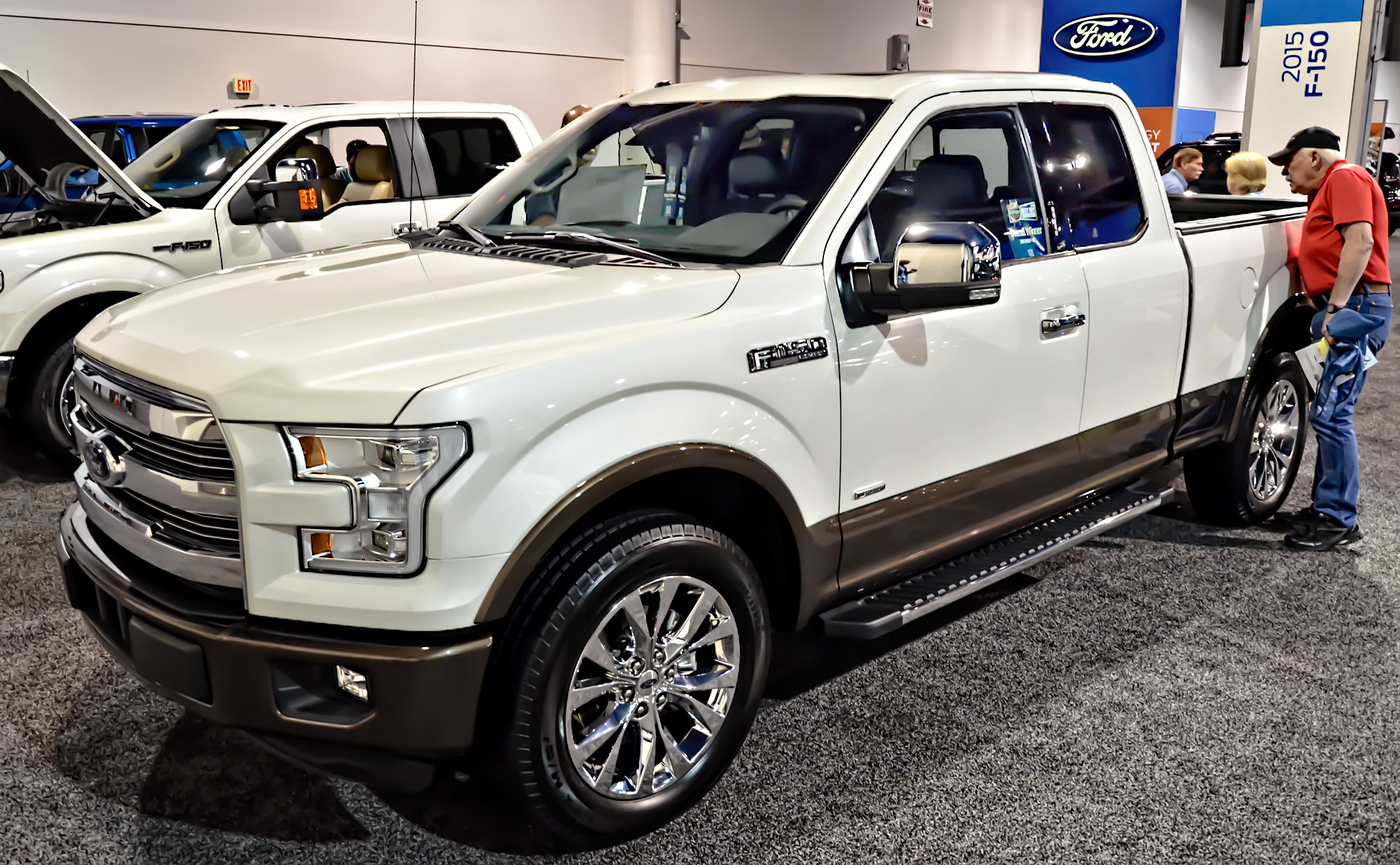
2015 F-150 Lariat SuperCab

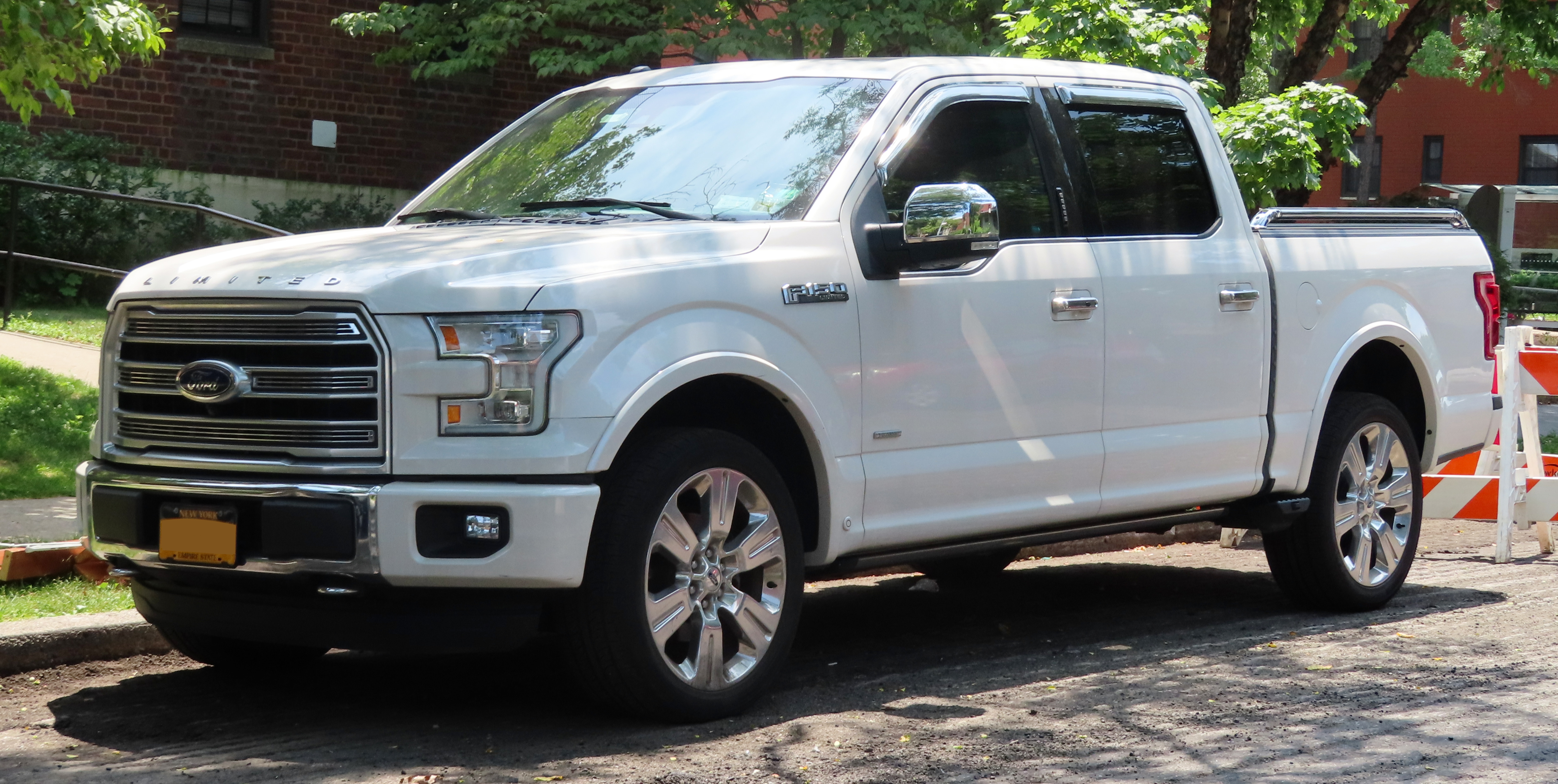
2016 F-150 Limited SuperCrew

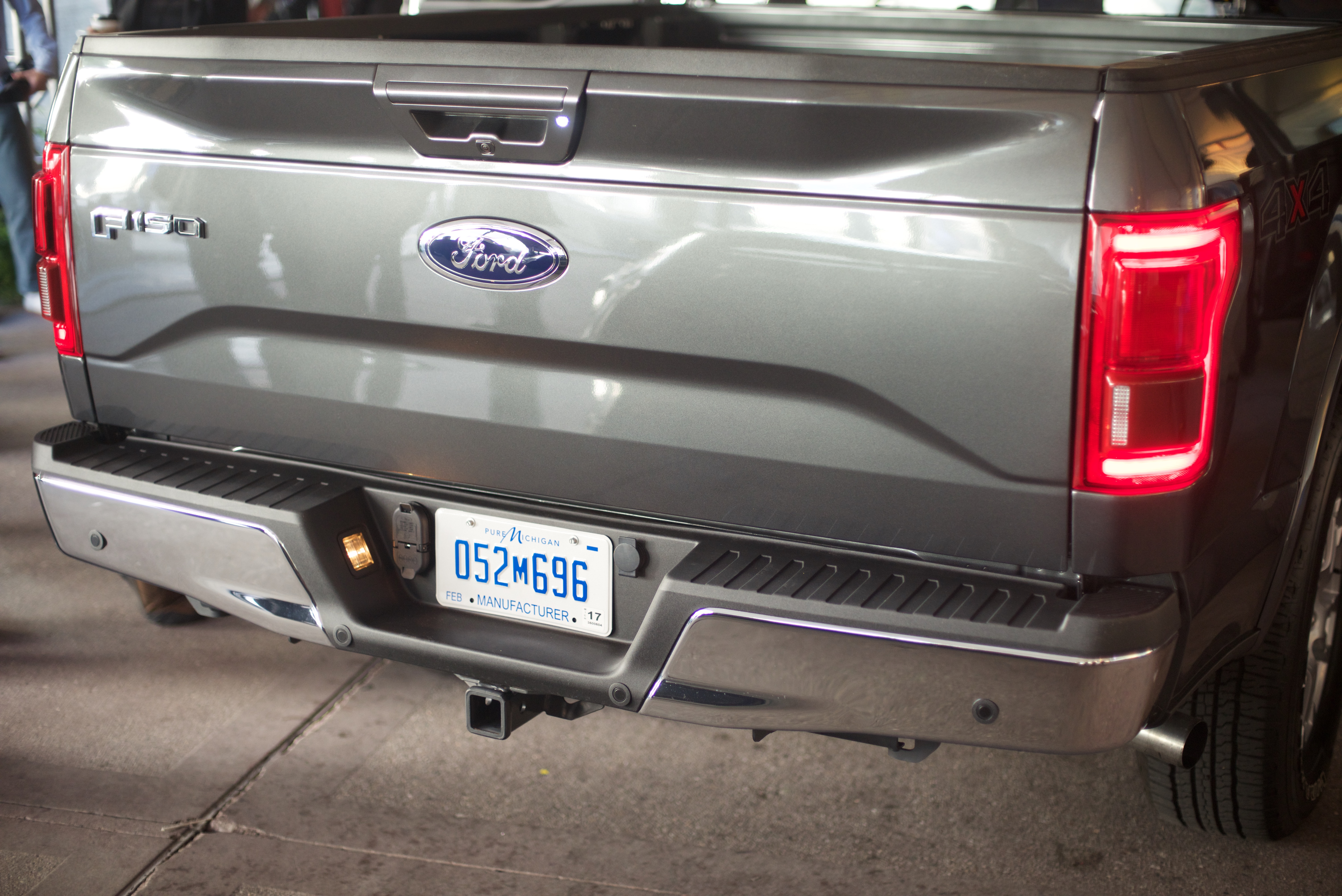
2015–2017 F-150 tailgate

==== 2018 update ====
For 2018, the F-150 underwent a mid-cycle model revision, adopting several design features from the Super Duty model line. The trapezoidal grille was replaced by an octagonal grille; the three-bar styling was replaced by a wide two-bar configuration. The tailgate saw minor changes, with an embossed "F-150" emblem replacing the previous stamped-metal logo; the taillamps saw a minor revision. Several appearance packages were introduced for the XL, XLT, and Lariat trims.

To comply with 2018 Federal Motor Vehicle Safety Standards, all 2018 F-150 models received a standard rearview backup camera.

In comparison to the exterior, the interior of the 2018 F-150 saw fewer visible changes, with most revisions focused on its infotainment systems. Sync was updated to Sync 3; on select models, the system provides remote access, service information, and other vehicle-related information. The premium audio system manufacturer shifted from Sony to Bang & Olufsen, with SiriusXM satellite radio becoming standard for the XLT trim.

For 2019, the top-line Limited trim received the powertrain of the Raptor, with a restyled dual exhaust; the Limited also gained a model-specific Camel Back interior color for 2019.

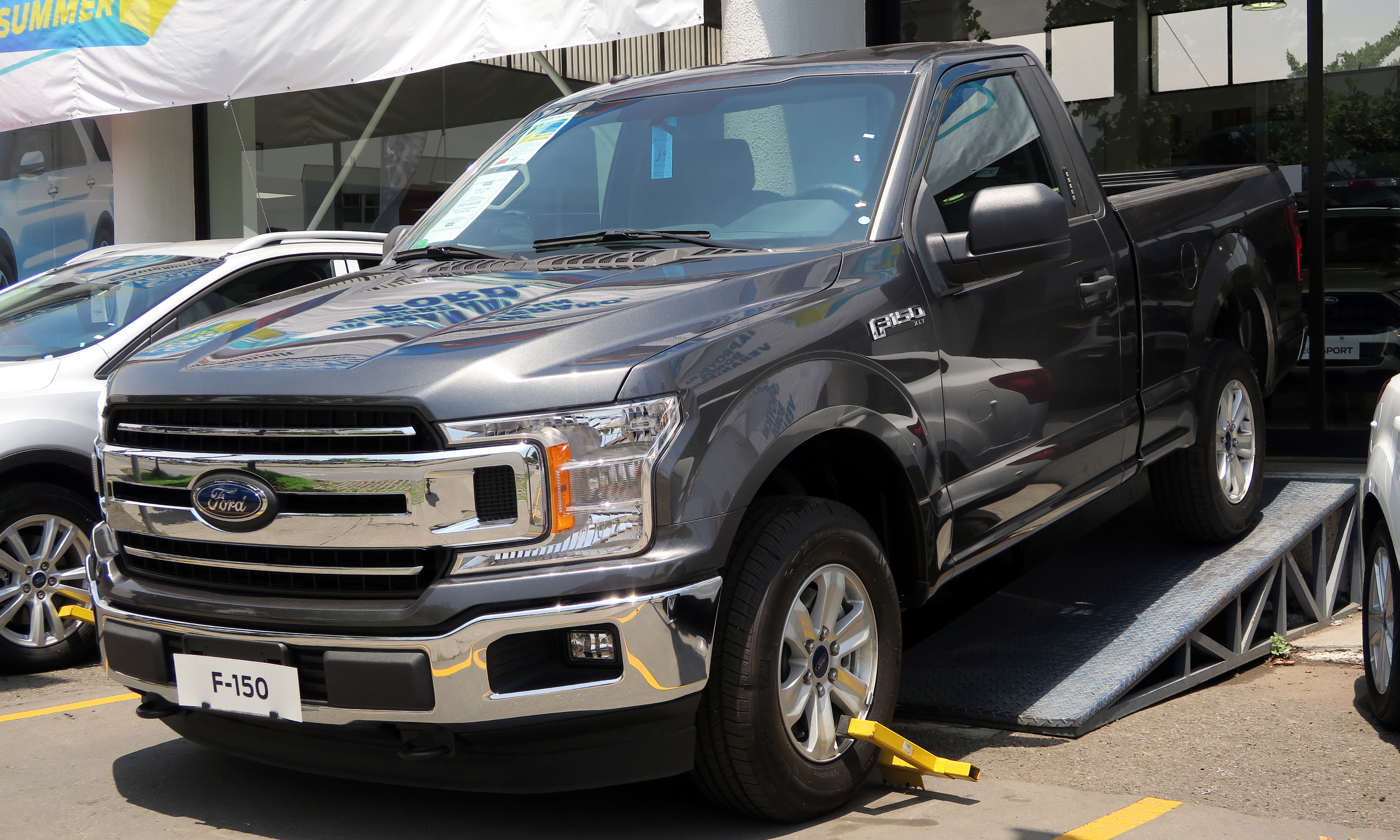
F-150 XLT regular cab

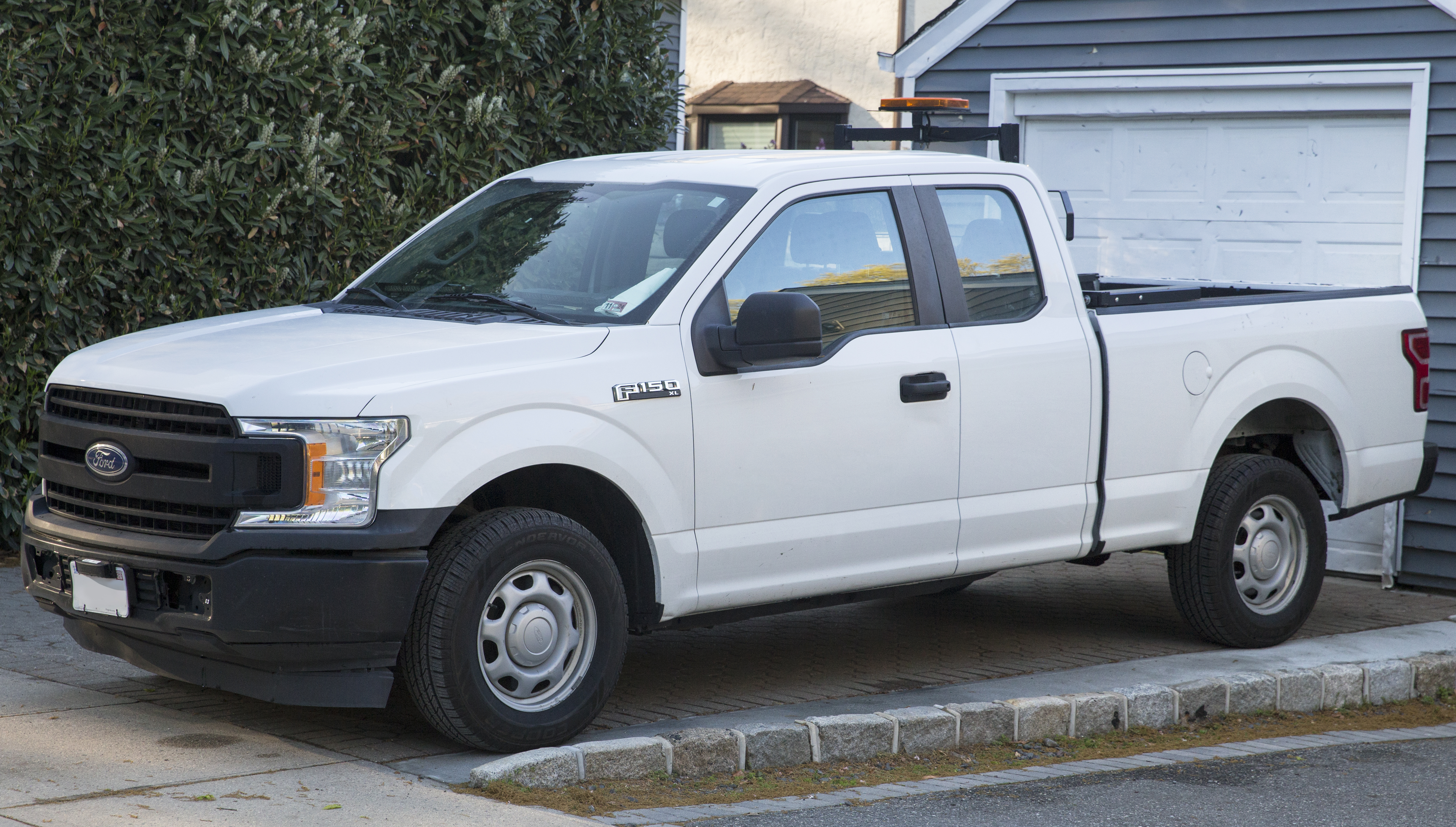
2020 F-150 XL SuperCab

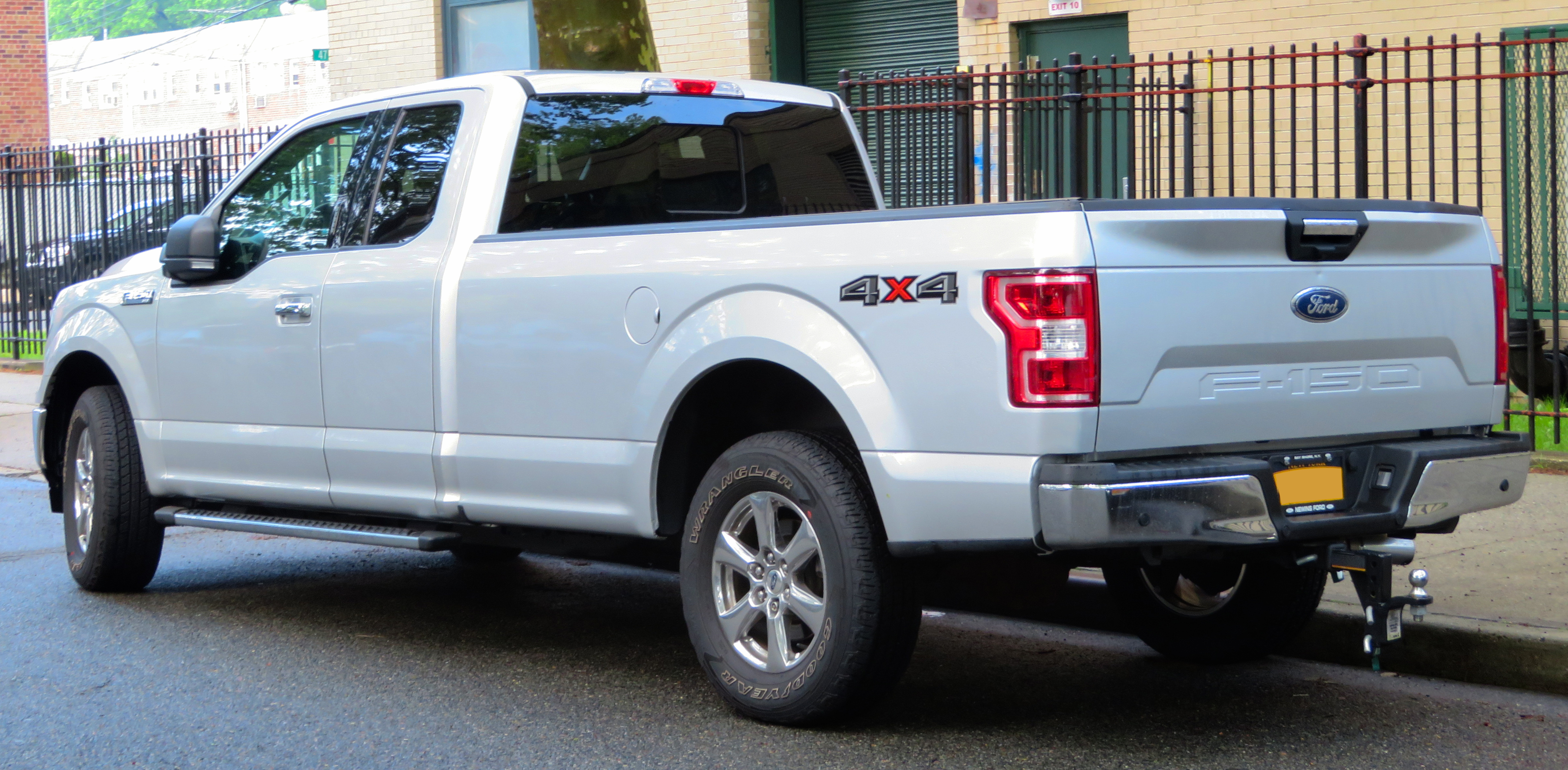
F-150 XLT SuperCab rear, showing new tailgate

== Trim ==
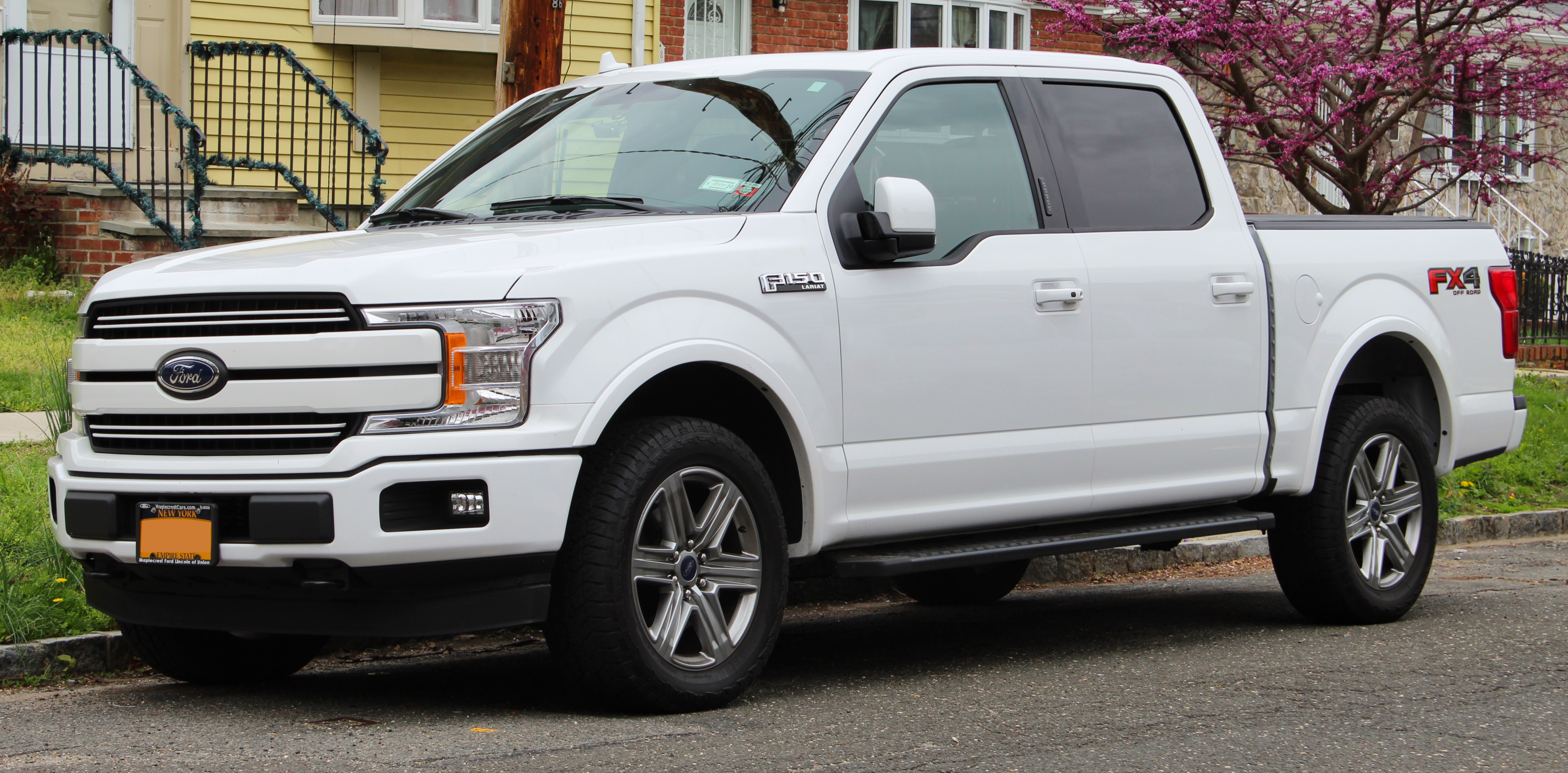

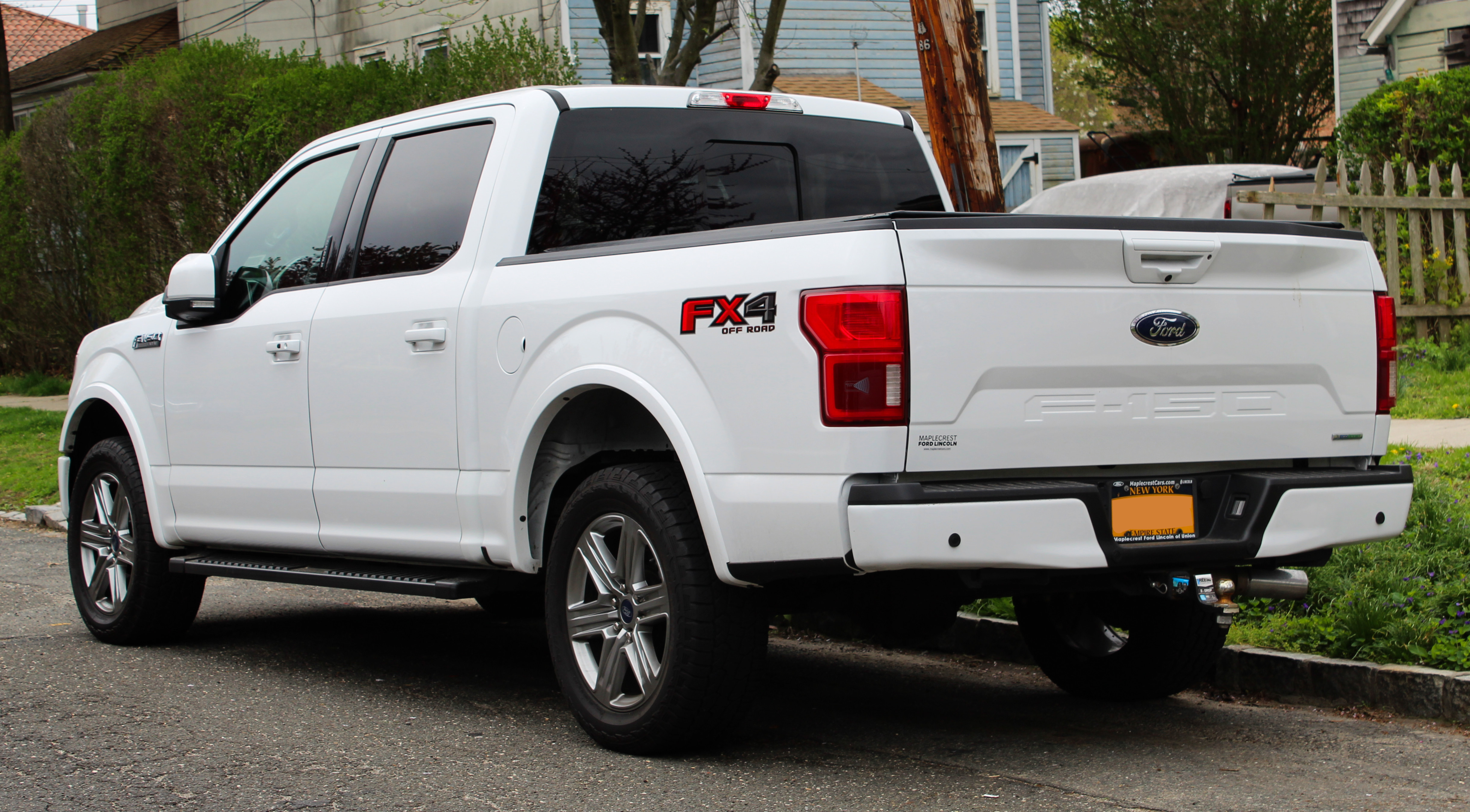
2018 F-150 Lariat SuperCrew FX4 (Sport Appearance Package)

For the 2015 model year, the F-150 model line underwent several revisions, largely to consolidate the number of trim offerings. Most visibly, the Raptor was withdrawn (put on hiatus until 2017 to complete its development), with the Tremor and Harley-Davidson special editions discontinued. The STX, FX2, and FX4 trims were also discontinued as free-standing trim levels (STX became separated again for a 2024 refresh of the fourteenth generation). An STX appearance package became available with the XL trim for 2017, and the suspension features of the FX4 became an option package on all 4×4 trims (except the Limited and Raptor).

The thirteenth-generation F-Series follows traditional Ford truck nomenclature with XL, XLT, and Lariat trims; along with the Super Duty line, the F-150 also has premium King Ranch, Platinum, and Limited trims (the Raptor is exclusive to the F-150). The Limited trim is a dedicated luxury-oriented trim that debuted for model year 2016, coming standard with the 3.5L V6 EcoBoost, 36-gallon fuel tank, 22-inch wheels, power running boards, heated and cooled leather seats, heated steering wheel, genuine wood trim, inflatable rear seat belts, and F-150 Limited emblem on the center console cover with laser-engraved VIN plate.

=== F-150 Raptor ===
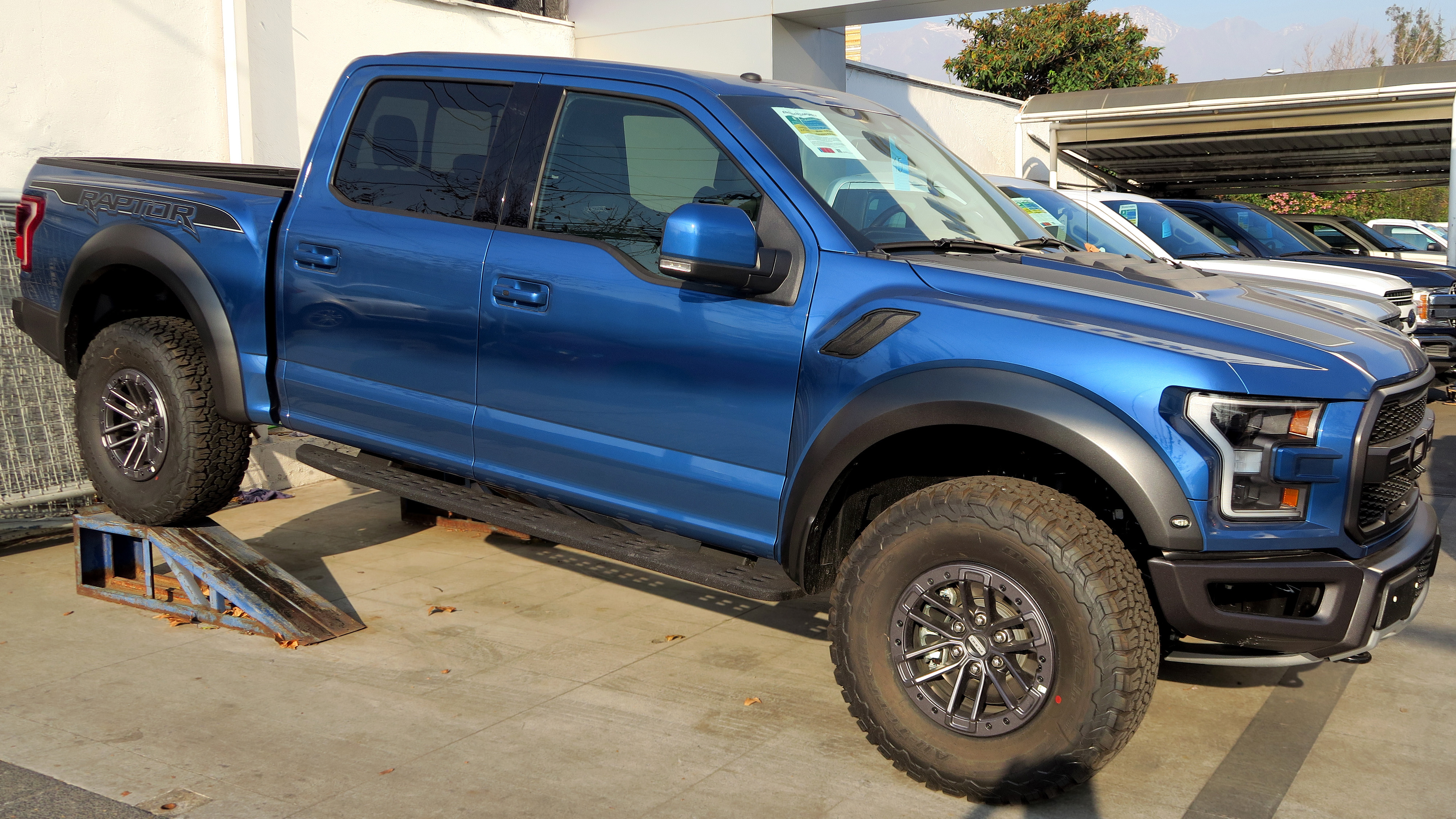
2019 Ford F-150 Raptor

Following a two-year hiatus, the F-150 Raptor sub-model made its return for the 2017 model year, with the loss of its previous SVT prefix. As with its predecessor, the 2017 Raptor is an off-road oriented vehicle produced in SuperCab and SuperCrew configurations with a 5.5-ft bed. The model continues its lack of a Ford Blue Oval grille badge, with "F-O-R-D" spelled across the center of the grille.

As with a standard F-150, the Raptor is an aluminum-intensive vehicle; though built upon a steel frame, nearly all its body panels are built using aluminum (reducing curb weight by nearly 500 lb (227 kg) over an equivalent 2014 SVT Raptor). In place of the 411 hp (306 kW) 6.2L V8, the new Raptor features a 3.5L twin-turbo EcoBoost V6 paired with an industry-first 10-speed automatic transmission. The new engine improves the horsepower by 39 hp (29 kW) to 450 hp (336 kW), and increases the torque from the old engine to 510 lb⋅ft (691 N⋅m) of torque.

To improve its off-road ability over a standard F-150, the Raptor is fitted with a torque-on-demand transfer case, 13 in (33 cm) travel front and 13.9 in (35 cm) travel rear Fox Racing suspension, and all-terrain 35" tires and wheels.

For 2019, the Raptor gets a new Trail Control system, optional Recaro sport bucket seats, and FOX 3.0 Internal Bypass shock absorbers with Live Valve Technology.

== Safety ==
The 2019 F-150 has earned a five-star overall IIHS crash rating.

== Recalls ==
On October 18, 2017, Ford recalled 1.3 million 2015–2017 Ford F-150 and 2017 Ford Super Duty pickups because door latches could freeze in cold climates, causing the door to not open or close properly.

On September 6, 2018, Ford recalled approximately 2 million 2015–2018 Ford F-150 Regular Cab and SuperCrew models worldwide because front seatbelt pre-tensioners can generate excessive sparks and possibly cause a fire in the event of a collision.
