= Lincoln Mark LT =

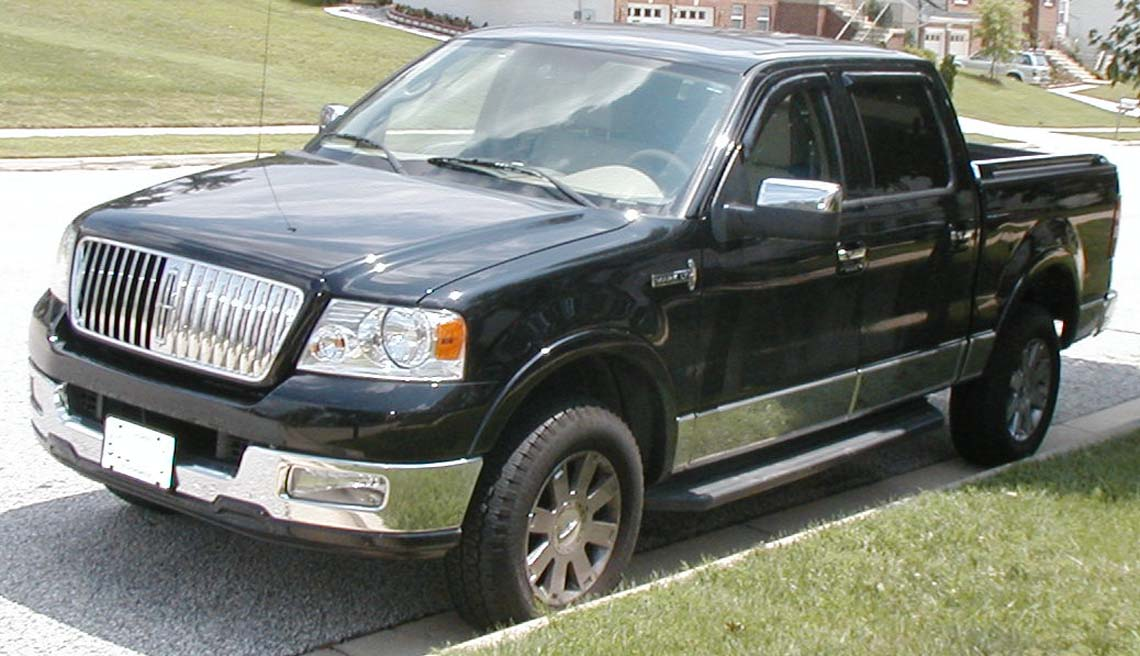
- 2006–2008 Lincoln Mark LT

Overview
- Manufacturer: The Lincoln Motor Company (Ford Motor Company)
- Production: 2005–2008 (United States and Canada); 2005–2014 (Mexico)
- Model years: 2006–2008 (United States and Canada); 2006–2014 (Mexico)
- Assembly: United States: Dearborn, Michigan (Dearborn Truck); Mexico: Cuautitlán (Cuautitlán Assembly)

Body and chassis
- Class: luxury full-size pickup truck
- Body style: 4-door pickup truck
- Layout: Front engine, rear-wheel drive / Four-wheel drive
- Related: Ford Expedition; Ford F-Series; Lincoln Navigator

Chronology
- Predecessor: Lincoln Blackwood
- Successor: Ford F-150 Platinum (U.S. and Canada); Ford Lobo Platinum (Mexico)

The Lincoln Mark LT is a luxury full-size pickup truck manufactured and marketed by Ford's Lincoln division for model years 2006–2008 (U.S. and Canada) and 2006–2014 (Mexico) as a badge engineered, luxury-trimmed variant of the Ford F-150 truck — and a successor to the 2002-only Lincoln Blackwood.

The Mark LT was manufactured at Ford's River Rouge Plant in Dearborn, Michigan, and at the Ford Cuautitlan plant in Cuautitlán, Mexico, on the same lines as the closely related Ford F-150, on which it was based. It used the same 330-cubic-inch, 300 hp (224 kW; 304 PS) 5.4 L Triton V8 and has four doors. The Mark LT also had optional all-wheel drive.

Lincoln projected selling 13,000 Mark LT's annually in the United States. The Mark LT was more successful than the Blackwood in its first year of sales with 10,274 sold in the first calendar year of sales (February 2005 through February 2006). The 2006 Mark LT outsold the Cadillac Escalade EXT, but the 2007 EXT gained on the Mark LT's sales consistently. After disappointing sales, the Mark LT was cancelled in the United States and Canada after the first generation. A second generation was marketed in Mexico where it was often the Lincoln Division's best selling model.

== First generation (2006–2008) ==
First generation
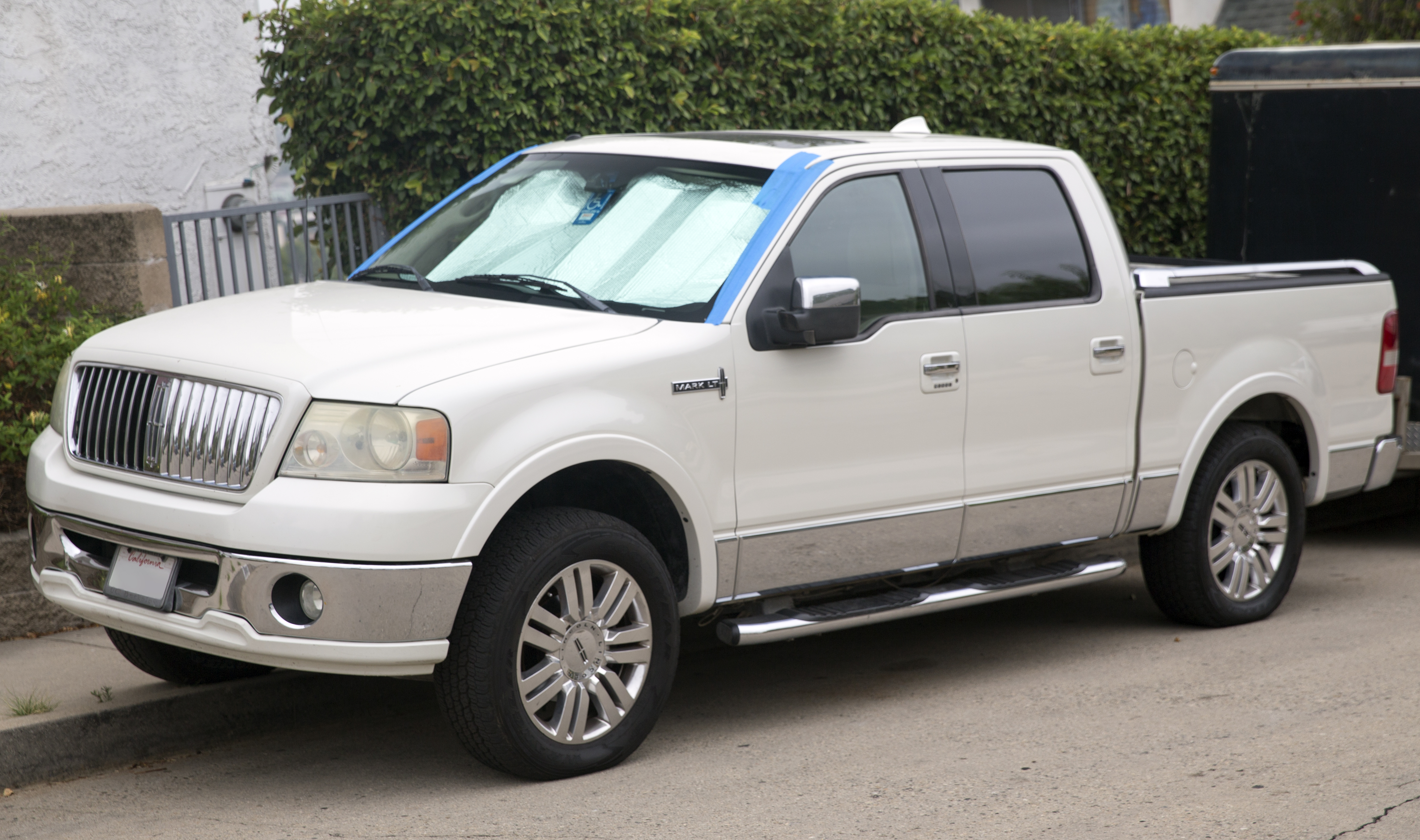

Overview
- Production: 2005–2008
- Model years: 2006–2008

Body and chassis
- Layout: Front engine, rear-wheel drive / Four-wheel drive

Powertrain
- Engine: 5.4 L (330 CID) Triton V8
- Transmission: 4-speed 4R75E automatic

Dimensions
- Wheelbase: 139 in (3,531 mm); 151 in (3,835 mm) (long bed)
- Length: 223.8 in (5,685 mm); 235.8 in (5,989 mm) (long bed)
- Width: 78.9 in (2,004 mm)
- Height: 2WD: 73.5 in (1,867 mm); 4WD 76.0 in (1,930 mm)

For 2007, the Mark LT received a grille facelift, optional DVD-based navigation system and other luxury and cosmetic features. For 2008, the Mark LT received the addition of the color of Light French Silk clearcoat metallic and an optional rearview camera back-up system.

=== Retirement ===
Ford ended sales of the Lincoln Mark LT in the United States and Canada after the 2008 model year. In its place, Ford offered an upper-end trim of the 2009 F-150, marketed as Platinum.

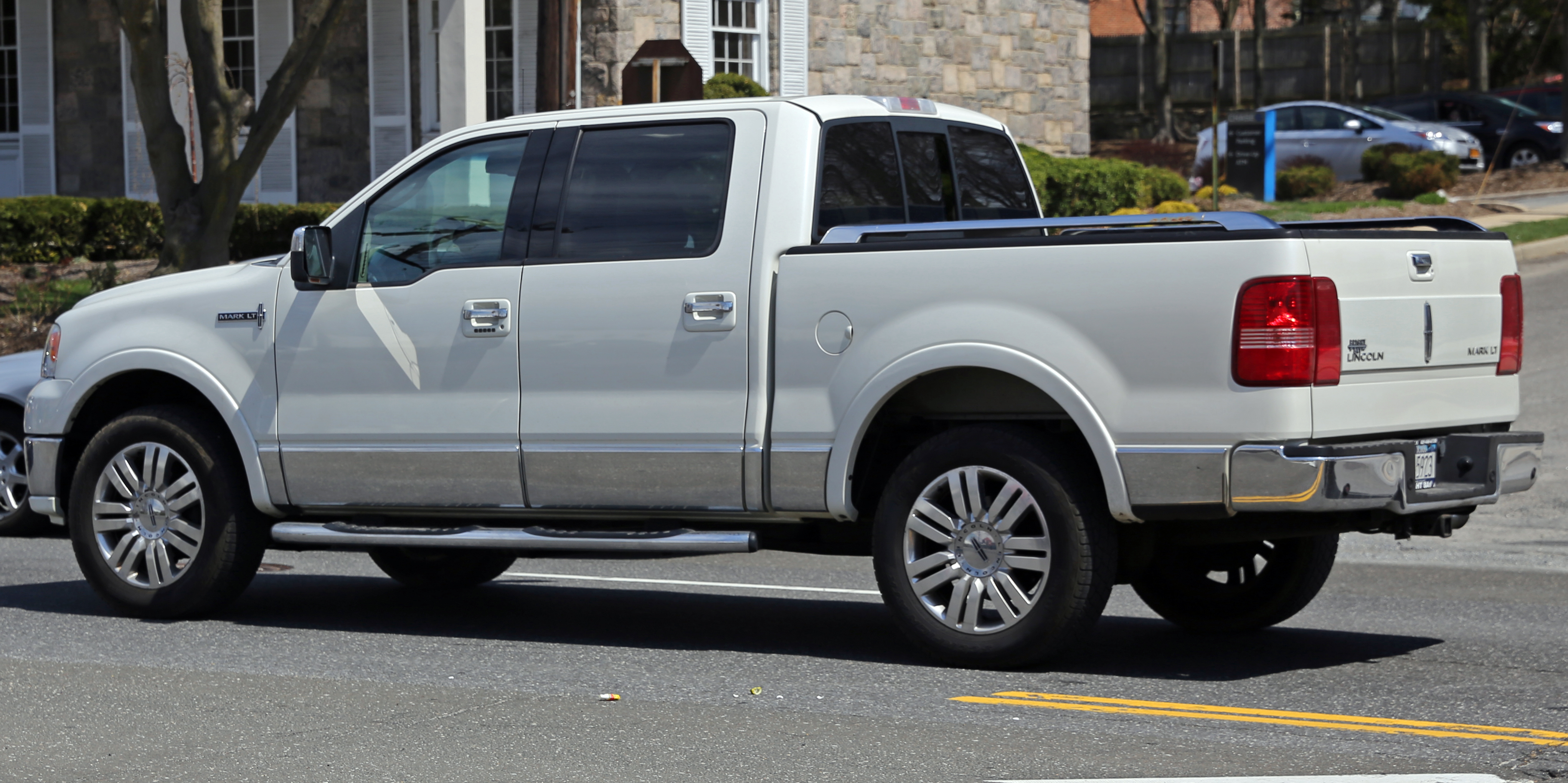
Lincoln Mark LT short bed rear

== Second generation (2010–2014) ==
Second generation
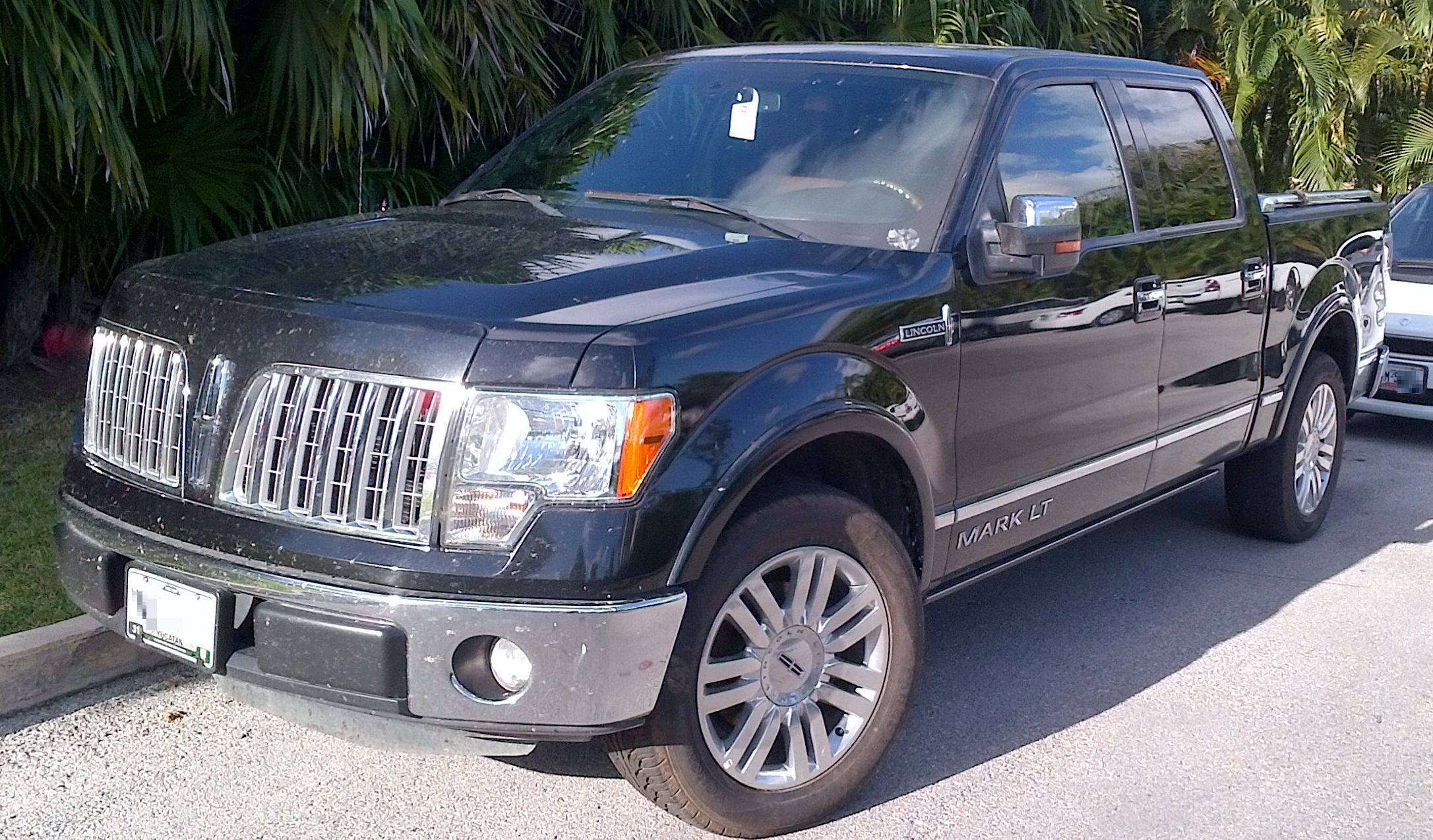

Overview
- Production: 2009–2014
- Model years: 2010–2014

Body and chassis
- Layout: Front engine, rear-wheel drive / Four-wheel drive
- Platform: Ford T platform (T1)

Powertrain
- Engine: 5.0 L (302 cu in) Coyote V8 (2011–2014); 5.4 L (330 CID) Triton V8 (2010)
- Transmission: 6-speed 6R80 automatic

Dimensions
- Wheelbase: 144.6 in (3,673 mm); 156.6 in (3,978 mm) (long bed)
- Length: 231.9 in (5,890 mm); 243.9 in (6,195 mm) (long bed)
- Width: 79.9 in (2,029 mm)
- Height: 2WD: 74.5 in (1,892 mm); 4WD: 76.0 in (1,930 mm)

Although the Mark LT met with poor sales and cancellation in the United States, Lincoln dealers in Mexico found the pickup to become the best-selling model for the division. As a result, Lincoln received an all-new Mark LT for the 2010 model year but only for the Mexican market. Based upon the twelfth generation F-150 introduced a year before, the Mark LT shared its trim with the F-150 Platinum. To differentiate it from the Navigator, the Mark LT was given a split grille in the style of the MKS and MKT.

The Mark LT was built in two versions along with the F-150: the short-bed Dearborn and the long bed Cuautitlán.

With the introduction of the 2015 thirteenth generation F-Series, no Mark LT version was built, making the 2014 model year the last for the Mark LT.

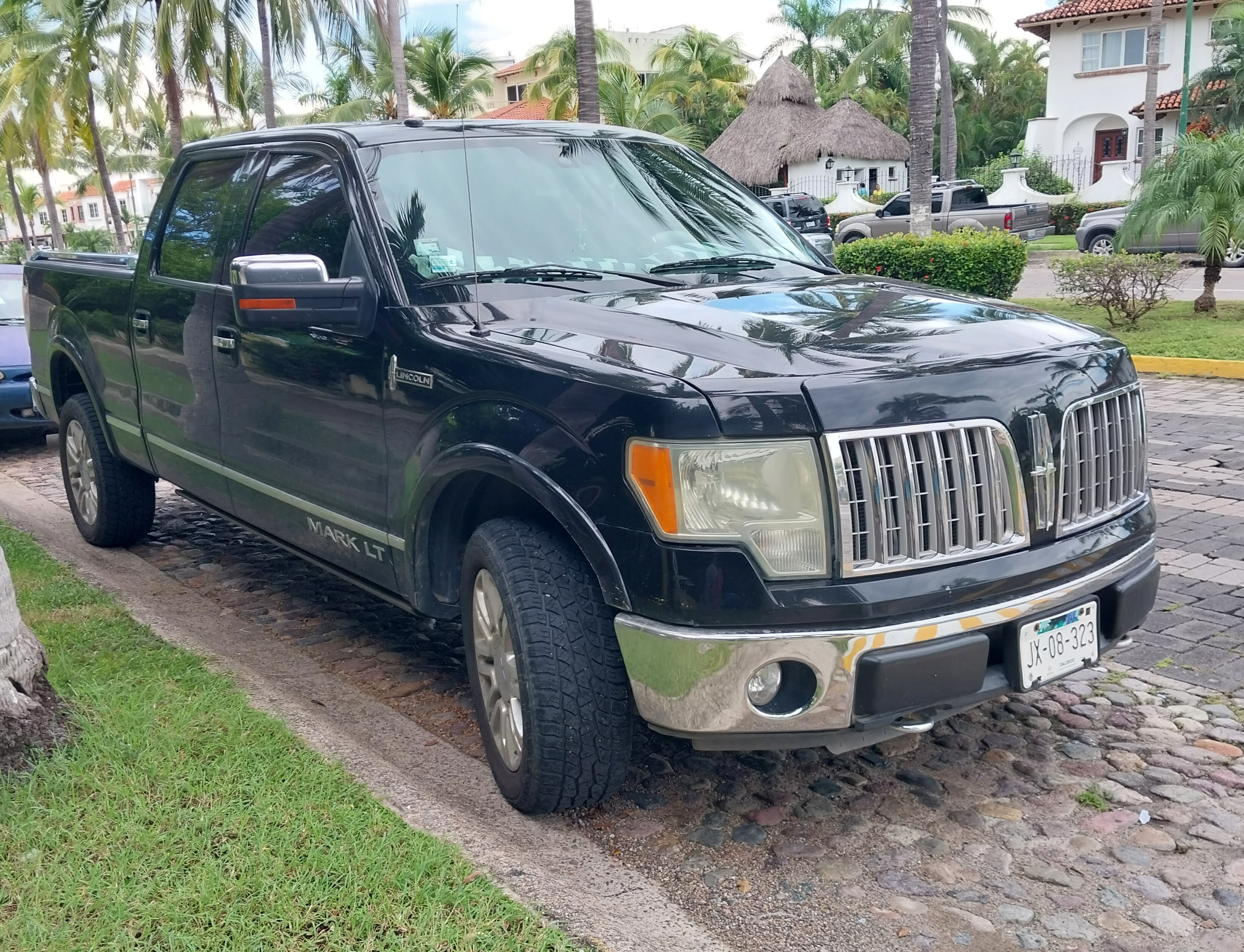
Lincoln Mark LT in Puerto Vallarta, Jalisco

== Quality ==
J.D. Power Quality listed the Mark LT as overall dependability for all 3 years it was manufactured as "among the best" (with a minimum 4 stars for the 2006 variant in initial quality).

== Sales ==
Calendar Year	American sales
2005	10,274
2006	12,753
2007	8,382
2008	4,631
2009	147
