= Ford Super Duty =

Heavy-duty line of trucks manufactured by Ford

Ford Super Duty (F-250/F-350/F-450/F-550/F-600)
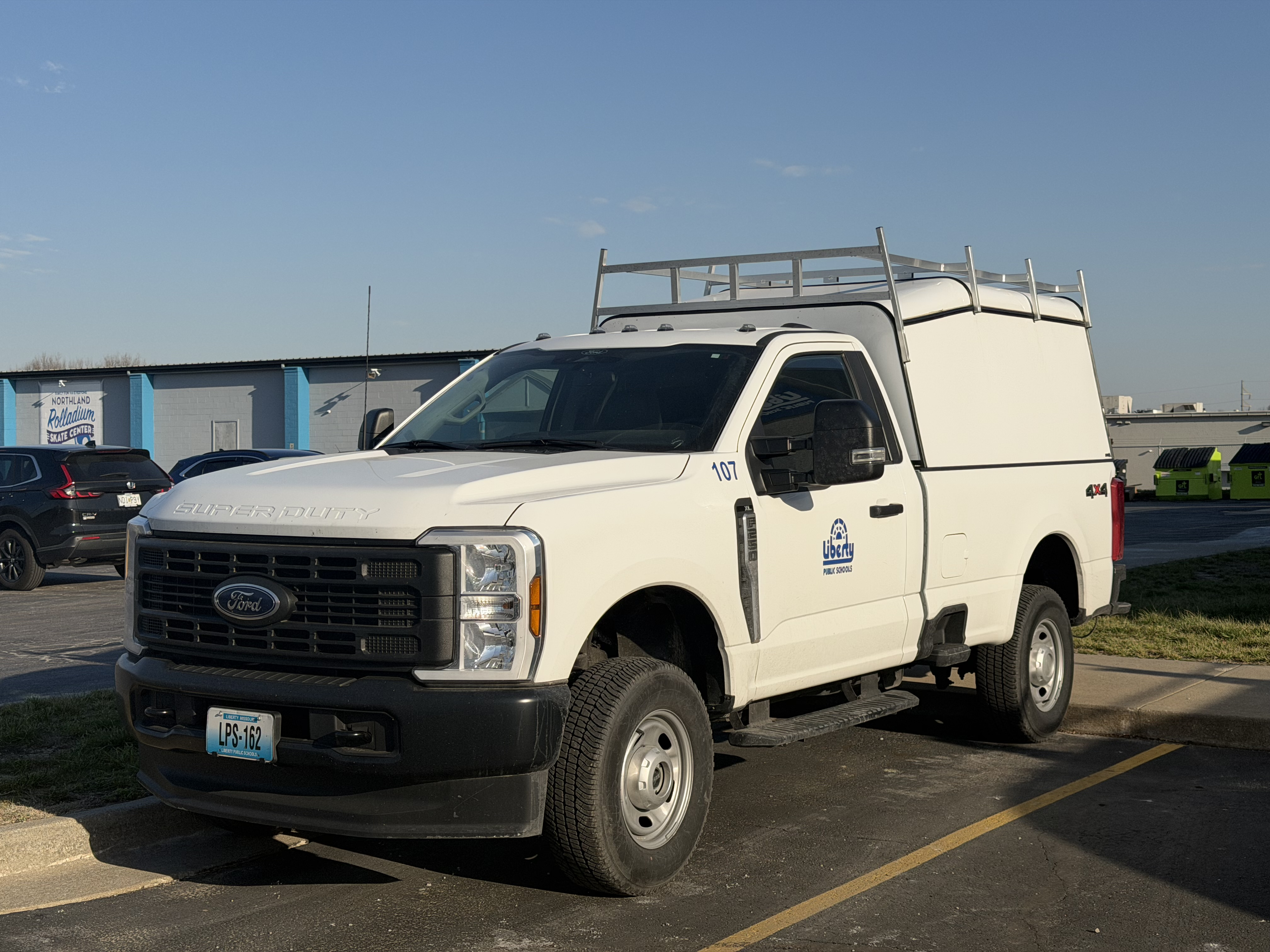
- 2024 Ford F-250

Overview
- Manufacturer: Ford Motor Company
- Production: January 5, 1998 – present
- Model years: 1999–present

Body and chassis
- Class: Heavy-duty pickup truck/chassis cab
- Layout: Front-engine, rear-wheel-drive / four-wheel drive

Chronology
- Predecessor: Ford F-250/F-350/F-Super Duty (1953–1997)

The Ford Super Duty (also known as the Ford F-Series Super Duty) is a series of heavy-duty pickup trucks produced by the Ford Motor Company since the 1999 model year. Slotted above the consumer-oriented Ford F-150, the Super Duty trucks are an expansion of the Ford F-Series range, from F-250 to the F-600. The F-250 through F-450 are offered as pickup trucks, while the F-350 through F-600 are offered as chassis cabs.

Rather than adapting the lighter-duty F-150 truck for heavier use, Super Duty trucks have been designed as a dedicated variant of the Ford F-Series. The heavier-duty chassis components allow for heavier payloads and towing capabilities. With a GVWR over 8,500 lb (3,900 kg), Super Duty pickups are Class 2 and 3 trucks, while chassis-cab trucks are offered in Classes 3, 4, 5, and 6. The model line also offers Ford Power Stroke V8 diesel engines as an option.

Ford also offers a medium-duty version of the F-Series (F-650 and F-750), which is sometimes branded as the Super Duty, but is another chassis variant. The Super Duty pickup truck also served as the basis for the Ford Excursion full-sized SUV.

The Super Duty trucks and chassis-cabs are assembled at the Kentucky Truck Plant in Louisville, Kentucky, and at Ohio Assembly in Avon Lake, Ohio. Prior to 2016, medium-duty trucks were assembled in Mexico under the Blue Diamond Truck joint venture with Navistar International.

== Background ==
=== Previous use of name ===
In 1958, Ford introduced the Super Duty engine family as big-block V8 engines for trucks, offered in 401, 477, and 534 cubic-inch displacements. The 534 is one of the largest gasoline V8 engines ever produced by Ford. The Super Duty engines were some of the largest mass-produced gasoline V8 engines in the world (for highway vehicles).

To showcase the engine launch, the "Big Job" conventional truck variants of the F-Series were rebranded as Super Duty, a name added to other Ford trucks as well. Alongside the Ford C-Series and H-Series cabovers, the N-Series conventional adopted the Super Duty name. Though its poor fuel economy proved uncompetitive against the increasing popularity of diesel engines, the durability of the Super Duty V8 kept the engine in production until 1981.

In 1987, for the 1988 model year, Ford revitalized the name for a Class 4 truck badged as the "F-Super Duty". Manufactured solely as a chassis-cab vehicle, it was slotted between the F-350 and F-600 at the time, and was offered either with a 7.5L gasoline V8 or a 7.3L diesel V8.

=== F-Series change ===
In response to the changing demographics of pickup truck buyers during the 1980s and 1990s, as part of the redesign of the F-Series for the 1997 model year, the model family began a split into two model families, introducing the 1997 Ford F-150 as the first of two distinct F-Series lines. While still functioning as a full-size pickup, the F-150 adopted car-like aerodynamics and convenience features to expand its appeal among consumers. To appeal towards commercial and fleet buyers and owners who tow, the F-250 and F-350 were developed as a separate, dedicated heavy-duty truck platform (in place of using one platform for all of its trucks). By expanding the model line into two separate but related platforms, the inevitable compromises inherent in offering a wide range of load-carrying capacities were avoided.

Prior to the release of the Super Duty series, the previous-generation F-250HD and F-350 carried over for 1997 (alongside a separate F-250 light duty based upon the tenth-generation F-150).

== First generation (1999–2007) ==
First generation (PHN131)
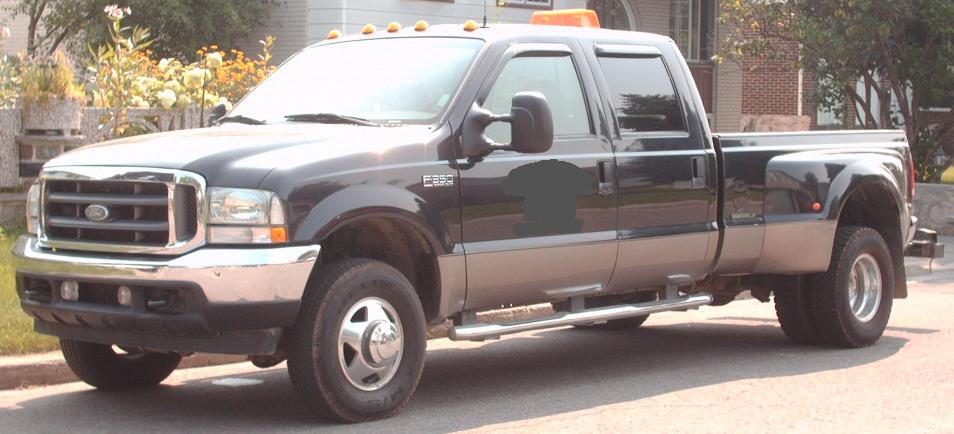
- 2002–2004 Ford F-350 DRW Crew Cab

Overview
- Also called: F-250; F-350; F-450; F-550; F-4000 (Brazil); F-100 (Argentina)
- Production: January 1998 – 2006 (US); 1998–2019 (Brazil)
- Model years: 1999–2007 (US); 1999–2019 (Brazil); 2006–2011 (Argentina)
- Assembly: Louisville, Kentucky, United States (Kentucky Truck Assembly); General Escobedo, Nuevo León, Mexico (F-650/F-750 only) (Blue Diamond Truck); Cuautitlán Izcalli, State of Mexico, Mexico (Cuautitlán Assembly); Valencia, Carabobo, Venezuela (Valencia Assembly); São Bernardo do Campo, São Paulo, Brazil (Ford Brazil)
- Designer: Andrew Jacobson (1994); Moray Callum (1995)

Body and chassis
- Body style: 2-door regular cab 4-door extended cab (SuperCab); 4-door crew cab
- Related: Ford Excursion; Ford F-150

Powertrain
- Engine: Gasoline: 4.2 L Essex V6 engine (Brazil, F-250 only); 5.4 L Triton V8; 6.8 L Triton V10; Diesel: 1999–2003.5: 7.3 L Power Stroke V8; 2003.5–2007: 6.0 L Power Stroke V8; 4.2 L MWM Sprint 6.07 TCA straight-6 turbodiesel (Brazil, F-250 only, available in LHD versions sold in South America and RHD versions exported to Australia, South Africa, United Kingdom, etc.); 3.9 L Cummins B-series (South America); 2.8 L Cummins ISF2.8 (Brazil, F-350/F-4000 since 2014)
- Transmission: 5-speed ZF S5-420 manual (Brazil); 5-speed ZF S5-47 manual; 6-speed ZF S6-650l manual; 4-speed 4R100 automatic; 5-speed 5R110W automatic

Dimensions
- Wheelbase: 137 in (3,480 mm); 141.8 in (3,602 mm); 158 in (4,013 mm); 156.2 in (3,967 mm); 172.4 in (4,379 mm)
- Length: 1999–2000: 222.2 in (5,644 mm) (Regular Cab, Long Bed); 227 in (5,766 mm) (Ext Cab, Short Bed); 243.2 in (6,177 mm) (Ext Cab, Long Bed); 241.4 in (6,132 mm) (Crew Cab, Short Bed); 1999–00: 257.6 in (6,543 mm) (Crew Cab, Long Bed); 2002–04: 262 in (6,655 mm); 2005–07: 261.8 in (6,650 mm)
- Width: SRW: 79.9 in (2,029 mm); DRW: 95.5 in (2,426 mm)
- Height: 76.2–81.8 in (1,935–2,078 mm)

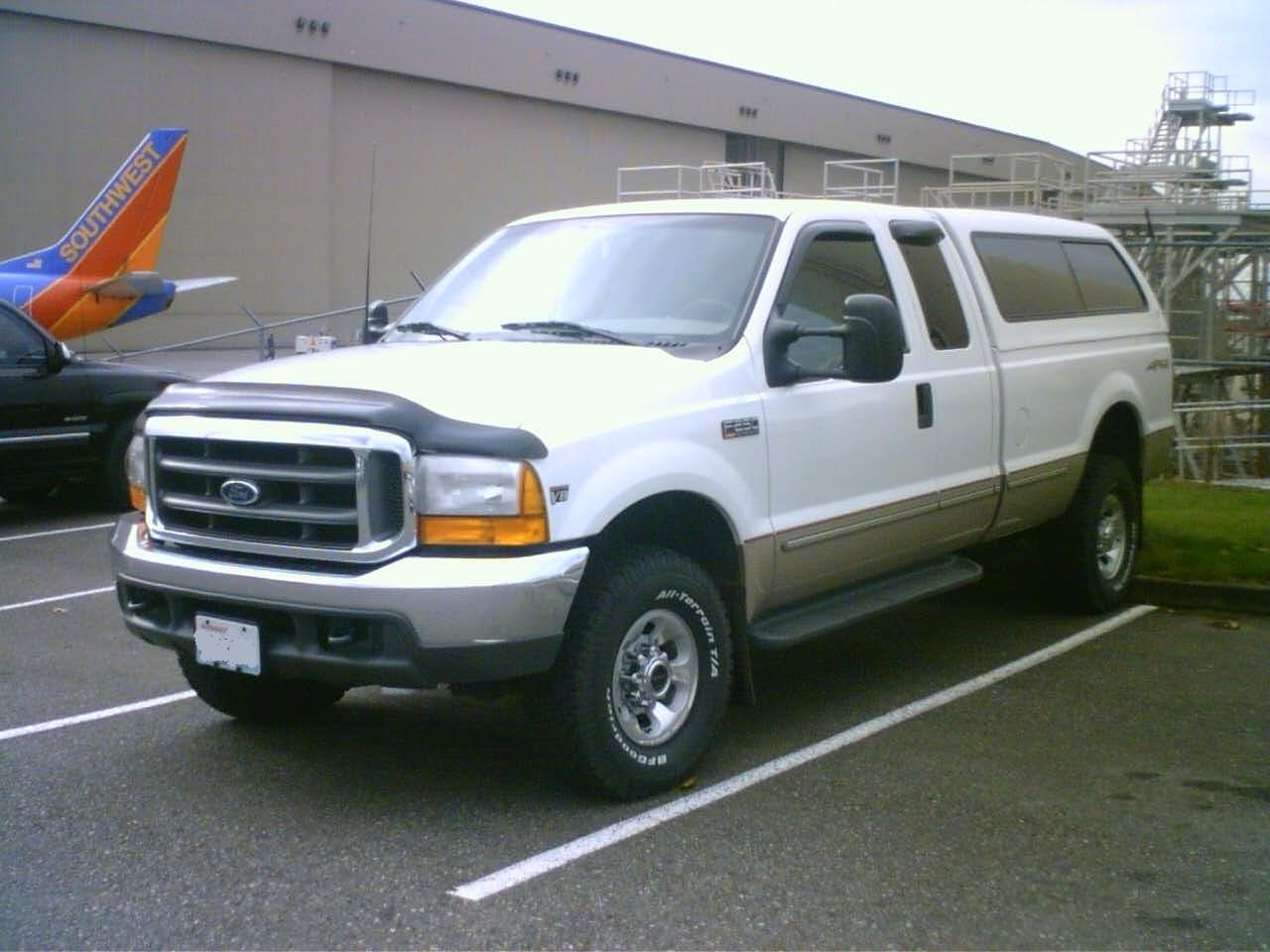
1999–2001 Ford F-250 SuperCab

Based on the 1997 Powerforce concept, beginning production in January 1998 for the 1999 model year (after a 1998 hiatus), the Ford F-Series Super Duty consisted of the F-250 pickup truck, F-350 pickup truck and chassis cab, and introduced the F-450 and F-550 chassis-cabs (see below). The Super Duty trucks were produced with three cab configurations—a two-door regular cab, 2+2 door SuperCab, and four-door crew cab. The SuperCab configuration of the Super Duty marked the introduction of two standard rear-hinged doors on the extended cab, a feature also adopted by the F-150 and Ranger/Mazda B-Series for 1999. The regular cab pickup was produced with an 8-foot bed; SuperCab and crew cabs were produced with a 6 3/4-foot bed, with an 8-foot bed optional. Chassis cab models came with more and different bed length and wheelbase options, but with the same cabs. Two-wheel drive was standard, with four-wheel drive as an option; on F-350 pickup trucks, DRW models with four-wheel-drive became available for the first time. Unlike the F-150, while the SuperCab name was carried over, the Super Duty trucks did not even adopt SuperCrew at all (even after 2016; third generation).

Styled by Andrew Jacobson (designer of the 1997 F-150) and Moray Callum, aside from taillamp lenses and the tailgate, the Super Duty shared no visible parts with the F-150, even the interior itself. But on the powertrain side, only the base-equipment 5.4-liter V8 and 4R100 transmission were shared. Also sharing the similar aerodynamic cab design of its smaller counterpart, the exteriors of the Super Duty trucks are much different forward of the windshield. While the front-end styling is an influence often compared to the second-generation Dodge Ram, the Super Duty also derives elements of styling from much larger Ford trucks, including the Ford LTL-9000 and Aeromax, with a raised hood line, large grille, and low fenders. A feature drawn from 1996 redesign of the Louisville/Aeromax was in the design of the side window openings; the front portion is lowered, allowing for increased side visibility (as well as larger side-view mirrors). To improve aerodynamics over metal-framed mirrors, manual-telescoping trailer-tow mirrors were available as an option. As an industry first, two large, complete, ring-style front tow hooks were included. A minor update occurred in the 2002 model year, which received a new instrument cluster with a digital odometer more similar to that of the updated 1999 F-150, in addition to a new headlight design. For 2004, Crew Cab models gained headrests on the rear outboard seating positions.

=== 2005 update ===
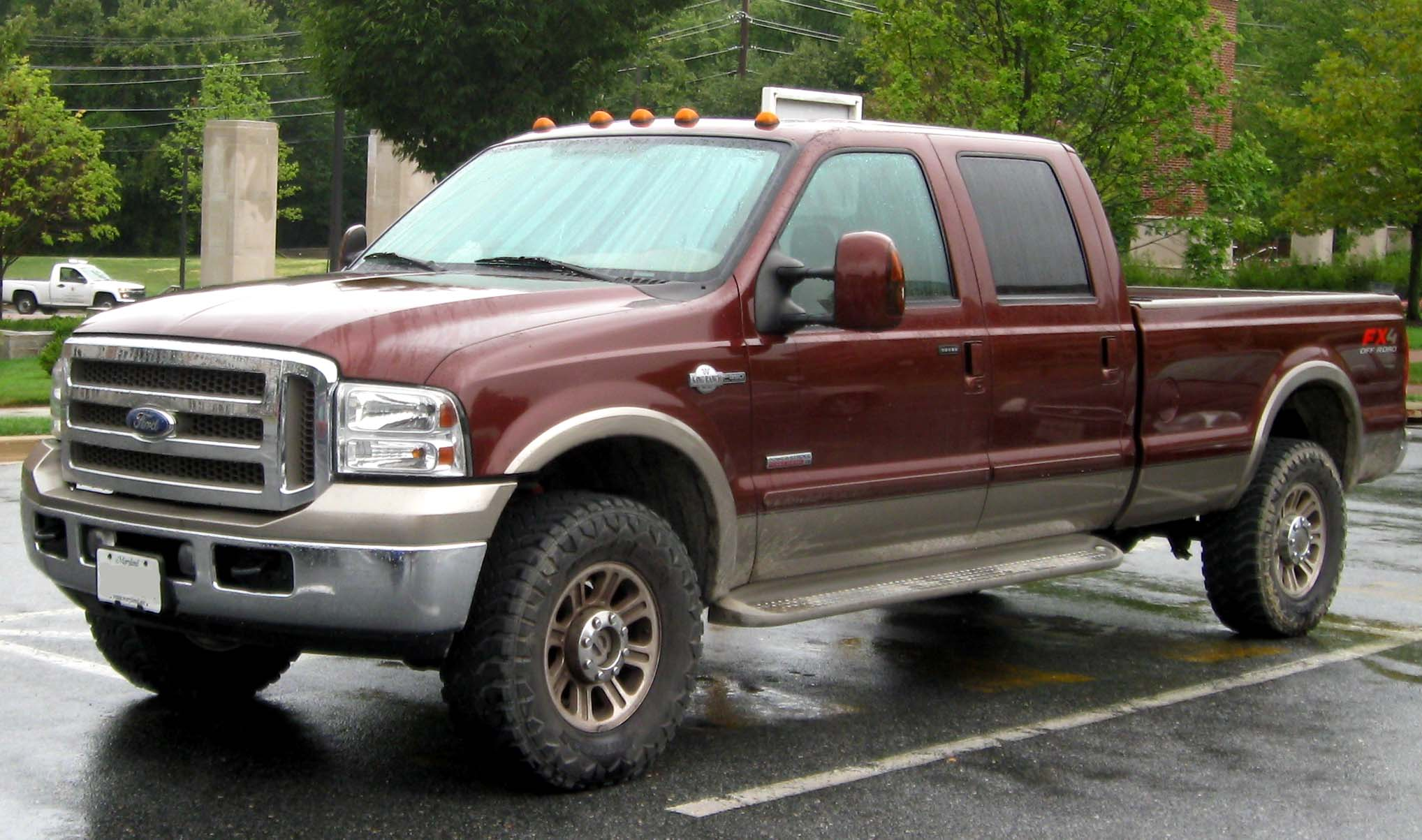
2005–2007 Ford F-350 King Ranch crew cab

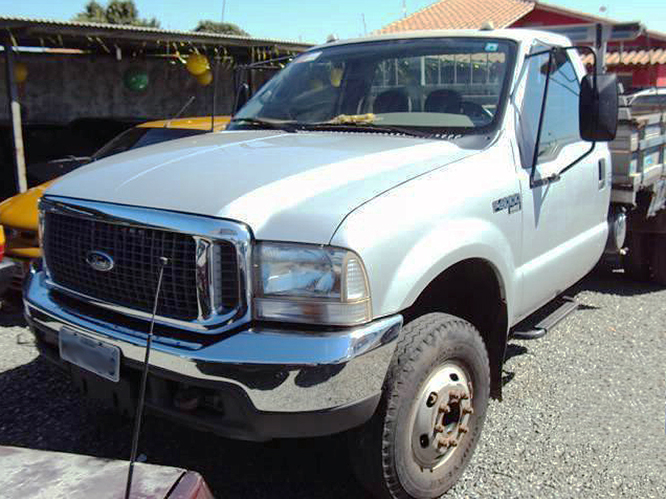
Ford F-4000 in Brazil

For the 2005 model year, the Ford Super Duty trucks were given more minor exterior and interior updates. For the exterior, a new grille (inspired by the Ford Mighty F-350 Tonka concept), front bumper, and headlights were introduced alongside the introduction of a locking tailgate for all pickup trucks. Under the skin (with thicker frame rails), updated Triton gasoline engines were introduced with higher engine output and larger alternators; in response to the increased power, all trucks were given four-wheel disc brakes (with two-piston calipers). To accommodate the larger brakes, 17-inch wheels became standard, with 18-inch wheels optional (on single rear-wheel trucks); forged Alcoa wheels were an option. The long-running Twin I-Beam front suspension continued on two-wheel drive trucks. The 5R110 five speed automatic transmission, once exclusive to the 6.0 Powerstroke turbo diesel powertrain, became available with the 5.4 and 6.8 Triton Gasoline engines, replacing the four speed 4R100.

To the interior, several changes were made to improve functionality for end users. Along with the addition of a driver-side glove compartment, the truck added the option of dashboard-mounted auxiliary switches (for owners who fit equipment such as snowplows, winches, and auxiliary lights); these are switches that were typically user designed. For users who tow, a new option was Ford TowCommand, a trailer brake controller built into the dashboard, allowing it to integrate with the ABS system and engine computer from the factory.

=== Mechanical details ===
During its production, the first-generation Ford F-Series Super Duty was sold with two gasoline and two diesel engine options.

==== Gasoline engines ====
Replacing the overhead-valve engines used in previous F-Series models, for the Super Duty, Ford transitioned to the Triton overhead-cam engine family (truck versions of the Ford Modular engines).

At its launch, the standard engine in the Super Duty was the 5.4L Triton V8. Producing 255 hp (190 kW; 259 PS) and 350 lb⋅ft (475 N⋅m) of torque, the SOHC 16-valve V8 was shared with the F-150 and Ford E-Series. During 1999, the engine was retuned to 260 horsepower (194 kW; 264 PS). For 2005, the cylinder heads were redesigned with three valves per cylinder, converting it to a 24-valve V8 with variable camshaft timing (VCT); output was increased to 300 hp (224 kW; 304 PS) and 365 lb⋅ft (495 N⋅m) of torque. The 5.4L V8 was only offered on the F-250, F-350 SRW, F-350 DRW pickup (except crew cab), and F-350 DRW chassis-cab (regular cab only).

As a replacement for the long-running 7.5L/460 V8, for the Super Duty, Ford introduced an all-new Triton V10 (to rival Dodge's 8.0L Magnum V10). A SOHC 20-valve engine, the V10 produced 310 hp (231 kW; 314 PS) and 425 lb⋅ft (576 N⋅m) of torque. In 2005, the V10 also received three-valve-per-cylinder non-VCT heads, increasing its output to 362 hp (270 kW; 367 PS) and 457 lb⋅ft (620 N⋅m) of torque.

Both the V8 and V10 Triton engines are designed with a fail-safe cooling system to protect the engine in case of major coolant loss. If the engine overheats, the engine will continue to operate on half of its cylinders. Alternating back and forth between each set of four (or five) pistons, the set that is not receiving fuel and ignition is operating to pump air through the engine to lower its temperature. Although engine output is limited, dependent on upon vehicle load, outside temperature, and current road conditions, the system is designed to allow the vehicle to travel a short distance to receive service or to reach a repair facility.

Model	Years	Type	Power, torque
Triton SOHC V8	1999	5.4 L (330 cu in) 16-valve V8	255 hp (190 kW; 259 PS), 350 lb⋅ft (475 N⋅m)
Triton SOHC V8	1999–2004	5.4 L (330 cu in) 16-valve V8	260 hp (194 kW; 264 PS), 350 lb⋅ft (475 N⋅m)
Triton SOHC V8	2005–2007	5.4 L (330 cu in) 24-valve V8	300 hp (224 kW; 304 PS), 365 lb⋅ft (495 N⋅m)
Triton SOHC V10	1999–2004	6.8 L (415 cu in) 20-valve V10	310 hp (231 kW; 314 PS), 425 lb⋅ft (576 N⋅m)
Triton SOHC V10	2005–2007	6.8 L (415 cu in) 30-valve V10	362 hp (270 kW; 367 PS), 457 lb⋅ft (620 N⋅m)

==== Diesel engines ====
Available in all models, the F-Series was sold with optional Power Stroke V8 diesel engines produced under its joint venture with Navistar International.

At its launch, the F-Series Super Duty was sold with the 7.3L Power Stroke V8. Initially producing up to 235 hp/500 lb-ft of torque, the engine was retuned in 2001. Versions equipped with an automatic transmission produced 250 hp, while manual-transmission examples produced 275 hp; with either transmission, the engine produced 525 lb-ft of torque. As the 7.3L V8 was no longer able to comply with noise regulations for diesel engines, it was discontinued midway through the 2003 model year.

As a running change during the 2003 model year, the 6.0L Power Stroke V8 was introduced as the replacement for the previous 7.3L V8 in left-hand drive markets supplied with the American-assembled trucks, while RHD ones supplied from Brazil kept the 7.3L until 2005. As before, the engine continued to be produced by Navistar. A 32-valve pushrod engine, the 6.0L V8 featured a variable-geometry turbocharger. While a smaller-displacement engine than its predecessor, its output is higher than the 7.3L, providing 325 hp (242 kW; 330 PS) and 560 lb⋅ft (759 N⋅m) of torque (in 2005, the torque increased to 570 lb⋅ft (773 N⋅m)). Due to problems with the head bolts, Navistar redesigned the engine with reinforced heads, more torque and power, releasing the new design in 2005–2006. The 6.0L was replaced by the 6.4L as part of the Super Duty redesign for the 2008 model year.

The 6.0L Power Stroke was the target of a class-action lawsuit, alleging the engines were defective. Ford settled the lawsuit with owners and former owners of 6.0L diesel-equipped Super Duty trucks and E-Series vans in 2013, by reimbursing them for the cost of repairs to the exhaust gas recirculation system, fuel injectors, and turbocharger, which were common failure points.

Model	Years	Type	Power, torque at rpm
7.3 L Power Stroke (International T444E)	1999–2003	7.3 L (444 cu in) 16-valve turbocharged diesel V8	1999–2000: 235 hp (175 kW; 238 PS) at 2,600, 500 lb⋅ft (678 N⋅m) at 1,600; 2001–2003 (automatic): 250 hp (186 kW; 253 PS) at 2,700, 525 lb⋅ft (712 N⋅m) at 1,600; 2001–2003 (manual): 275 hp (205 kW; 279 PS) at 2,700, 525 lb⋅ft (712 N⋅m) at 1,600
6.0 L Power Stroke (International VT365)	2003–2007	6.0 L (365 cu in) 32-valve turbocharged diesel V8	2003–2004: 325 hp (242 kW; 330 PS) at 3,300, 560 lb⋅ft (759 N⋅m) at 2,000; 2005–2007: 325 hp (242 kW; 330 PS) at 3,300, 570 lb⋅ft (773 N⋅m) at 2,000

==== Transmissions ====
Four transmissions were available. Several configurations of the ZF5 five-speed manual transmission were offered: small-block pattern, big-block pattern, and diesel. Close-ratio and wide-ratio gearings were available, as well as 4WD and 2WD configurations, with the exception of integrated-driveshaft-brake 2WD versions using the 4×4-style transmission. Earlier S5-42 versions were rated to 420 lb⋅ft (570 N⋅m) of torque, while later S5-47 versions were rated to 470 lb⋅ft (640 N⋅m). ZF six-speed manual for diesel engines. An optional 4R100 four-speed automatic was available for either the gasoline or diesel engines, later being replaced with the TorqShift five-speed automatic. The five-speed automatics are rated at exactly 1,000 lb⋅ft (1,400 N⋅m), enabling higher towing capacity than trucks with the standard five- or six-speed manual transmission. The six-speed manual transmission used an integrated PTO.

===== Torqshift 5R110 =====
The Torqshift five-speed 5R110 automatic transmission replaced the four-speed in the 2003 model year diesel trucks to compete with the Allison 1000 series from General Motors; it was paired with the new 6.0L diesel engine. The TorqShift design, in fact, has six forward ratios, but only five are advertised, with the "hidden" gear only used in extreme cold weather. The TorqShift first to fifth gear ratios are 3.11, 2.22, 1.55, 1.00, and 0.71:1. It also uses an alternate fourth gear, overdrive on second gear of the three-speed automatic component (0.72 × 1.55) (i.e., 1.10:1 that is used under cold start conditions) to assist in engine and transmission warm-up. On the TorqShift, once the Tow/Haul mode is activated, it can help increase a driver's control when towing large loads up and down steep grades and automatically minimizes shifts and maximizes available torque. Upon descent, the Tow/Haul mode uses engine braking to help extend brake life and improve driver control. An adaptive shift function monitors the TorqShift's performance over its lifetime and adjusts shift pressures in real time to assure consistent shift feel and compensate for wear. For ease of maintenance, the TorqShift's oil filter is a cartridge design that is usually mounted on the passenger side behind the front bumper. Also, the TorqShift's larger fluid lines and a larger transmission oil cooler help to assure cooler operating temperatures, even under the most demanding conditions. This was Ford's first automatic transmission to feature a power take-off (PTO). The transmission can be equipped with an integrated PTO provision (which automatically locks the torque converter providing power to the PTO gear when the operator turns on the PTO switch).

===== Transfer case and four-wheel drive =====
On four-wheel-drive (4×4) models, a choice was available of either a manual, chain-driven transfer case floor shifter with manual front locking hubs, or an electronic shift-on-the-fly (a $185 option over the manual) dash knob with vacuum-activated automatic and failsafe manual override front hubs. The optional FX4 models are basically a standard 4WD with an Off-Road package that includes upgraded heavy-duty Rancho shocks, added skid plates for the fuel tank and transfer case, and two "FX4" decals on both back bedsides instead of the standard "4×4". For all 4WD models, the two-speed transfer case 4×4-LOW range has a gear reduction of 2.72:1. Brazilian and Venezuelan versions had only the ESOF transfer case.

Ford Super Duty transmissions
Ford 4R100 4-speed automatic
Gear	1	2	3	4	R		
Ratio	2.71:1	1.54:1	1:1	0.71:1	2.19:1		
Ford 5R110 (TorqShift) 5-speed automatic
Gear	1	2	3	4	5	R	
Ratio	3.11:1	2.22:1	1.55	1:1	0.71:1	2.88:1	
Ford 5-speed manual
Gear	1	2	3	4	5	R	
Ratio	5.72:1	2.94:1	1.61	1:1	0.76:1	5.24:1	
Ratio	4.14:1	xxxx:1	xxxx	1:1	0.76:1	xxxx:1	
Ratio	5.08:1	xxxx:1	xxxx	1:1	0.77:1	xxxx:1	
ZF S6-650 6-speed manual
Gear	L	1	2	3	4	5	R
Ratio	5.79:1	3.30:1	2.10	1.30:1	1:1	0.72:1	5.24:1

==== Suspension ====
For the first-generation Super Duty range, Ford used several different suspension configurations, depending on the model of truck. All pickup models used heavy-duty 3-inch-wide (76.2 mm) leaf springs and staggered shock absorbers. A standard stabilizer bar is included on dual-rear-wheel models and an option on single-rear-wheel versions. An optional slide-in camper certification package with heavier-duty springs was available on single-rear-wheel models. All versions of the Super Duty trucks came equipped with four-wheel disc brakes.

On two-wheel-drive F-250 and F-350 models, the Twin-I-Beam independent front suspension with coil springs was used; their 4×4 counterparts were equipped with solid front axle (Dana 50 and Dana 60) with leaf springs. For 2005, the front suspension was updated as 4×4 trucks were converted to front coil springs; to reduce unsprung weight, the mounting of the front sway bar was changed to the frame instead of the front axle. The manual locking hubs on Super Duty trucks were made by Warn.

The F-250 and F-350 single-rear-wheel versions were fitted with a 10.5-inch (270 mm) Sterling 10.5 35-spline axle with choices of conventional or limited-slip differentials; initially developed for previous-generation Ford trucks, it was strengthened for use in the Super Duty. In dual-rear-wheel F-350s, the rear axle was a Dana 80.

All F-450 and F-550 chassis-cab trucks used a solid front axle, and on 4×4 models, the Dana 60 front axle was replaced with a Dana Super 60 for 2005. The leaf springs were also changed to coil springs for 2005. 2008–2010 and 2015–2018 F-450 pickups used Dana S 110 rear axles, while 2011–2014 F-450 pickups used Dana 80 axles. All F-450 chassis cabs used a Dana S 110, while F-550s used a Dana 135 from 1999 to 2004 and an S 110 from 2005 on.

===== F-250 solid axle =====
The Dana 50 axle featured on most F-250 Super Duty trucks differs greatly from the early models. The Dana 50 started out as a Twin-Traction Beam axle (much like independent suspension) in 1980 and lasted to 1997 models. The Super Duty models then used a solid-axle version of this axle. The ring, pinion, carrier, and universal joints all remained the same, however. The Dana 50 was phased out of the trucks in 2004, in favor of the Dana 60, and was last used in the Ford Excursion.

1999–2004 Ford Super Duty
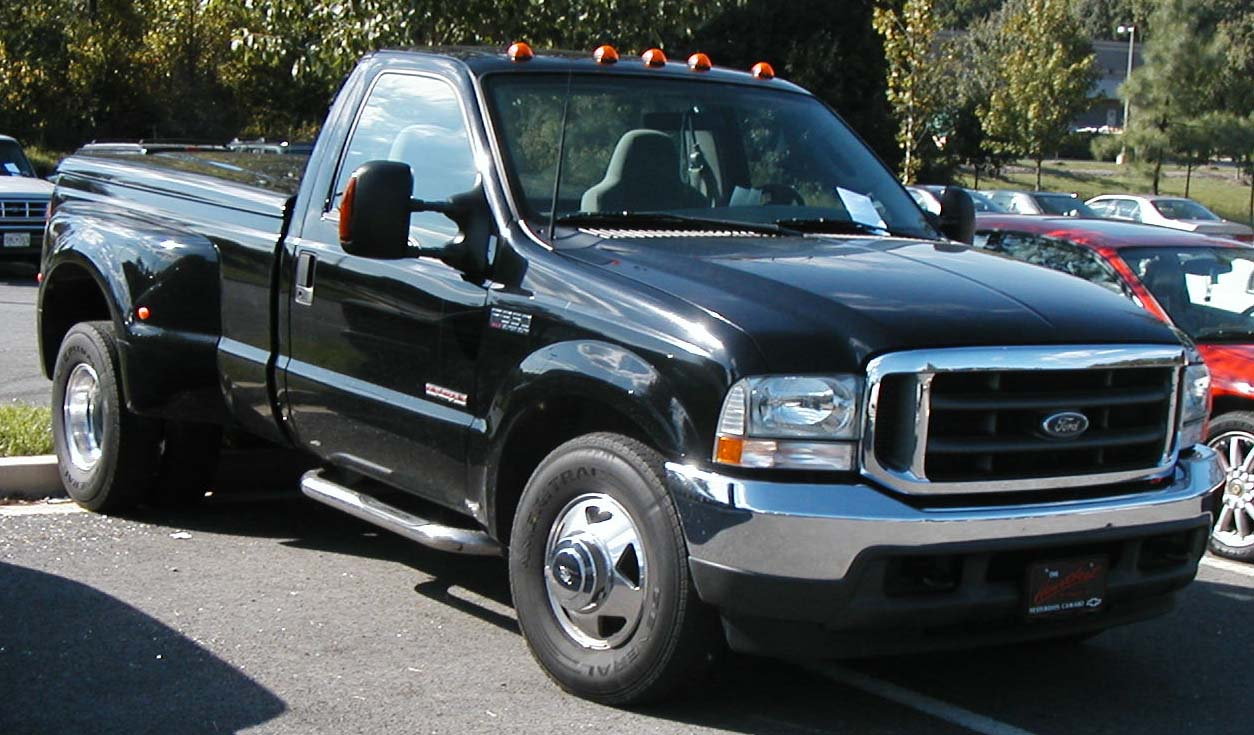
2003–2004 Ford F-350 DRW regular cab

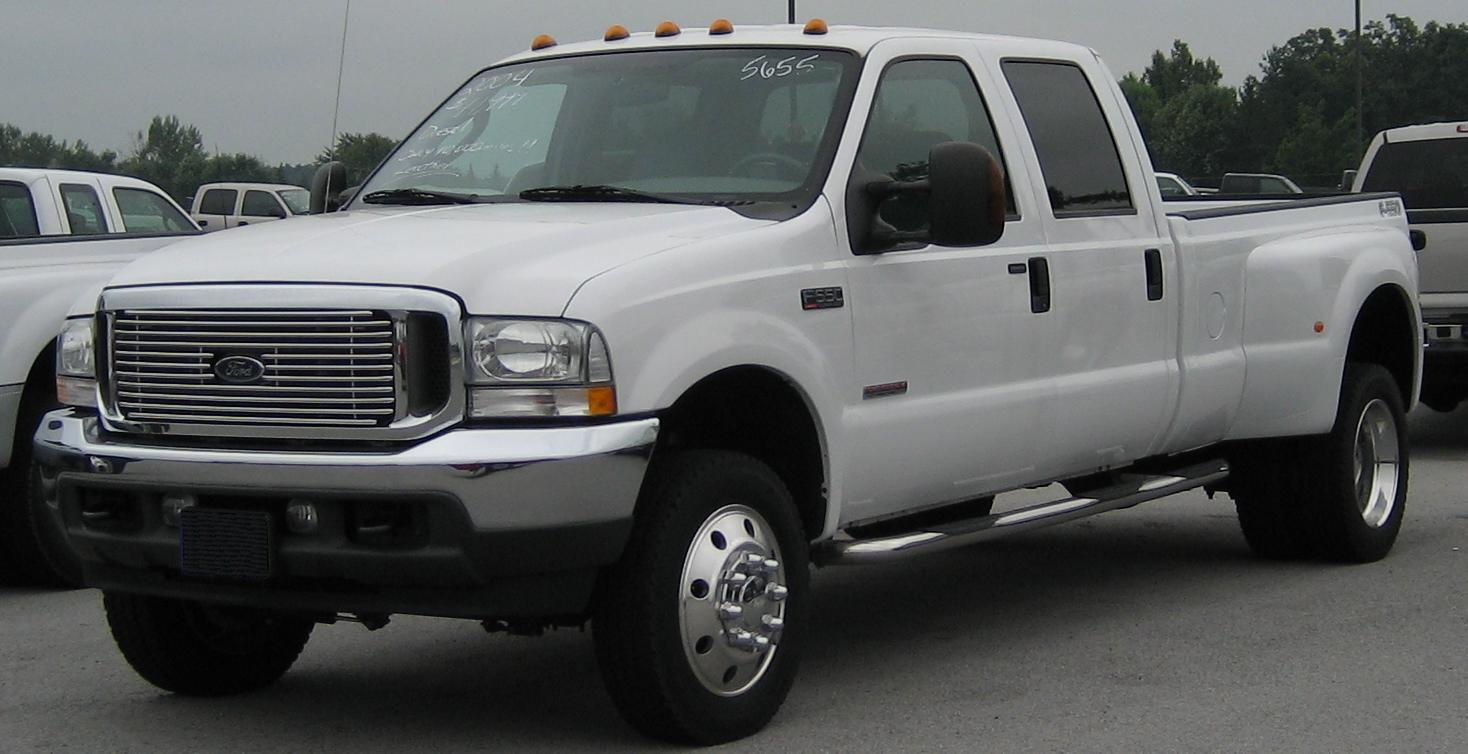
2004 Ford F-550 crew cab (pickup conversion)

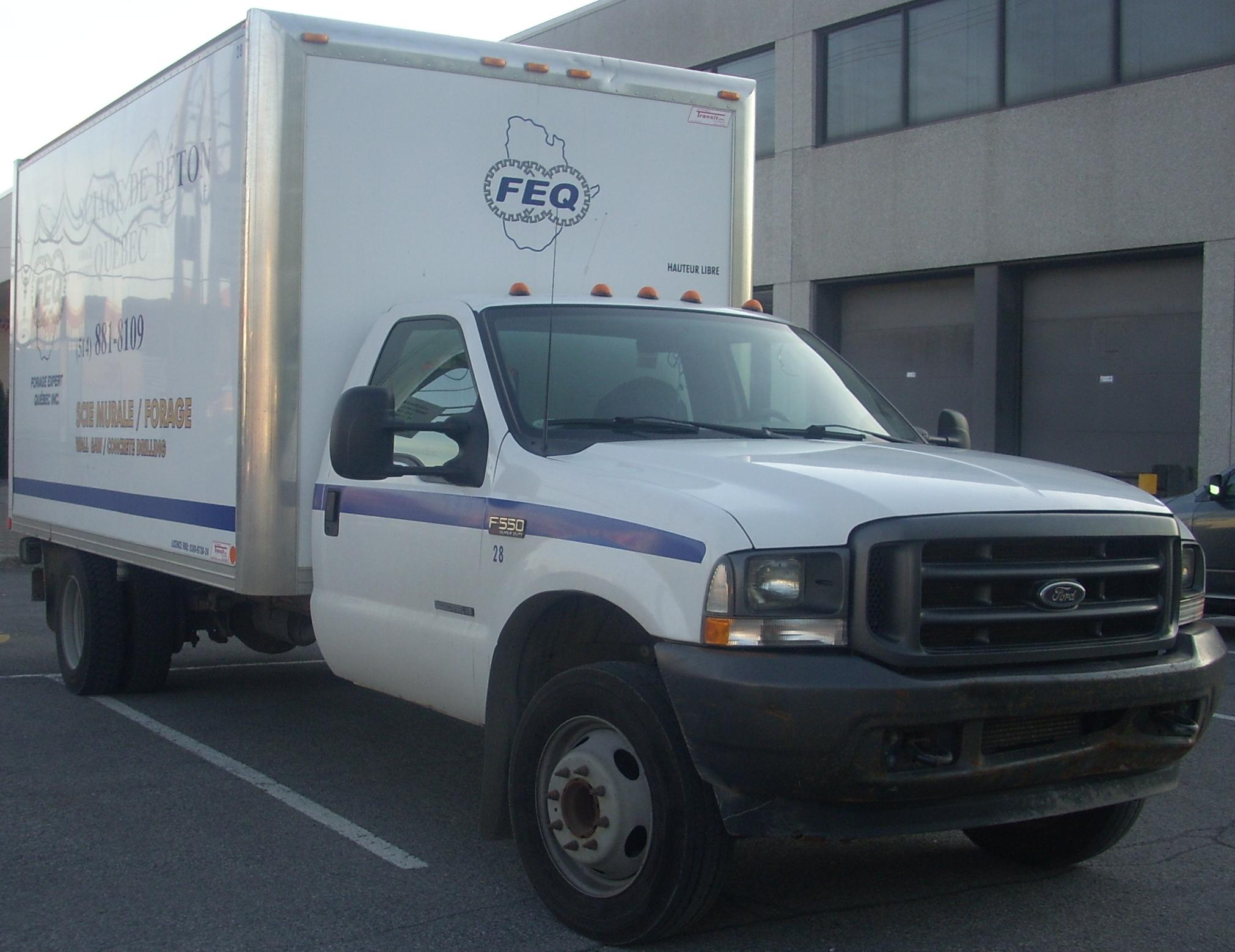
2002–2003 Ford F-550 box truck

=== Trim levels ===
Throughout its production run, the first-generation (1999–2007) Ford F-Series Super Duty was offered in three main trim levels:

The base XL was the "work truck" trim level. Its standard features included a manual transmission, an AM/FM stereo with two front door-mounted speakers, a heater and blower, vinyl-trimmed seating surfaces with bench seats, steel wheels with black center hubs, black front and rear bumpers, a black "egg-crate" front grille, and manual windows and door locks. Optional features that were offered on this trim level included cloth-trimmed seating surfaces or vinyl- and cloth-trimmed seating surfaces, power windows and door locks, an AM/FM stereo with cassette player (later, a single-disc CD player instead of a cassette player) and four speakers, chrome front and rear bumpers as part of an XL Decor Group, an automatic transmission, and air conditioning.

The mid-range XLT was the most popular trim level. It added these features to the base XL trim level: an AM/FM stereo with cassette player (later, a single-disc CD player instead of a cassette player) and four speakers, cloth-trimmed seating surfaces, bright center wheel hubs, chrome front and rear bumpers, a chrome "egg-crate" front grille with black inserts, power windows and door locks (optional for 1999), and air conditioning. Optional features that were offered on this trim level included aluminum wheels, keyless entry (later, this option became standard equipment on this trim level), an AM/FM stereo with both a cassette player and a single-disc CD player (later, a six-disc, in-dash CD changer), an automatic transmission, and a power-adjustable front driver's bench seat.

The top-of-the-line Lariat was the most luxurious trim level. It added these features to the mid-range XLT trim level: an AM/FM stereo with both a cassette player and a single-disc CD player (later, a six-disc, in-dash CD changer), leather-trimmed seating surfaces, chrome-clad (later aluminum) wheels and center wheel hubs, keyless entry, a security system, electronic climate controls, a power front bench seat with fold-down center armrest, wood interior trim panels, and a chrome front grille with chrome inserts. Available options included two-tone exterior paint, color-keyed grille insert as well as front and rear bumpers, bucket seats replacing the bench seat, heated front seats, and an automatic transmission (which later became standard on this trim level).

=== Special editions ===
There were multiple special edition Super Duty models that were offered.

In 2001, to celebrate one million Super Duty trucks produced since their introduction in 1999, Ford released a "Platinum Edition" version of the F-250 Super Duty. Acting as an additional option package for the Lariat model, the Platinum Edition also included a unique two-tone silver paint job, special leather seats, color matched trim pieces and unique "Platinum Edition" badging. Only offered in Crew Cab configuration with a six-foot bed, the Platinum Edition had a limited production run of just one year. The Platinum name would eventually return as a permanent higher end trim level in 2009 for the Ford F-150 and 2013 for the Super Duty.

For 2003, a special Centennial Edition Super Duty was offered to celebrate the 100th anniversary of Ford Motor Company. The truck could be ordered only as a Crew Cab, but a choice of bed lengths, dual or single rear wheels, and gasoline or diesel engines were available. The Centennial Edition offered as standard equipment: monochromatic black clearcoat exterior, premium Verona-grain Imola leather seating finished in two-tone parchment, Special Centennial Edition badging, and a commemorative keychain and wristwatch. The Centennial Edition also came with special leather-bound owner's manual with the embossed signatures of Henry Ford, Edsel Ford, Henry Ford II, and William Clay Ford Jr.

Also in 2003, Ford began to offer its King Ranch trim package to the F-250 and F-350 Super Duty trucks. This package included rich Castaño leather seats, audio and climate controls on the steering wheel, front heated seats, 18-inch aluminum wheels (single) or 17-inch wheels (dual), and an improved instrument panel. It was only available on Crew Cab models.

Ford offered a special Harley-Davidson edition of the Super Duty from 2004 to 2007. It was available only on single-rear-wheel models and was available with a Triton V10 or 6.0L Power Stroke diesel engine. Based upon the Lariat trim, and available in a SuperCab or Crew Cab, the Harley-Davidson edition had a unique black leather interior, with the Bar and Shield logo adorning the front and rear captain's chairs (SuperCab models had a rear bench). Heated seats, a leather-wrapped multifunction steering wheel, power-adjustable pedals, and power-adjustable heated mirrors rounded out the standard equipment. Unique spun-metal gauge faceplates embroidered the carpeted floor mats, and a leather-wrapped console lid with individually serial-numbered badging rounded out unique interior appointments. The 2004 Harleys could be had with three unique paint schemes: Competition Orange/Black Clearcoat two-tone, Dark Shadow Gray/Black Clearcoat two-tone, or a solid Black Clearcoat. Unique pinstriping was found on all three of the color options.

Changes to the Harley package in 2005 corresponded to the refresh of the F-250 and F-350 Super Duty models. The Harley-Davidson edition was only available in a Crew Cab, and the 5.4L V8 was added as the base engine for the package. New unique black-trimmed headlights, a billet-style grille, and 20-inch wheels were made standard. Gone were the two-tone paint jobs, but optional were painted ghost flames; 2005 models were available in a Black or True Blue Metallic paint job. The interior stayed largely the same, with luxurious black leather captain's chairs in the front and rear and Harley Bar and Shield badging galore, but the truck received the same interior updates as other 2005 Super Duty trucks.

=== F-450/F-550 ===
To bridge the gap between the pickup line and the much larger medium-duty F-650/F-750, Ford introduced the F-450 and F-550 variants of the Super Duty; with an available GVWR from 14,000 to 19,500 lb, it pushes the Super Duty into the Class 5 truck market. Available only as a chassis cab, both versions were fitted with dual rear wheels.

While largely aimed at fleet buyers, F-450 and F-550 models were configurable in XL, XLT, and Lariat trim levels available to Super Duty pickup buyers. The sole gasoline engine was the 6.8L V10, while the 7.3L Power Stroke was the diesel option; in mid-2003, this was replaced by the 6.0L Power Stroke.

For 2005, the F-450 and F-550 received further updates to the exterior than the rest of the Super Duty line, with an extended front bumper and front fenders; the F-550 received a "wide-track" front axle to sharpen its turning radius.

=== Worldwide ===
The Ford F-350 Super Duty first generation was also assembled in Venezuela as a commercial small truck from 1999 to 2010. For this market, the F-350 was equipped with the 5.4L V8 Triton engine, a five-speed manual transmission, and a choice of two- or four-wheel drive.

Ford Super Duty trucks were built in Brazil, with different engines from their North American counterparts and fewer options, initially between 1999 and 2011, with a limited reintroduction of the F-350 in 2014. The dual-rear wheel variant of the F-350 is known locally as F-4000. They were widely exported to Australia (F-250 and F-350), South Africa (F-250), and Argentina (F-250, rebadged as F-100, and the F-350 DRW rebadged as F-4000), usually following the Brazilian specification (with an obvious change of the cockpit location in the versions targeted to Australia, South Africa, and other RHD markets), but Australia had a wider range of options in pair with its American counterparts, including automatic transmission and the V8 engines. The SuperCab was never officially available in Brazil and regional export markets (Uruguay and Argentina), but was made in RHD for export to Australia. South Africa had only the MWM engine and five-speed manual transmission, with the option of 2WD and 4WD for the single cab, while the crew cab had 4WD as standard.

== Second generation (2008–2010) ==
Second generation (P356)
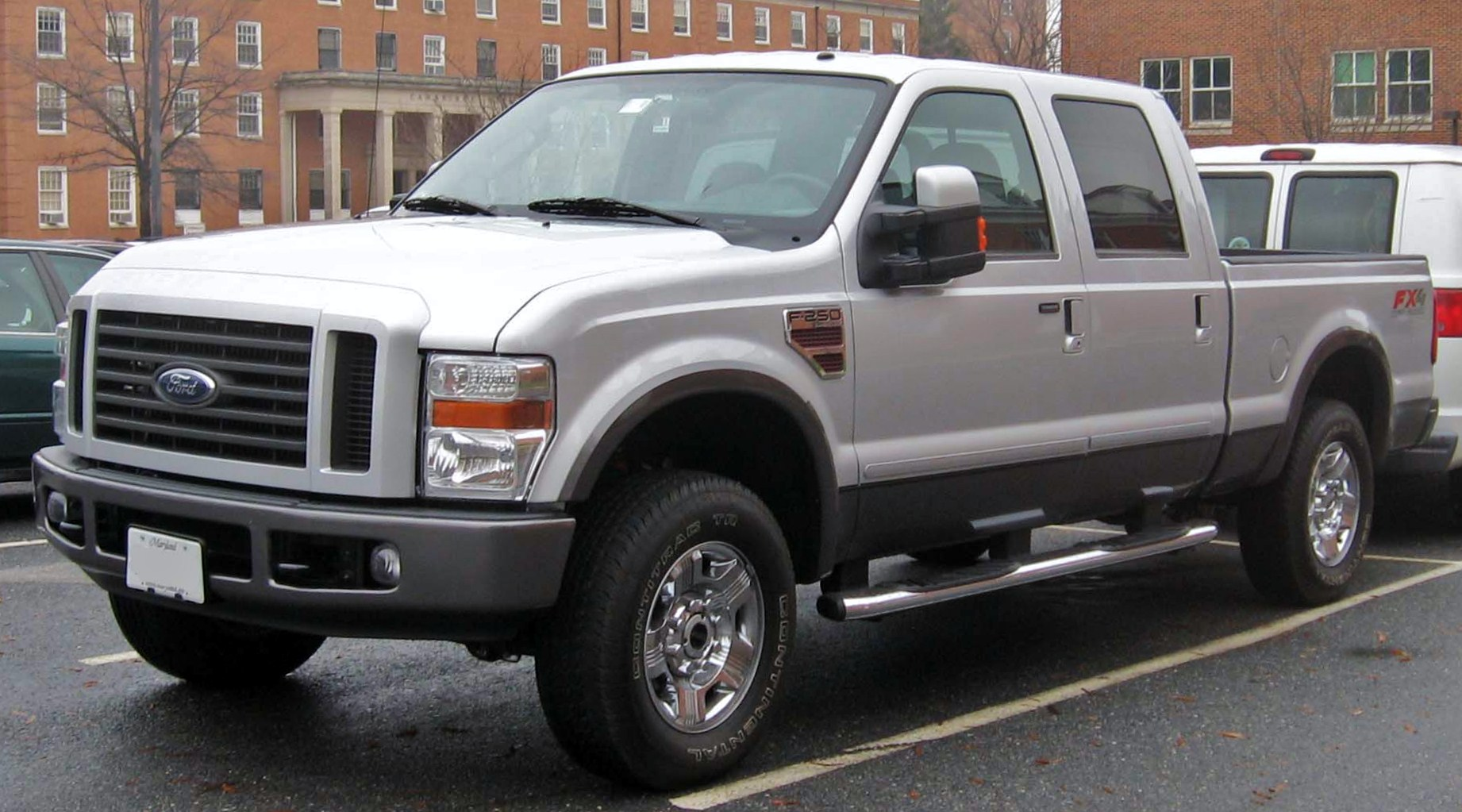
- 2008 Ford F-250 FX4

Overview
- Also called: F-250; F-350; F-450; F-550
- Production: December 18, 2006 – February 2010
- Model years: 2008–2010
- Assembly: Louisville, Kentucky, United States (Kentucky Truck Assembly)
- Designer: Pat Schiavone (2004)

Body and chassis
- Body style: 2-door regular cab 4-door extended cab (SuperCab); 4-door crew cab

Powertrain
- Engine: Gasoline: 5.4 L Triton V8 (F-250/F-350 only); 6.8 L Triton V10; Diesel: 6.4 L Power Stroke V8
- Transmission: 5-speed manual (Mexico and Venezuela only on F-350); 6-speed ZF S6-650 manual; 5-speed 5R110W automatic

Dimensions
- Wheelbase: 137 in (3,480 mm); 141.8 in (3,602 mm); 158 in (4,013 mm); 156.2 in (3,967 mm); 172.4 in (4,379 mm)
- Length: 227 in (5,766 mm) (Regular Cab, Long Bed); 231.8 in (5,888 mm) (SuperCab, Short Bed); 248 in (6,299 mm) (SuperCab, Long Bed); 246.2 in (6,253 mm) (Crew Cab, Short Bed); 262.4 in (6,665 mm) (Crew Cab, Long Bed); 271.5 in (6,896 mm) (F-450, F-550 SuperCab); 274.5 in (6,972 mm) (F-450, F-550 Regular Cab); 285.9 in (7,262 mm) (F-450, F-550 Crew Cab); 286.5 in (7,277 mm) (F-450, F-550 Regular Cab)
- Width: SRW: 79.9 in (2,029 mm); DRW: 95.5 in (2,426 mm)
- Height: 76–81 in (1,930–2,057 mm)

The second-generation Super Duty was originally going to debut for the 2007 model year, but quality issues pushed it back to the 2008 model year. It receives an all-new 6.4 L (390 cu in) Power Stroke diesel V8 with piezoelectric fuel injectors and sequential turbochargers to replace the 6.0L Power Stroke single-turbo diesel V8. The new engine produces 350 hp (261 kW) and 650 ft⋅lbf (881 N⋅m) of torque. The vehicle had its first official showing at the Texas State Fair in 2006. Ford started taking orders in January 2007. The first 2008 F-450 pickup sold to the public was delivered to Randy Whipple of Muskegon, Michigan, in February 2007.

Located near the same dash area as the last generation (but slightly to the right and more directly below the radio), this generation of Super Duty models had the same Ford TowCommand trailer brake controller and four auxiliary upfitter switches as the last generation set-up.

An optional concealed slide-out step and swing-up hand grab bar were added to the rear tailgate for easy access.

Ford introduced its all-new optional "Rapid-Heat Supplemental Cab Heater", only available with the diesel engine and TorqShift automatic transmission. In the winter, it quickly raised the cab's temperature to a comfortable level until the engine was warm enough to handle the job.

The interior of the Super Duty was completely redesigned, with a new instrument cluster (with an enhanced message center) with similar styling to that of the 11th generation F-150 (2004–2008), as well as a new steering wheel, center dash bezel, interior door panels, and seat trim. Sirius Satellite Radio, a 3.5 mm auxiliary audio input jack (for all models equipped with a CD player or CD changer), a new "premium" audio system with an external amplifier and subwoofer, and a GPS navigation system radio with a touchscreen display were all new features. In 2009, the Ford SYNC entertainment system became available on select trim levels, adding Bluetooth hands-free calling and wireless stereo audio streaming via A2DP and a USB port for the first time on the Super Duty.

2010 is also the final model year for the 6.8-liter V10 in the F-250 and F-350, as well as dual-rear-wheel configurations in short bed.

=== Trim ===
This generation of Super Duty trucks included the F-250, F-350, and the all-new F-450. The F-250 and F-350 basically had the same payload and towing specifications as the last generation. The trim level lineup for the 2010 F-250, F-350, and F-450 consisted of the XL, XLT, Lariat, Cabela's (except F-450), King Ranch, and Harley-Davidson.

The FX4 model, which was once just an optional off-road 4×4 package that could be added to any model in the lineup, was replaced by the 4×4 Off Road Package. The FX4 became a model of its own. It still had the same specs as the previous generation but with more of a sporty trim package. The FX4 model was discontinued for the 2010 model year and was reverted to an optional off-road 4×4 package.

- XL – Included: Vinyl upholstery, 5.4L Triton V8, 17" steel wheels with all-season tires, rear folding bench seat (XL Crew Cab), an AM/FM stereo with digital clock and 2 speakers, black vinyl floor covering, visors, sealed-beam halogen lamps, manual windows, manual locks, and manual side-view mirrors.
- XLT – Added: 18" steel wheels, cloth upholstery, lumbar support, power locks, power mirrors, power windows with automatic driver's side window, air conditioning, an AM/FM stereo with a single-CD player with MP3 capability, an auxiliary input jack, a digital clock and four speakers, cruise control, color coordinated carpet floor covering, tilt steering wheel, and dual-beam headlamps.
- FX4 (2008–2009) – Added: 17" forged aluminum wheels with all-terrain tires, automatic headlamps, illuminated entry, keyless entry with driver door keypad, securi-lock anti-theft ignition, a security alarm, FX4 cloth upholstery, black all-weather floor mats, metallic faced cluster with chrome faced gauges, overhead console with sunglasses storage, and a black-leather wrapped steering wheel.
- Lariat – Added: Power driver and passenger seats, leather upholstery, automatic air conditioning, enhanced message center with distance to empty and compass, color-coordinated leather wrapped steering wheel with audio controls, visors with illuminated mirrors, and woodgrain style accents for the dash, and later, Ford SYNC.

=== Special Editions ===
For 2008, Ford and Harley-Davidson partnered again to bring out the special edition Super Duty Harley-Davidson package. It was available on both F-250 and F-350 Crew Cab single-rear-wheel models. A gasoline engine was no longer offered with the package; instead, a 6.4 L Power Stroke turbo diesel was standard. Unique black and dusted copper two-tone leather captain's chairs with bar and shield logo, leather-trimmed center console, unique gauge cluster, and embroidered carpeted floor mats rounded out interior features. Twenty-inch wheels, billet-style grille, blacked out headlights, illuminated cab steps, power folding body-color Powerscope mirrors, rubber bed mat with Harley-Davidson logo, and special badging were the exterior highlights. The truck could be ordered with two unique exterior themes—a black monochromatic look with bodyside graphics or a black-and-vintage-copper two-tone with chrome dimensional box side Harley-Davidson lettering. An Audiophile premium eight-speaker stereo with subwoofer was standard, while a DVD-based navigation system was optional. A rear-seat DVD entertainment system with 8" screen was also optional but could not be ordered with the power moonroof.

The Harley-Davidson package was updated for 2009. For the first time, this package was offered on the F-450 DRW pickup. The interior was trimmed in all black leather, instead of the previous year's two-tone trim. New colors were offered: Black with flame tape stripes, Black with Vista Blue painted flames, and Dark Blue Pearl with Vista Blue painted flames. Ford's ToughBed spray-on bedliner and a rearview camera were made options. For 2010, only minor changes were made. Dark Blue Pearl was deleted from the color options in favor of Black with Tuxedo Black painted flames and the rearview camera was made standard. 2010 was the final year Ford offered a factory Harley-Davidson Super Duty (not counting the 2020+ based limited edition).

For 2008, a 60th anniversary package was available to celebrate 60 years of the F-Series brand. Featuring two-tone paint, additional chrome trim, and special badging, 2,500 were to be built, and it was only available with the XLT trim.

For 2009 and 2010, a special Cabela's edition was available in the FX4 Crew Cab configuration. This version included a basic package and a luxury package. The basic package included cloth captain's chairs, wood trim on center stack, all-weather floor mats, front and rear locking firearm storage, and an AM/FM radio. The luxury package included everything in the basic package but with leather seats and a navigation-based radio. In addition, both versions featured special badging and two-tone paint options.

=== Powertrain ===
The same two gasoline engines and their power ratings were carried over from the previous generation. The 5.4 L (330 cu in) V8 is standard, while the 6.8 L (410 cu in) V10 was still a $699 option over the 5.4L V8; both were SOHC engines and used three-valve-per-cylinder heads. The 6.4 L (390 cu in) OHV four-valve-per-cylinder Power Stroke diesel engine, supplied by Navistar, was a $6,895 option over the 5.4 L (330 cu in) V8.

Gasoline engines
Model	Years	Type	Power, torque
Triton SOHC V8 (F-250/F-350 only)	2008–2010	5.4 L (330 cu in) 24-valve V8	300 hp (224 kW; 304 PS), 365 lb⋅ft (495 N⋅m)
Triton SOHC V10	2008–2010	6.8 L (412 cu in) 30-valve V10	362 hp (270 kW; 367 PS), 457 lb⋅ft (620 N⋅m)

Diesel engines
Model	Years	Type	Power, torque at rpm
6.4L Power Stroke (International MaxxForce 7)	2008–2010	6.3 L (387 cu in) 32-valve sequential-turbocharged Diesel V8	Pickup and F-350 Chassis Cab: 350 hp (261 kW; 355 PS) at 3,000, 650 lb⋅ft (881 N⋅m) at 2,000; F-450/F-550 Chassis Cab: 325 hp (242 kW; 330 PS) at 3,000, 600 lb⋅ft (813 N⋅m) at 2,000

=== F-450 pickup ===
There are some unique points to highlight of the F-450 with a regular-production pickup bed, which was previously only offered as a chassis cab. It had two available axle ratios of 4.30:1 and 4.88:1. The F-450 with the optional "High Capacity Trailer Tow Package" increased the GCWR from 26,000 lb (12,000 kg) to 33,000 lb (15,000 kg). Maximum payload was 6,120 lb (2,780 kg). The maximum towing capacity was 24,500 lb (11,100 kg) (4.88:1 axle ratio) or 20,500 lb (9,300 kg) (4.30:1 axle ratio). The only configuration was the Crew Cab (until 2019 when a Regular Cab debuted for the F-450), with an 8-foot (2.4 m) long bed, DRW (Dual Rear Wheels), limited-slip rear axle, 10-lug 19.5-inch (500 mm) forged Alcoa wheels, Trailer Tow package, and the TowCommand TBC (Trailer Brake Controller). The only engine offered in the F-450 was the 6.4L V8 Power Stroke sequential turbo diesel. The F-450 was equipped with a standard 6-speed manual or the optional 5-speed TorqShift automatic transmission.

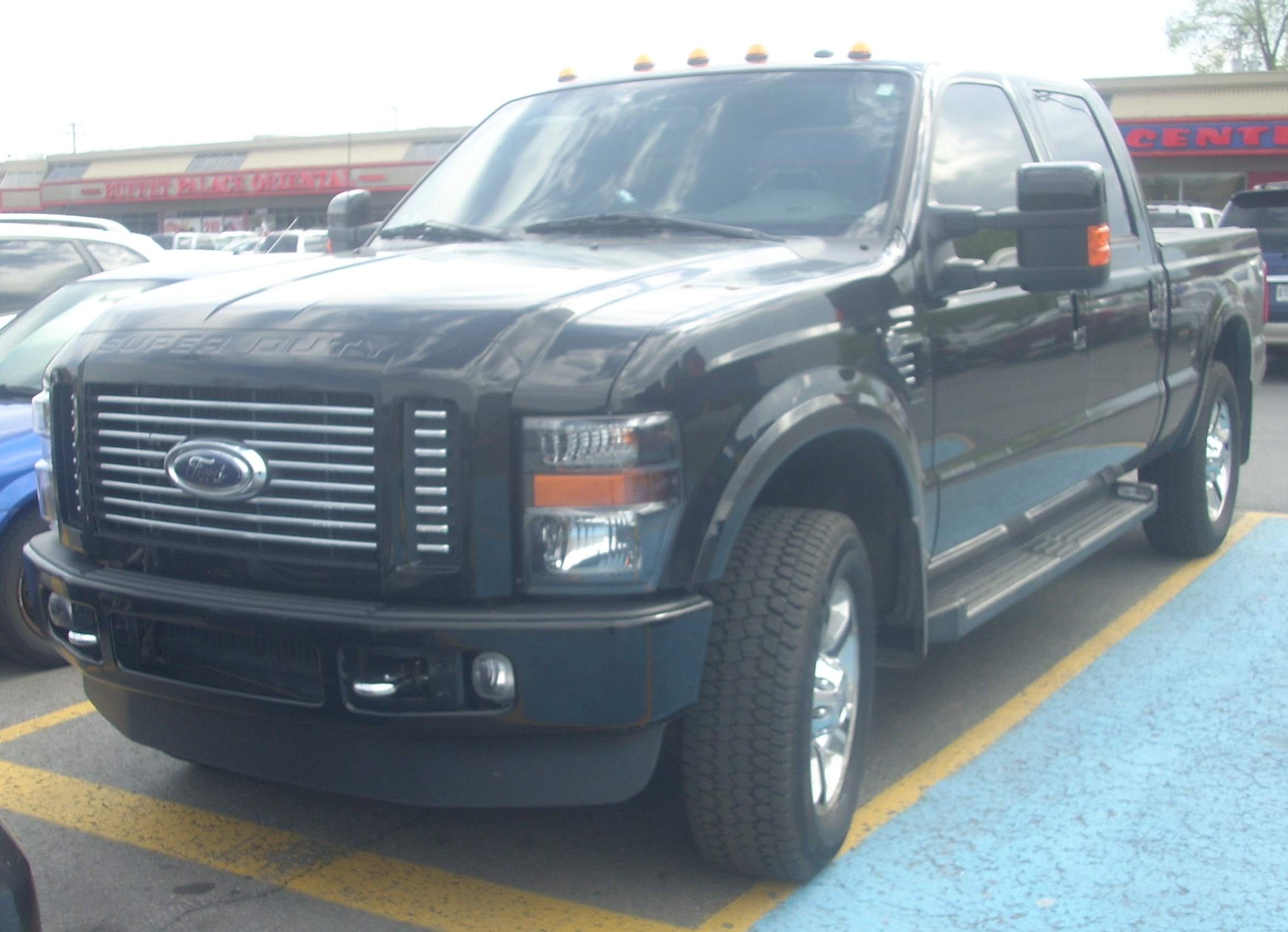
Ford F-250 Super Duty Harley-Davidson crew cab

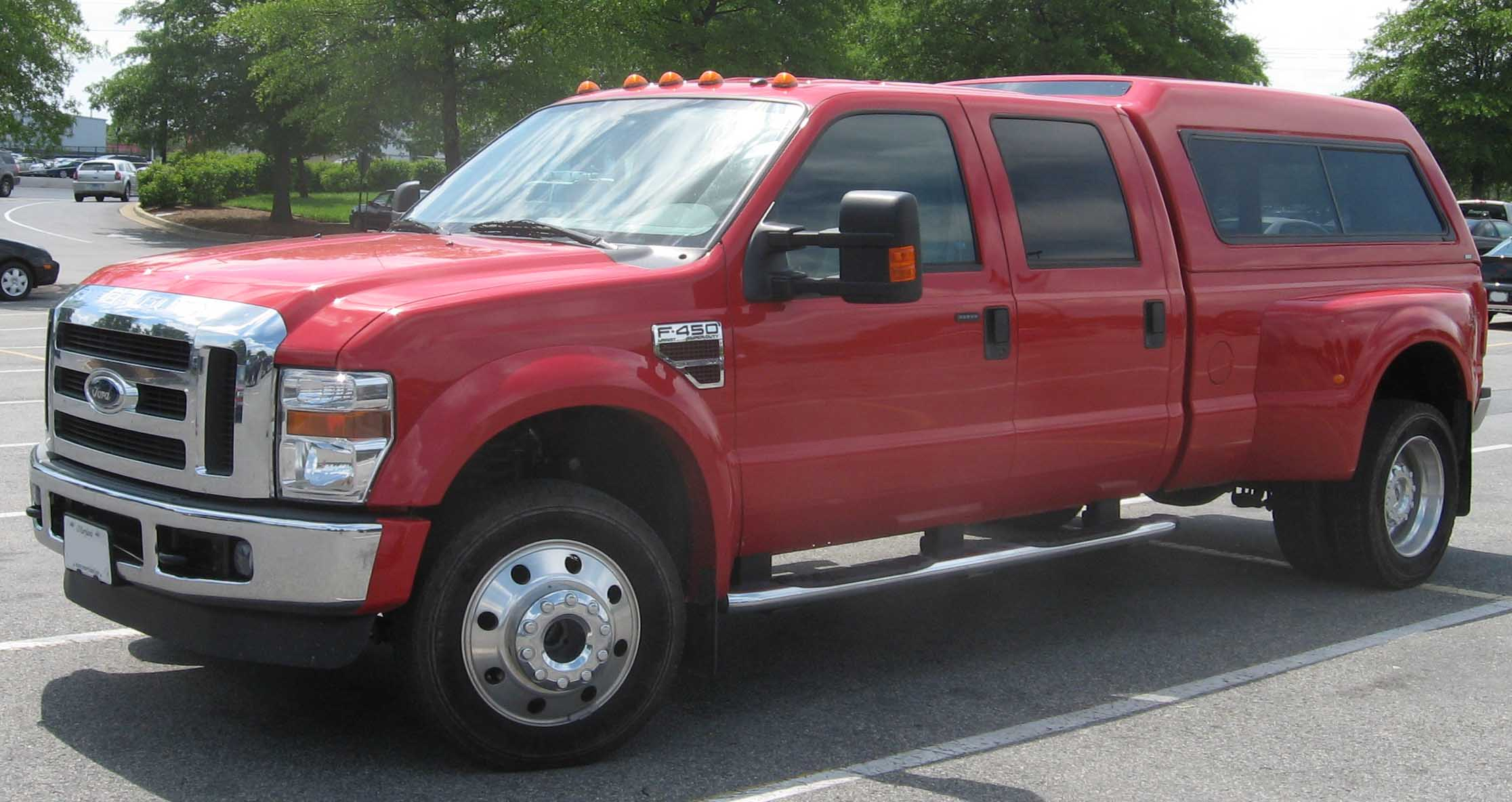
2008 Ford F-450 equipped with a bed cap

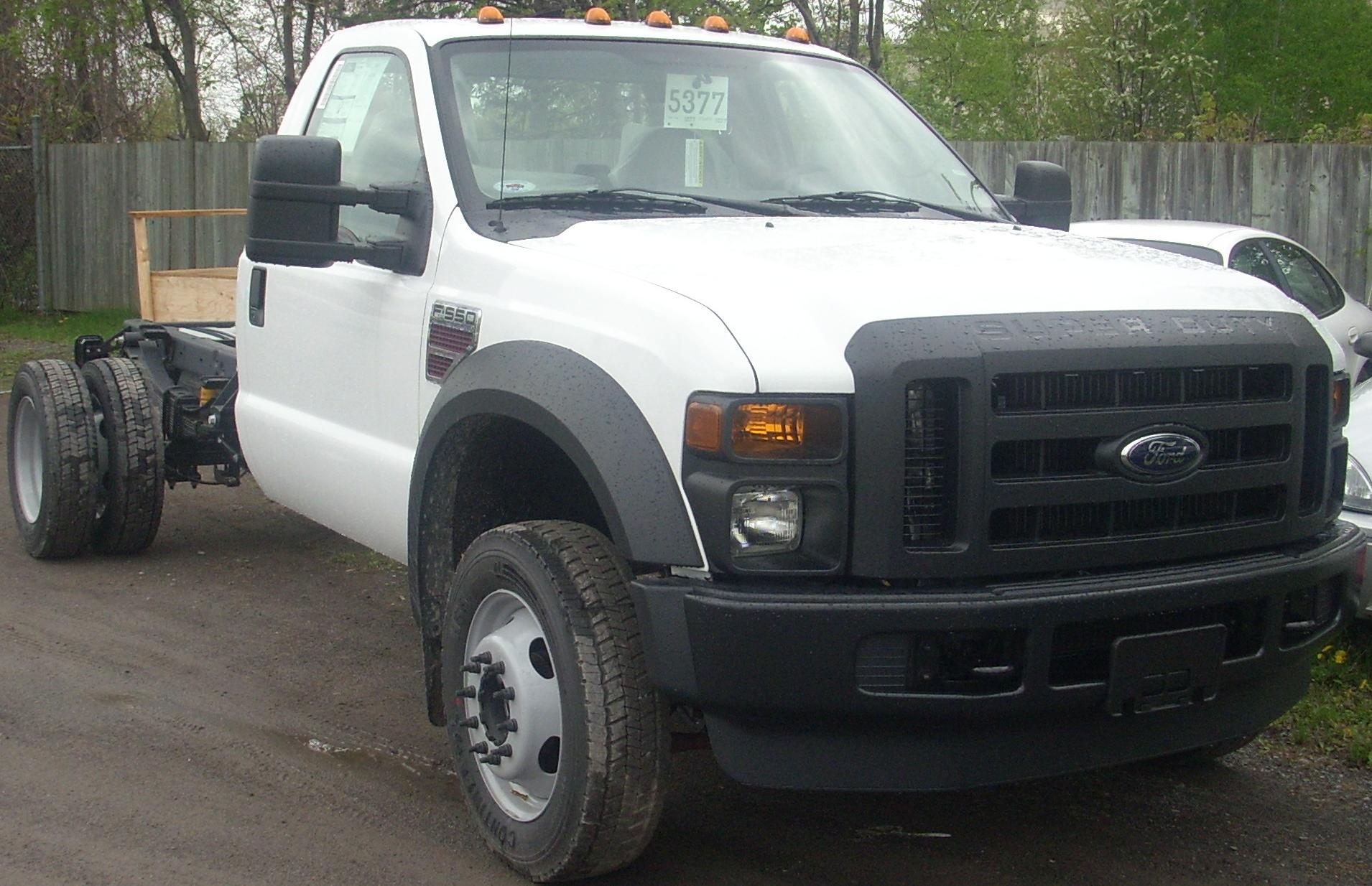
Ford F-550 Super Duty

== Third generation (2011–2016) ==
Third generation (P473)
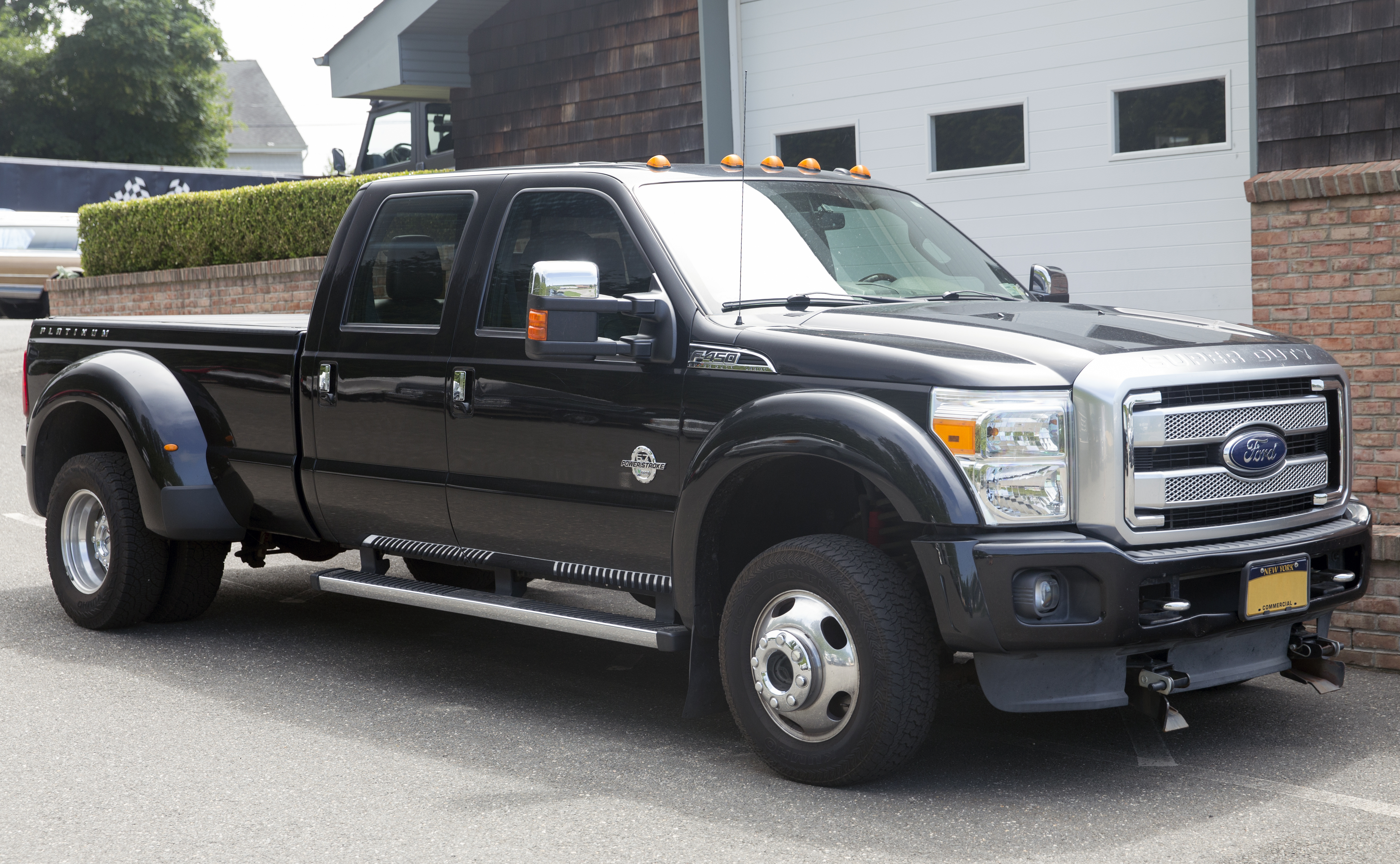
- 2014 Ford F-450 Super Duty Crew Cab Platinum

Overview
- Also called: F-250; F-350; F-450; F-550
- Production: February 2010 – June 2016
- Model years: 2011–2016
- Assembly: Louisville, Kentucky, United States (Kentucky Truck Assembly)
- Designer: Ed Golden (2007)

Body and chassis
- Body style: 2-door regular cab 4-door extended cab (SuperCab); 4-door crew cab

Powertrain
- Engine: Gasoline: 6.2 L Boss SOHC V8; 6.8 L Triton V10 (F-450/F-550 chassis cabs only); Diesel: 6.7 L Power Stroke Turbodiesel V8
- Transmission: 5-speed 5R110W automatic (F-450/F-550 chassis cabs w/V10 only): 5-speed manual (F-350 in Mexico and Venezuela only); 6-speed 6R140 automatic with and without PTO

Dimensions
- Wheelbase: 137 in (3,480 mm); 141.8 in (3,602 mm); 158 in (4,013 mm); 156.2 in (3,967 mm); 172.4 in (4,379 mm)
- Length: 227.6 in (5,781 mm) (Regular Cab, Long Bed); 232.4 in (5,903 mm) (Ext Cab, Short Bed); 248.6 in (6,314 mm) (Ext Cab, Long Bed); 246.8 in (6,269 mm) (Crew Cab, Short Bed); 263.0 in (6,680 mm) (Crew Cab, Long Bed); 271.5 in (6,896 mm) (F-450, F-550 SuperCab); 274.5 in (6,972 mm) (F-450, F-550 Regular Cab); 285.9 in (7,262 mm) (F-450, F-550 Crew Cab); 286.5 in (7,277 mm) (F-450, F-550 Regular Cab)
- Width: SRW: 79.9 in (2,029 mm); DRW: 95.5 in (2,426 mm)
- Height: 76–81 in (1,930–2,057 mm)

The Super Duty line received a significant exterior upgrade that includes a new, bigger front fascia. Its engines were also upgraded to better compete with the new Silverado HD and Ram HD. Ford stated in the 2011 Chicago Auto Show that the 2011 trucks had the thickest gauge steel frame of any truck in its class; this was due to the frame being the same design that debuted in 1999. The 2011 Ford F-Series Super Duty was awarded Truckin's "Topline Pulling Power" award for 2011. It also won Popular Mechanics' best workhorse of 2011, and the best "Gear of the Year" in the trucks category.

The F-450 is able to tow 24,400 pounds (11,100 kg) and has a maximum payload of 4,920 pounds (2,230 kg). The F-350 has a maximum 21,600 pounds (9,800 kg) of towing capacity and 3,770–4,600 pounds (1,710–2,090 kg) of payload depending on configuration. Each engine is mated to a 6R140 heavy-duty TorqShift six-speed automatic transmission. The Ford F-250, F-350, and F-450 all come with trim levels including the XL, XLT, Lariat, King Ranch, and Platinum.

The third generation of the Ford Super Duty trucks were assembled at Ford's Kentucky Truck Plant, with additional production in Venezuela. In Venezuela, the F-350 was offered as a commercial use small truck cutaway featuring a 6.2L V8 gas engine with a 5-speed manual TREMEC transmission TR-4050 with a choice of two- or four-wheel drive. Since 2012 due to government regulations, the Venezuelan F-350 Super Duty is factory equipped to use both natural gas and gasoline. The F-250 Super Duty was also recently re-introduced in this market after ten years. It was being marketed using the same engine as the Venezuelan F-350, but only with a 6-speed automatic transmission, 4×2 or 4×4 wheel drive option in both single and double cab configurations.

A feature unique to the 2011 Super Duty was the addition of a locking differential. It was only available for the F-250 and SRW F-350 4×4 models with a rear Sterling 10.5 axle. It was a US$390 option. The diesel F-250 used vacuum-boost brakes, while the F-350 used Hydro-Boost brakes. Both gas versions of the F-250 and SRW F-350 used vacuum-boost. The F-250 was a Class 2 truck, while the F-350 SRW, F-350 DRW, and F-450 pickup were Class 3 trucks. The F-250 and F-350 (SRW and DRW) have 13.66-inch front brakes and 13.39-inch rear brakes. The 2015–2016 F-250 and F-350 had 14.29-inch vented disc brakes on the front and rear axles as an improvement made for these model years. The F-450 pickup had 14.53-inch front brakes and 15.35-inch rear brakes. The F-450 had a wider track than the F-350. The F-450 remained available in Class 4 as a chassis-cab truck.

The trucks were once under investigation by the National Highway Traffic Safety Administration for steering failures, but the investigation revealed that the failures were caused by driver error and had nothing to do with design.

For the 2011 model year, the central bezel from the second-generation (2008–2010) Super Duty was kept, although features such as a full color LCD instrument panel display screen and a Sony premium amplified audio system with subwoofer were now available. An auxiliary audio input jack now came standard on all Super Duty models, regardless of radio choice.

In 2013, upper trim-level Super Duties could be ordered with the new MyFord Touch infotainment system with Ford SYNC, which included an eight-inch touchscreen display, a rear backup camera system, and HD Radio. The center bezel in these trucks was slightly redesigned to accommodate the new infotainment system, which was also paired with the Sony premium amplified audio system with subwoofer.

=== Trim ===
- XL – Included: Vinyl upholstery, manual seats with cupholders and storage bin in front, manual locks, manual windows, 17" steel wheels (F-250/350) or 17" aluminum wheels (F-450), trailer brake controller (DRW), manual air conditioning, black vinyl floor covering, malfunction message center, manual towing mirrors, and an AM/FM stereo with digital clock and two speakers.
- XLT – Added: 17" aluminum wheels, trailer brake controller, accessory delay, power locks, power windows with automatic driver's side window, cruise control, MyKey owner controls, security alarm, tinted rear windows, keyless entry, heated mirrors with turn signals, and an AM/FM stereo with single-CD player with MP3 capability, an auxiliary input jack and four speakers.
- Lariat – Added: leather upholstery, flow through center console with lockable storage, a 120 V power outlet, reverse parking aid, leather trimmed power front seats, air conditioning with auto temp control, auto-dimming rear view mirror, enhanced message center, a premium AM/FM stereo with single-CD player, MP3 capability, auxiliary input jack, SIRIUS Satellite Radio, steering wheel audio controls and eight speakers with subwoofer, auto lamp with rain lamp feature, fog lamps, power sliding rear window, power heated mirrors with spotlights and turn signals, SecuriLock entry keypad, body colored handles, and Ford SYNC.
- King Ranch – Added: chaparral-leather trimmed seats, heated and cooled front seats, chaparral leather-wrapped steering wheel with audio controls, memory driver's seat, pedals and mirrors, rear view camera, remote start, King Ranch logo on seats and floor, and body color mirrors.

=== Powertrain ===
==== Engines ====
The 2011 Ford Super Duty was available with either a gasoline or diesel engine. The gasoline option was an E85-capable 6.2L 2-valve SOHC Ford Boss V8, which put out 385 horsepower (287 kW; 390 PS) and 405 pound-feet (549 N⋅m) of torque under 10,000 lb (4,500 kg) GVWR (316 horsepower (236 kW; 320 PS) and 397 lb⋅ft (538 N⋅m) of torque over 10,000 lb GVWR). The diesel option was the new 6.7L Power Stroke V8, producing 390 hp (291 kW; 395 PS) and 735 lb⋅ft (997 N⋅m) of torque. The new engine was an entirely Ford product, unlike previous diesels, therefore reducing development costs and shipping delays.

The 6.8L V10 was dropped from the F-250 and F-350 pickup and chassis-cab models, but was carried over in the F-450 and F-550 chassis cabs; it was mated with a 5-speed automatic transmission.

Shortly after the introduction of the 6.7L Power Stroke V8, General Motors unveiled the 2011 Chevrolet Silverado and GMC Sierra HD with the Duramax 6.6-liter turbodiesel V8, making 397 hp (296 kW; 403 PS) and 765 lb⋅ft (1,037 N⋅m) of torque. Ford quickly responded by boosting the output of the Power Stroke just months after its initial release, to 400 hp (298 kW; 406 PS) and 800 lb⋅ft (1,100 N⋅m) of torque. For customers who purchased a Super Duty with the original Power Stroke V8, Ford offered a free upgrade at dealerships to the new level of output. Power and torque were increased to 440 hp (328 kW; 446 PS) and 860 lb⋅ft (1,170 N⋅m) of torque for 2015.

Gasoline engines
Model	Years	Type	Power, torque
Boss	2011–2016	6.2 L (379 cu in) 16-valve SOHC V8	10,001 lb (4,536 kg) GVWR and more: 317 hp (236 kW; 321 PS) at 4,179, 397 lb⋅ft (538 N⋅m) at 4,179; Under 10,000 lb (4,536 kg) GVWR: 385 hp (287 kW; 390 PS) at 5,500, 405 lb⋅ft (549 N⋅m) at 4,500
Triton (F-450/F-550 Chassis Cab only)	2011–2016	6.8 L (412 cu in) 30-valve SOHC V10	362 hp (270 kW; 367 PS) at 4,750 rpm, 457 lb⋅ft (620 N⋅m) at 3,250 rpm

Diesel engines
Model	Years	Type	Power, torque at rpm
Power Stroke (Ford Scorpion V8)	2011–2016	6.7 L (409 cu in) 32-valve, turbocharged diesel V8	Before August 2010: 390 hp (291 kW; 395 PS) at 2,800, 735 lb⋅ft (997 N⋅m) at 1,600; 2011–2014: 400 hp (298 kW; 406 PS) at 2,800, 800 lb⋅ft (1,085 N⋅m) at 1,600; 2015–2016: 440 hp (328 kW; 446 PS) at 2,800, 860 lb⋅ft (1,166 N⋅m) at 1,600; Chassis Cab 2011–2016: 300 hp (224 kW; 304 PS) at 2,800, 660 lb⋅ft (895 N⋅m) at 1,600

==== Transmission ====
No manual transmission was available in the United States, but in Mexico and Venezuela, the F-350 was available with a 5-speed manual. The automatic transmissions had a manual mode. The diesel engine's transmission optionally featured a PTO and is a "live-drive" unit ("live-drive" meaning the PTO is directly connected to the engine's crankshaft), whereas the GM's Allison 1000 transmission and Ram's Aisin used a torque converter or clutch (depending on being an automatic or manual, respectively).

6R140
Gear	1	2	3	4	5	6	R
Ratio	3.974	2.318	1.516	1.149	0.858	0.674	-3.280

==== Cooling system ====
On the 6.7L diesel engine only, there were two separate cooling systems:

1. High-temperature system that runs at 194 °F (90 °C) to cool the engine.
2. Low-temperature system with a 122 °F (50 °C) coolant for the following:

- fuel cooler
- EGR system
- transmission fluid
- air-to-water inter-cooler

A belt-driven pump mounted low on the driver side circulated the high-temperature coolant, while a separate belt-driven pump mounted higher on the passenger side circulated the low-temperature coolant.

=== F-450 pickup ===
The F-450 pickup returned for 2011. Just like the 2008–2010 model, the F-450 pickup was only available in one single configuration; a crew cab with a dual-rear-wheel 8-foot (2.4 m) bed. The only powertrain combination again was the 6.7L Power Stroke turbodiesel V8 mated to the six-speed TorqShift automatic transmission. Trims include the XL, XLT, Lariat, King Ranch, and Platinum (the latter two were actually add-ons to the Lariat trim). Specifications:

- Wheelbase: 172.4 in (4,379.0 mm) (crew cab, long bed)
- Payload: 4,920 lb (2,230 kg) (2011), 5,260 lb (2,390 kg) (2012), 5,880 lb (2,670 kg) (2013), 5,450 lb (2,470 kg) (2015)
- Towing capacity: 24,400 lb (11,100 kg) (2011), 24,500 lb (11,100 kg) (2012), 24,700 lb (11,200 kg) (2013), 31,200 lb (14,200 kg) (2015)
- Front GAWR: 5,940 lb (2,690 kg)
- Rear GAWR: 9,100 lb (4,100 kg)
- GVWR: 13,050 lb (5,920 kg) (2011), 13,300 lb (6,000 kg) (2012), 14,000 lb (6,400 kg) (2013–2015)
- GCWR: 33,000 lb (15,000 kg), 40,000 lb (18,000 kg) (2015)
- Axle gear ratio: 4.30:1
- 4×4 only. No two-wheel drive (unlike the 2008–2010 model; until two-wheel drive returned for 2018).
- Alcoa forged wheels are the only available wheels.
  - LT245/75R17 (2011–2014)
  - MT225/70R19.5 (2015–2016)

=== Chassis cab ===
Chassis cab models were also updated using the new 2011 body style. Ford chassis cabs were still rated up to the industry maximum 19,500-pound Gross Vehicle Weight Rating. The Gross Combined Weight Rating was increased by 2,000 pounds (910 kg) to 35,000 pounds (16,000 kg) maximum, 5,000 pounds (2,300 kg) greater than the nearest competitor.

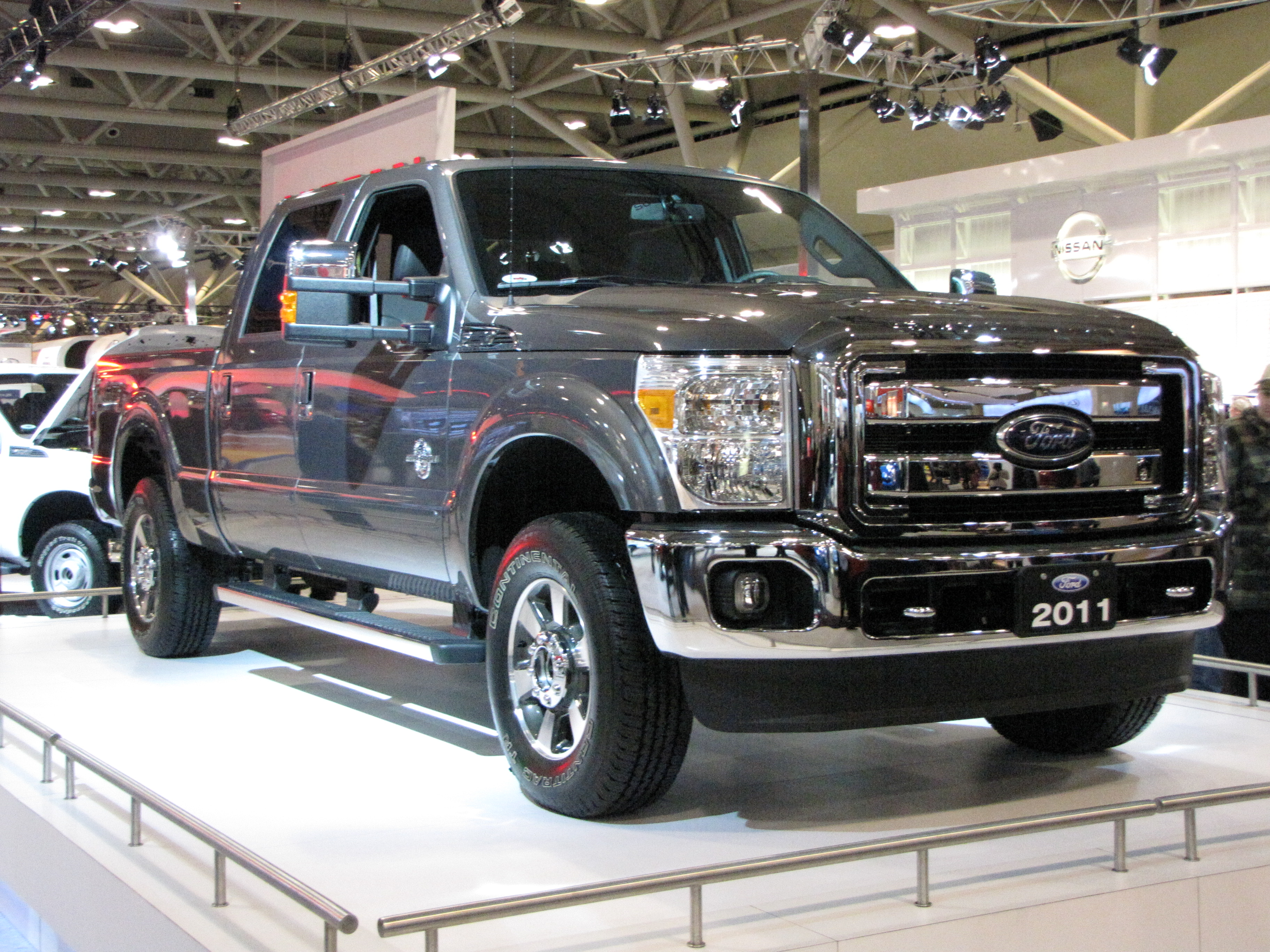
2011 Ford F-250/F-350 Crew Cab Lariat

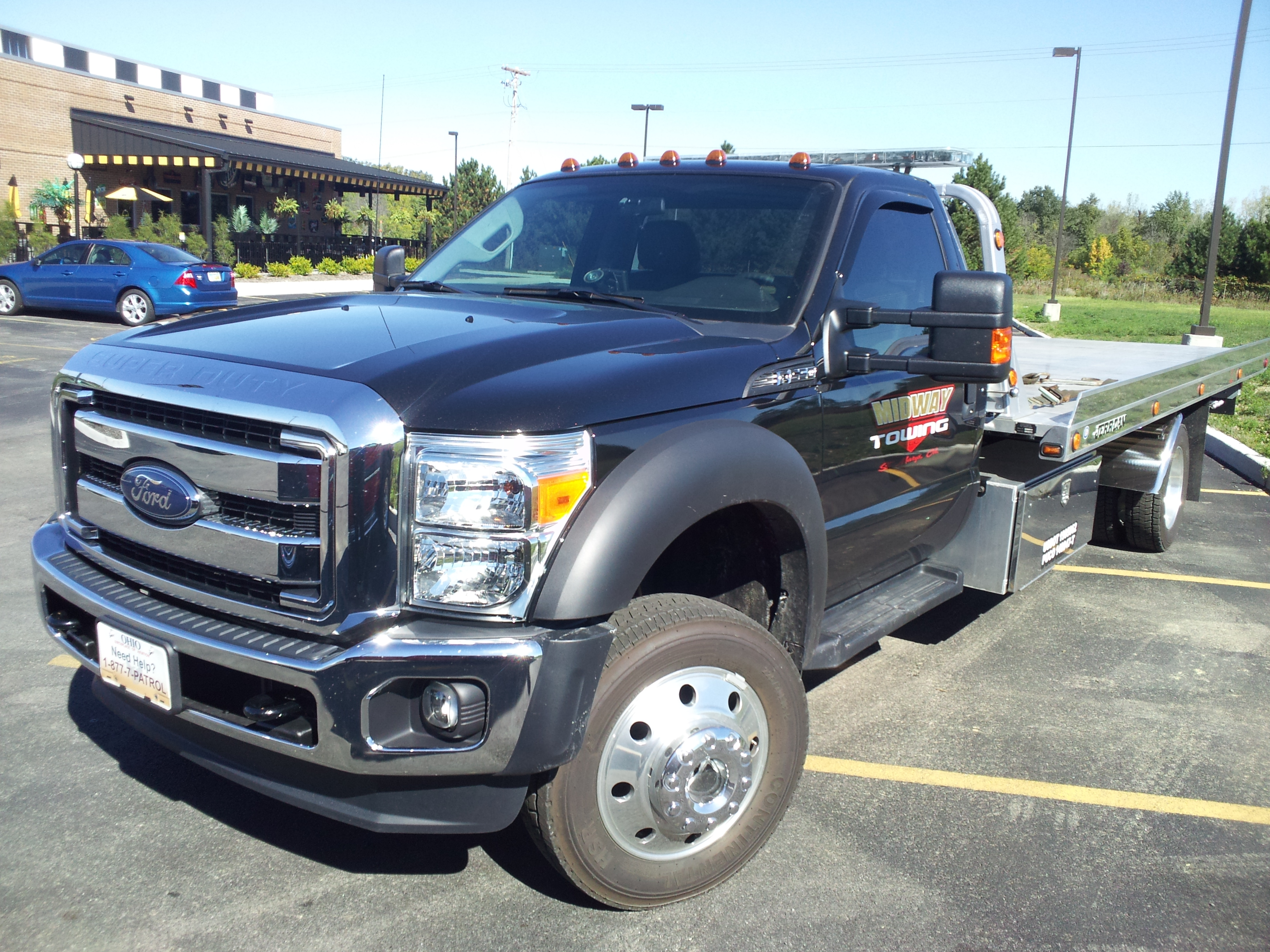
2013 F-550 4×4 Regular Cab rollback tow truck

== Fourth generation (2017–2022) ==
Fourth generation (P558)
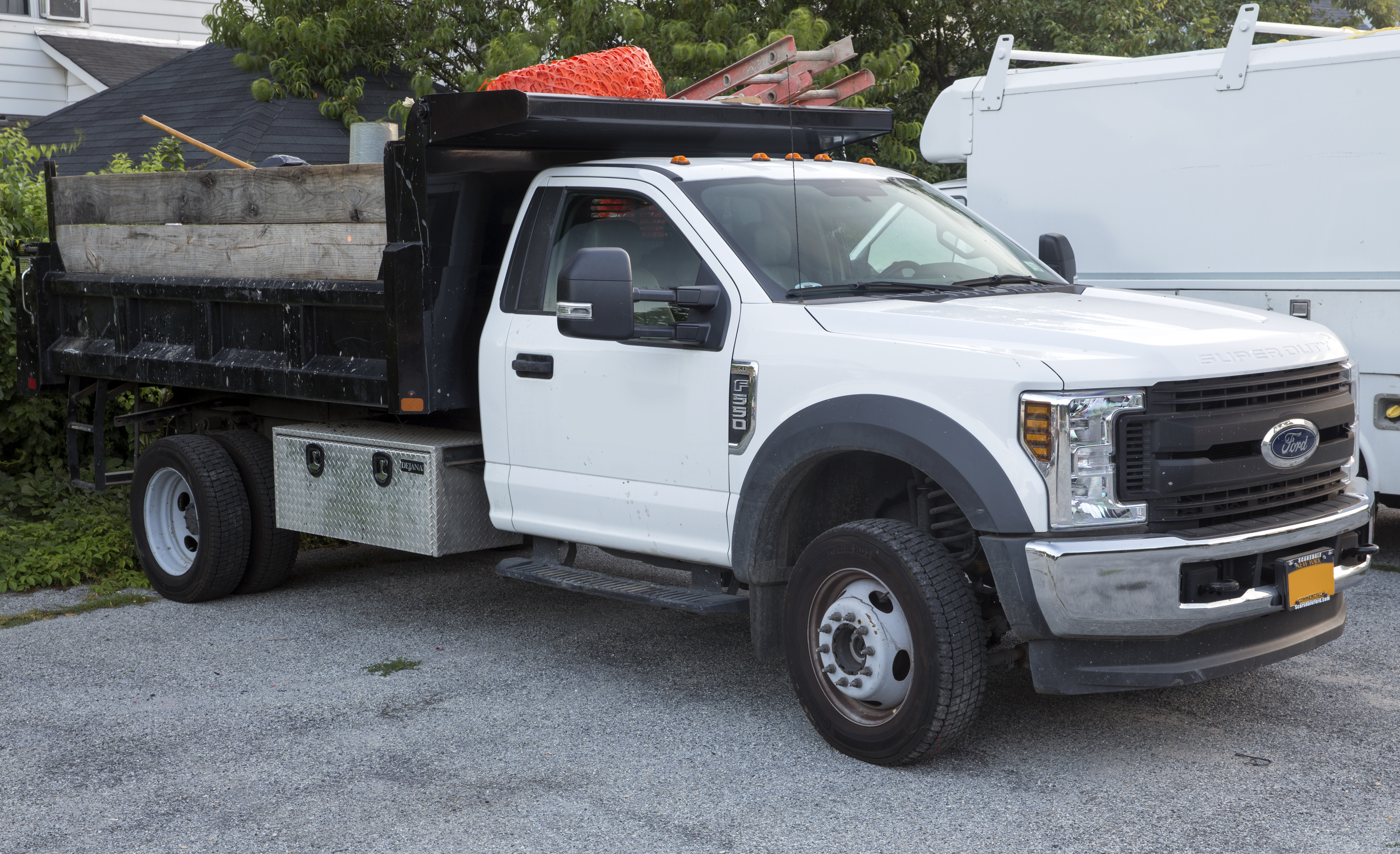
- 2019 Ford F-550 4×4 w/V10

Overview
- Type: Pickup truck (F-250, F-350, F-450); Chassis cab (F-350, F-450, F-550, F-600)
- Production: July 2016 – December 2022
- Model years: 2017–2022
- Assembly: Louisville, Kentucky (Kentucky Truck Assembly) (pickups and chassis-cabs); Avon Lake, Ohio (Ohio Assembly) (chassis-cabs only)

Body and chassis
- Body style: 2-door regular cab 4-door extended cab (SuperCab); 4-door crew cab
- Platform: Ford T platform (T3)
- Related: Ford F-150 (thirteenth generation)

Powertrain
- Engine: Gasoline: 6.2 L Boss SOHC V8; 6.8 L Triton V10 (F-450/F-550 chassis cab only); 7.3 L Godzilla OHV V8; Diesel: 6.7 L Power Stroke Turbodiesel V8
- Transmission: 5-speed manual (Mexico only for F-350 chassis cab only); 6-speed TorqShift automatic; 10-speed TorqShift automatic

Dimensions
- Wheelbase: 141.6 in (3,597 mm) (regular cab); 148.0 in (3,759 mm) (SuperCab, 6.75' bed); 164.2 in (4,171 mm) (SuperCab, 8' bed); 159.8 in (4,059 mm) (crew cab, 6.75' bed); 176.0 in (4,470 mm) (crew cab, 8' bed)
- Length: 231.8 in (5,888 mm) (regular cab); 238.2 in (6,050 mm) (SuperCab, 6.75' bed); 254.4 in (6,462 mm) (SuperCab, 8' bed); 250.0 in (6,350 mm) (crew cab, 6.75' bed); 266.2 in (6,761 mm) (crew cab, 8' bed)
- Width: SRW: 80.0 in (2,032 mm); DRW: 96.0 in (2,438 mm)
- Height: 77.8–82.1 in (1,976–2,085 mm)

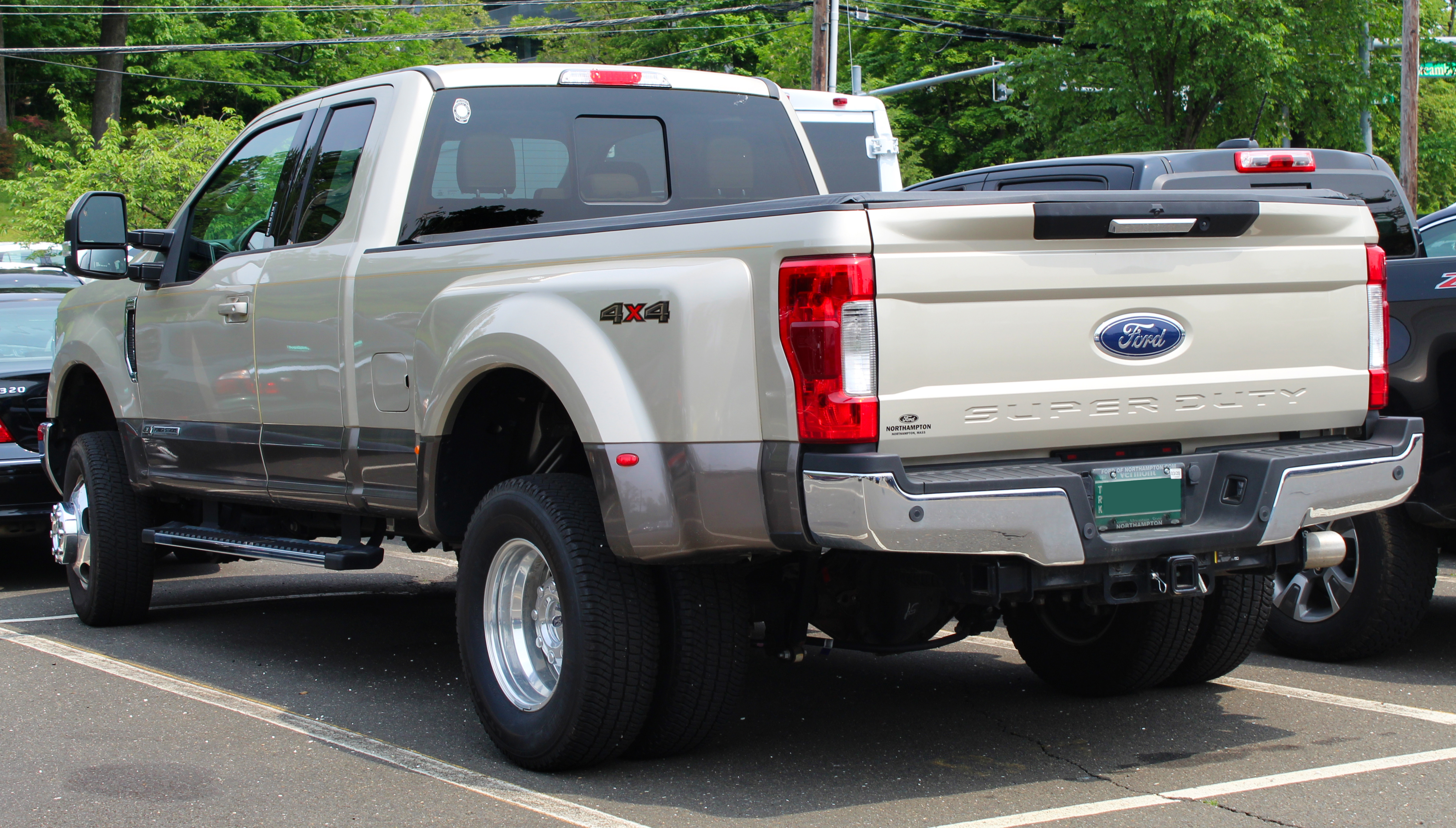
2017–2019 F-350 SuperCab DRW

On September 24, 2015, Ford unveiled the 2017 Super Duty line at the 2015 State Fair of Texas. This marked the first all-new Super Duty line since its 1998 debut; the frame is made from 95% high-strength steel and the body (like the contemporary F-150) was made from 6000 series aluminum alloy, advertised as a high-strength military grade aluminum alloy.

For the first time since 1996 with the ninth-generation F-Series, both the Super Duty and F-150 lines were constructed using the same cab to better compete with GM, Ram, and Nissan's HD trucks. In a major departure, the stand-alone front grille and stepped front fenders seen since 1999 were eliminated from the exterior. The two-bar grille introduced in 2011 was widened, integrating the headlights into its design. Despite now using the F-150 cabin, the SuperCrew name was still not used.

In a switch to an aluminum-intensive body similar to the F-150, Ford created a potential 700 pounds (320 kg) of weight savings; in spite of the addition of heavier-duty frame and driveline components, the 2017 Super Duty weighed in at up to 350 pounds (160 kg) less than comparable 2016 models. Ford strengthened the frame and drivetrain with fortified drive shafts, axles, brakes, towing hardware, and 4WD transfer case. F-250 and F-350 pickups were built on a fully boxed frame; chassis-cab models were produced on a frame boxed up to the rear of the cab and of open-C-channel design rearward.

For 2017 production, the Super Duty line shares its powertrain lineup with its 2016 predecessor: a 6.2L gasoline V8, 6.8L V10 (F-450 and above), with a 6.7L diesel V8 available in all versions. The 6.2L gasoline V8 engine remained at 385 horsepower (287 kW; 390 PS) but torque rises from 405 to 430 lb⋅ft (549 to 583 N⋅m). Additionally, the gasoline V8 produced its maximum torque at over 700 rpm less than the previous 405 lb⋅ft (549 N⋅m) engine. The 6.7L diesel engine also remained at the same 440 horsepower (328 kW; 446 PS) but torque increased from 860 lb⋅ft (1,166 N⋅m) upwards to 925 lb⋅ft (1,254 N⋅m). The diesel engine now produced its peak torque at 1,800 rpm instead of the previous 1,600 rpm. The F-250 received a TorqShift-G six-speed automatic while all other Super Duty trucks were paired with the 6R140 6-speed automatic. Crew Cab models had a 34 US gal (130 L; 28 imp gal) tank for the 6.75-foot (2.06 m) bed and 48 US gal (180 L; 40 imp gal) fuel tank for the 8-foot (2.4 m) bed.

Trim levels consisted of the XL, XLT, Lariat, King Ranch, and Platinum. The Limited trim would not debut until 2018. The trucks were available with a two-door Regular Cab, four-door SuperCab, or four-door Crew Cab (the F-450, in pickup truck configuration, was only available in this configuration until the 2019 model year with the addition of the regular cab), with short (6' 9") and long (8') bed lengths. Base prices in the U.S. ranged from $32,535 (F-250 XL) to $77,125 (F-450 Platinum).

The 2018 F-450 was the first factory pickup truck with an MSRP of $100,000, with the addition of the new Limited trim, which debuted on the 2013 Ford F-150.

=== Engines ===
Gasoline engines
Model	Years	Type	Power at rpm	Torque at rpm
Boss SOHC V8	2017–2022	6.2 L (379 cu in) 16-valve V8	385 hp (287 kW; 390 PS) at 5,750 rpm	430 lb⋅ft (583 N⋅m) at 3,800 rpm
Triton SOHC V10 (F-450/F-550 Chassis Cab only)	2017–2019	6.8 L (412 cu in) 30-valve V10	288 hp (215 kW; 292 PS) at 4,000 rpm	424 lb⋅ft (575 N⋅m) at 3,000 rpm
Godzilla OHV V8	2020–2022	7.3 L (445 cu in) 16-valve V8	F-250/F-350 Pickup: 430 hp (321 kW; 436 PS) at 5,500 rpm Chassis Cab: 335 hp (250 kW; 340 PS) at 3,900 rpm	F-250/F-350 Pickup: 475 lb⋅ft (644 N⋅m) at 4,000 rpm Chassis Cab: 468 lb⋅ft (635 N⋅m) at 3,900 rpm

Diesel engines
Model	Years	Type	Power at rpm	Torque at rpm
6.7L Power Stroke (Ford Scorpion V8)	2017–2019	6.7 L (409 cu in) 32-valve turbocharged Diesel V8	2017: 440 hp (328 kW; 446 PS) at 2,800 rpm 2018–2019: 450 hp (336 kW; 456 PS) at 2,800 rpm	2017: 925 lb⋅ft (1,254 N⋅m) at 1,800 rpm 2018–2019: 935 lb⋅ft (1,268 N⋅m) at 1,800 rpm
6.7L Power Stroke (Ford Scorpion V8)	2020–2022	6.7 L (409 cu in) 32-valve turbocharged Diesel V8	475 hp (354 kW; 482 PS) at 2,600 rpm	1,050 lb⋅ft (1,424 N⋅m) at 1,600 rpm
6.7L Power Stroke (Ford Scorpion V8) (Chassis Cab only)	2017–2022	6.7 L (409 cu in) 32-valve turbocharged Diesel V8	330 hp (246 kW; 335 PS) at 2,600 rpm	2017-2019: 750 lb⋅ft (1,017 N⋅m) at 2,000 rpm 2020–2022: 825 lb⋅ft (1,119 N⋅m) at 2,000 rpm

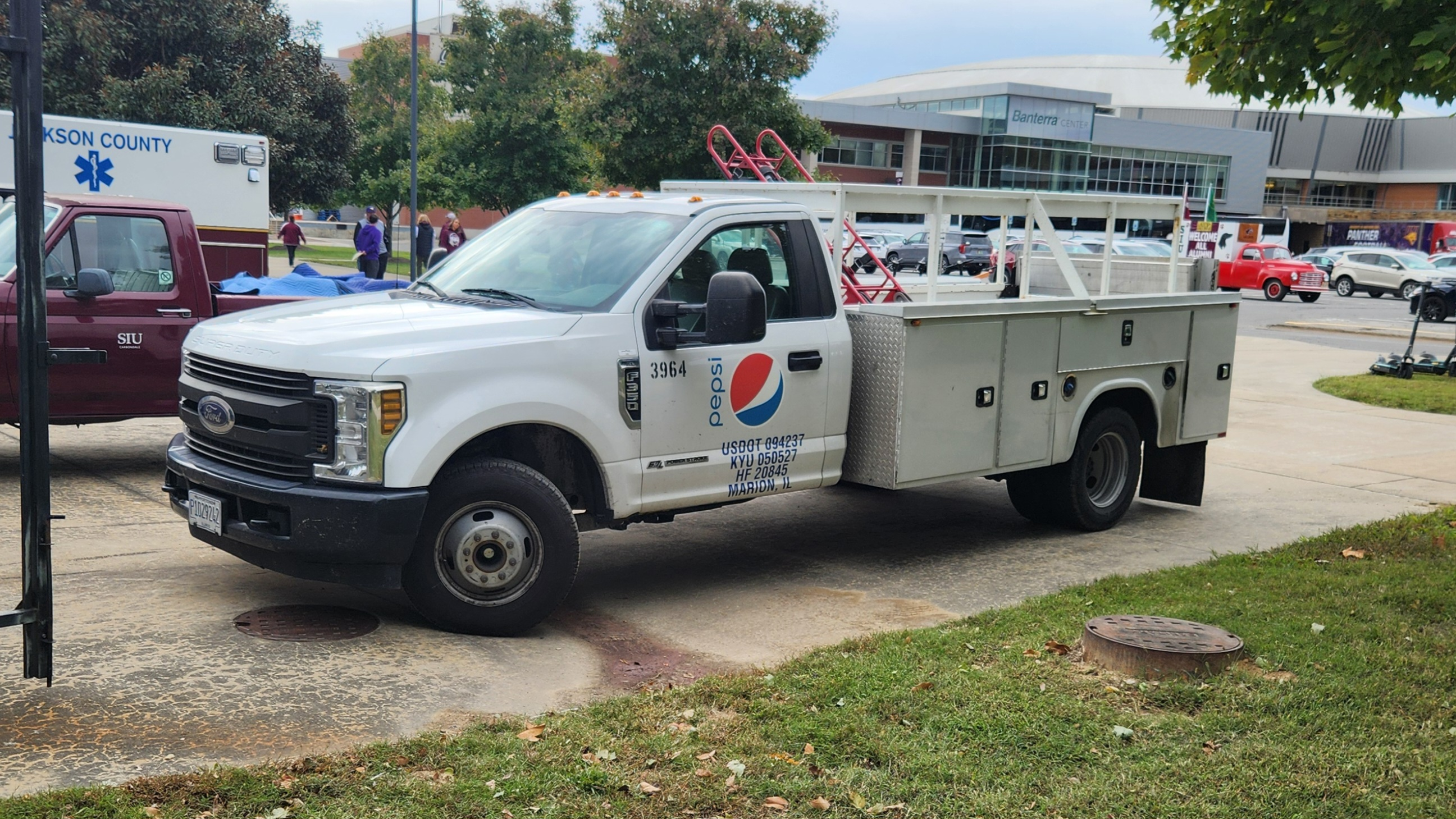
2017-2019 F-350 DRW chassis cab

All engines were paired with a "TorqShift" 6-speed automatic transmission, with the gasoline engines featuring two transmissions: a 5-speed manual transmission (chassis cab F-350, Mexico only), and Ford's all-new "TorqShift-G" automatic transmission.

=== Safety recalls ===
On April 4, 2017, all Ford F-250 Super Duty trucks built between October 1, 2015, and April 1, 2017, were recalled because of improper and damaged rods in the parking brake and transmission allowing the truck to move while in park. This affected 52,000 trucks but no injuries or accidents were reported.

=== 2020 refresh ===
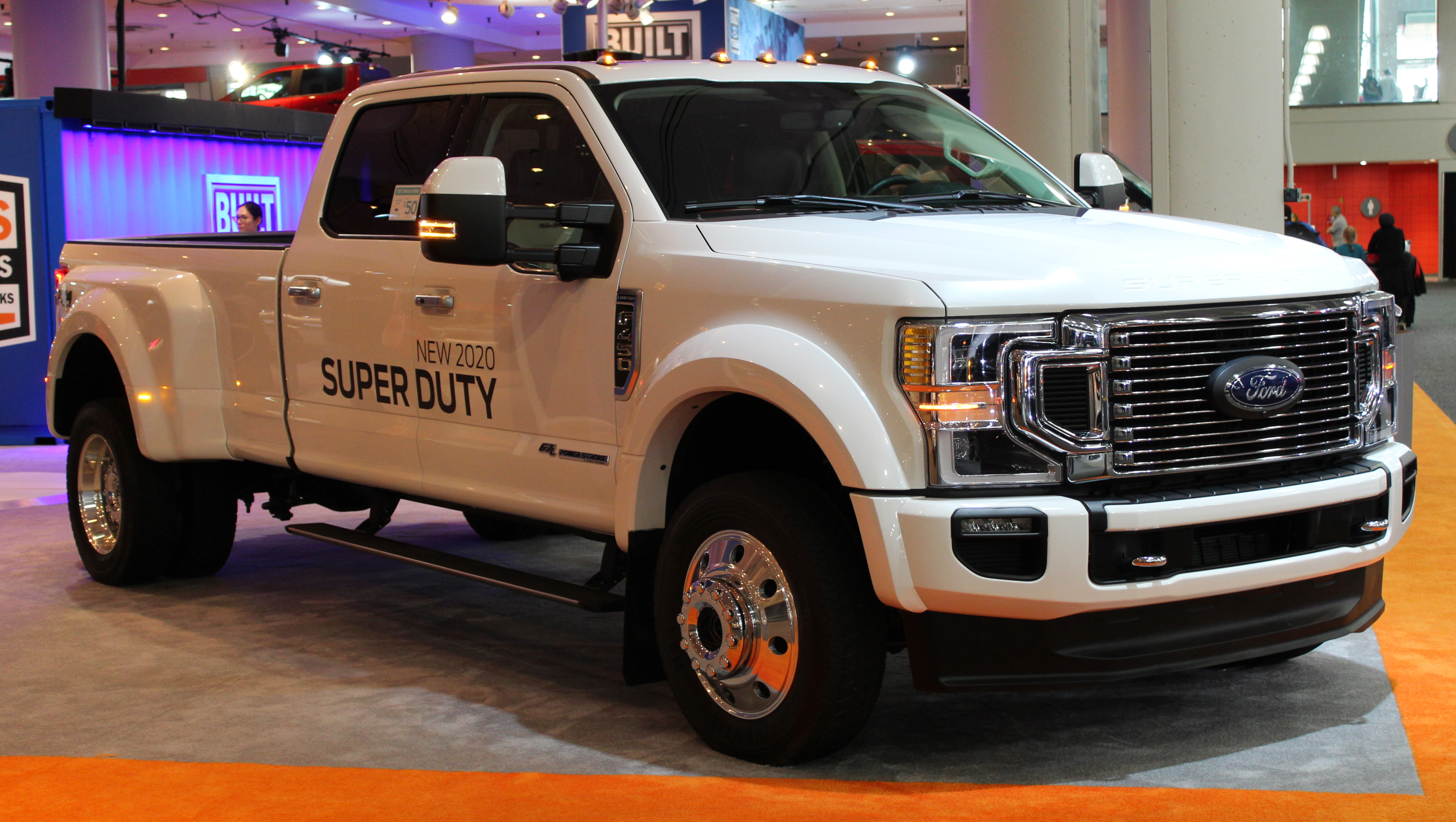
2020 F-450 Limited (front)

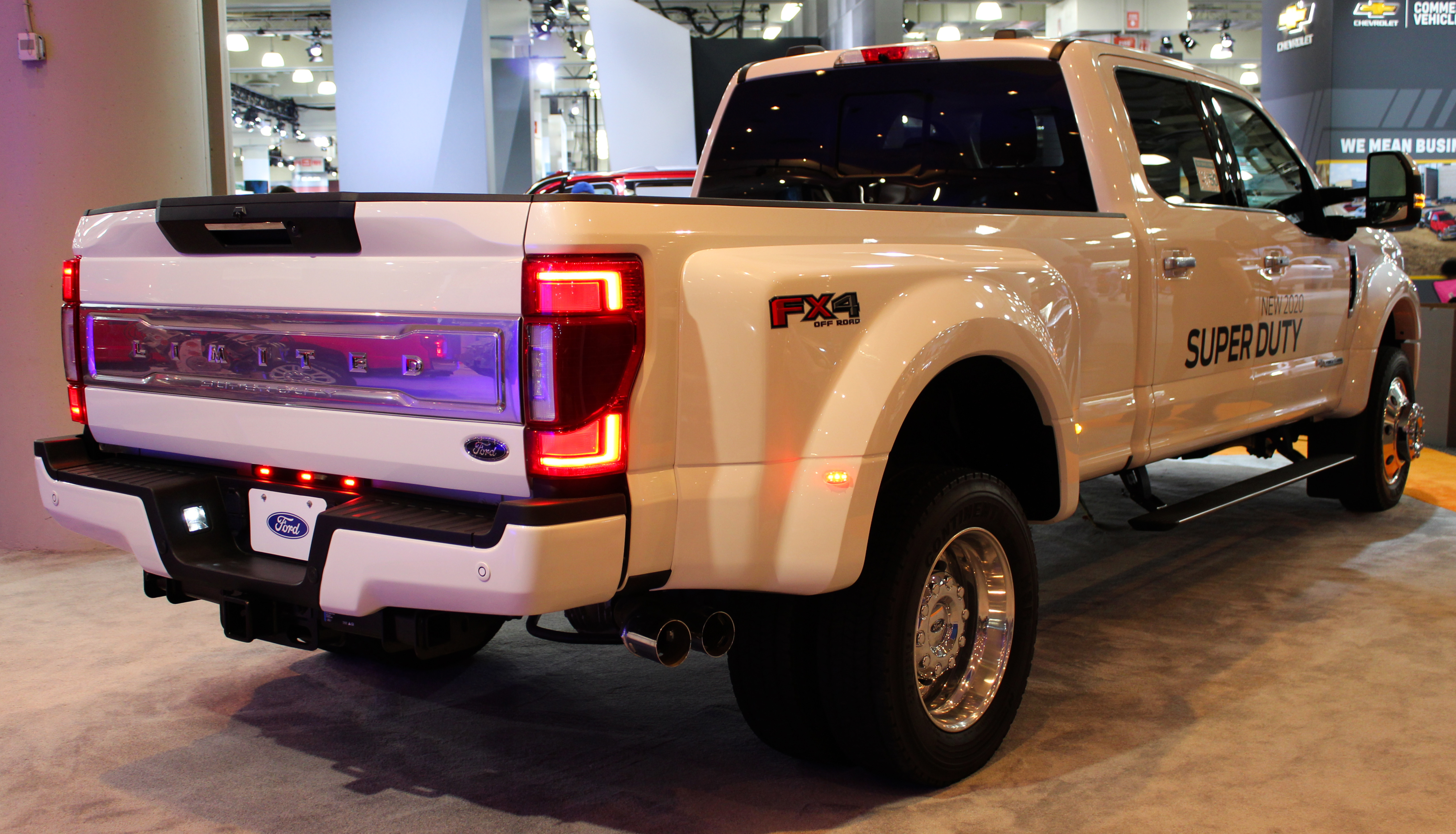
2020 F-450 Limited (rear)

The 2020 Super Duty debuted at the 2019 Chicago Auto Show in February. It featured a revised grille and tailgate design, new wheel options, and higher-quality interior materials for the Limited trim. A new 7.3-liter gasoline engine was available, nicknamed "Godzilla". Replacing the aging Triton V10, it made up to 430 horsepower and 475 lb-ft of torque. The 6.7-liter Power Stroke engine was strengthened, bumping output to 475 horsepower (354 kW; 482 PS) and 1,050 lb⋅ft (1,424 N⋅m) of torque. Ford's 10-speed 10R140 TorqShift automatic transmission was now standard with the diesel and 7.3-liter gasoline engines on the F-250 and all engines on the F-350; the 6-speed was still available, but only in the F-250 with the 6.2-liter engine and even the F-350 XL DRW with the Payload Package of the same engine (though this is a rare option).

=== 2022 hydrogen fuel cell prototype ===
An F-550 Super Duty hydrogen fuel cell electric truck is being prototyped in cooperation with Southern California Gas Co., as part of the US Department of Energy's (DOE) SuperTruck 3 program.

=== F-600 ===
For 2020, Ford reintroduced the F-600, with a name that was last used for 1994 on a medium-duty truck. Identical to the F-550, the F-600 medium-duty features the body and cab of a traditional Super Duty chassis cab but upgrades the chassis over and above the F-550 and offers no cab configurations besides a Regular Cab. The cab-to-axle options are retained. The F-600 chassis upgrades include upsized U-joints, an alteration to the diesel exhaust system to accommodate dynamic clearances for the larger U-joint crosses, upgraded brakes, and wider wheels (19×6.75" instead of 19×6") to support wider tires (245 mm instead of 225 mm) for increased tire load capacity. The model is geared towards fleet buyers who require the GVWR capacity of the heavier F-650 medium-duty but prefer the size and maneuverability of the smaller F-550 Super Duty. Available with either the 7.3L Ford Godzilla engine gasoline V8 or the 6.7L Power Stroke turbodiesel V8 engine and paired with the TorqShift 10-speed automatic transmission and two-wheel-drive (4×2) or four-wheel-drive (4×4), the F-600 went on sale in mid-2020.

- Front brakes: 15.39 inches (390.9 mm)
- Rear brakes: 15.75 inches (400.0 mm)
- Midship fuel tank capacity: 26.5 US gal (100 L; 22.1 imp gal)
- Rear tank: 40 US gal (150 L; 33 imp gal)
- GCWR: 30,000 lb (14,000 kg)
- GVWR: 22,000 lb (10,000 kg)
- Payload: 15,090 lb (6,840 kg)
- Hitch: 18,500 lb (8,400 kg)
- Front sway bar: 35 mm (1.4 in) (5160 steel)
- Rear sway bar: 31 mm (1.2 in) (5160 steel)

=== Tremor ===
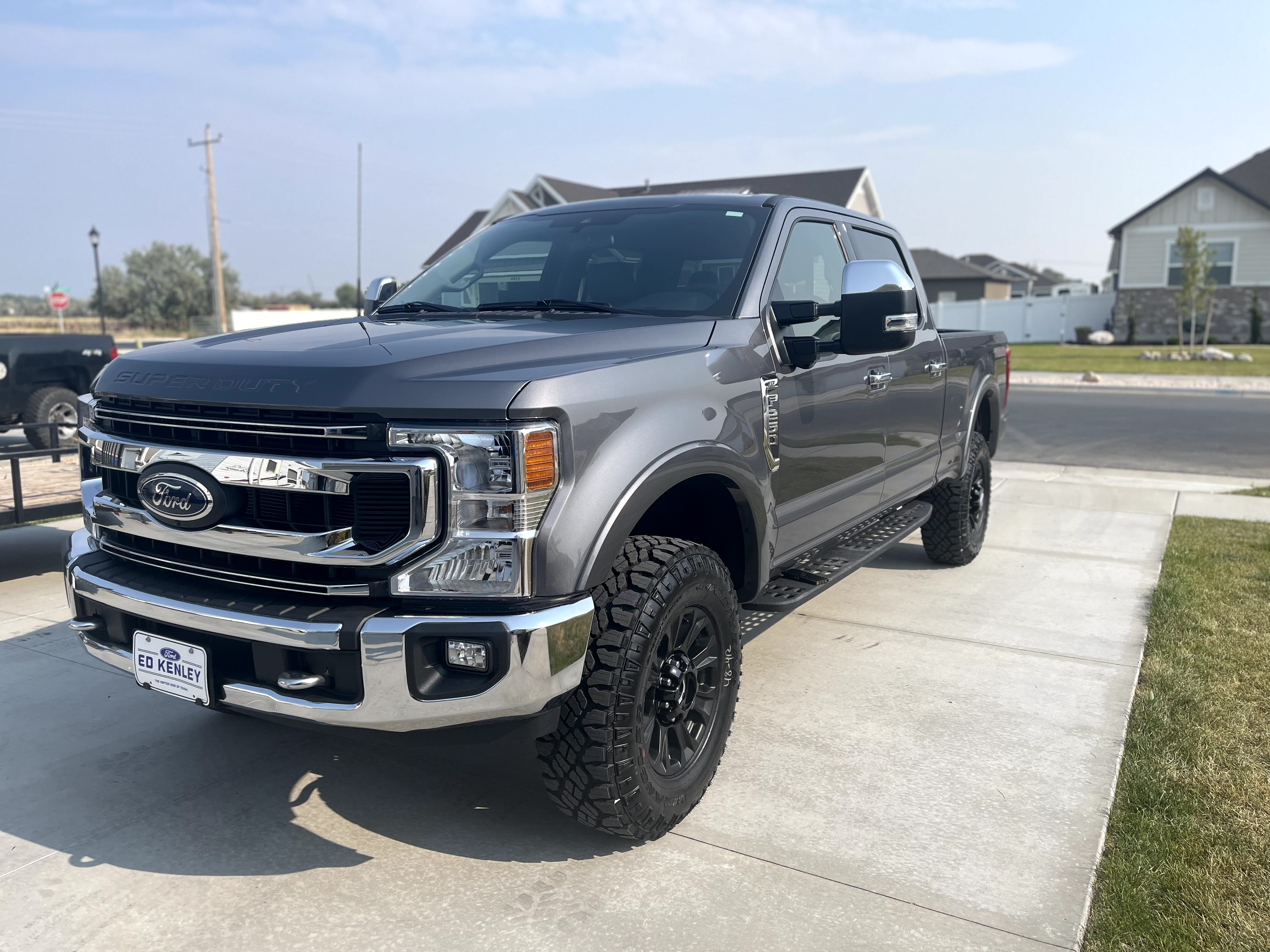
2021 F-250 Super Duty XLT Tremor

For 2020, Ford reintroduced the "Tremor" name for the F-250 and F-350 Super Duty pickups. The nameplate was last used on the 2014 Ford F-150 for a sport appearance package. As an off-road oriented version of the F-250 and F-350 Super Duty, the Tremor models competed directly with the Ram 2500 Power Wagon and feature a suspension lift and upgraded tires and wheels from the factory. The trucks also offered details not found on other Super Duty models, such as available blacked-out accents on the front grille, wheels, side emblems, and side mirrors as well as "Tremor" decals on the sides of the pickup box. Offered as a Crew Cab model with a 6 3/4-foot pickup box, and with four-wheel-drive (4×4), the Tremor came with the new 7.3L "Godzilla" gasoline V8 engine as standard, while the 6.7L Power Stroke turbodiesel V8 engine was optional (the Ram 2500 Power Wagon still only offers a gasoline V8 engine).

Off-road upgrades include 35-inch Goodyear Wrangler Duratrac maximum-traction tires, a specially tuned rear stabilizer bar, custom 1.7-inch piston twin-tube dampers, a Dana limited-slip front differential, electronic-locking rear differential, off-road running boards, large skid plates, and extended-axle vent tubes. The Super Duty Tremor Off-Road Package has a very high ground clearance of 10.8 inches (274.3 mm) and a class-leading water fording of 33 inches (838.2 mm). Also, the Super Duty Tremor Off-Road Package has the highest approach angle (31.65 degrees) and departure angle (24.51 degrees) of any Super Duty model ever built.

The new 10-speed "TorqShift" automatic transmission featured Selectable Drive Modes with settings for Deep Snow/Sand, Slippery, Eco, Tow/Haul, and Normal, as well as an exclusive Rock-Crawl mode. The Super Duty Tremor Off-Road Package also had a Trail Control feature, which is essentially cruise control for off-road driving. Crawl ratios were 53:1 for gasoline-equipped models, while the ratio for diesel-equipped models was 44:1. Another available feature for all Super Duty models (including the Tremor) was the Trailer Reverse Guidance System, which was similar to the Pro Trailer Backup Assist system in the Ford F-150 and allowed for the driver to easily back their truck and trailer with little effort. The all-new 2020 F-250 and F-350 Super Duty Tremor models went on sale in the fall of 2019.

== Fifth generation (2023–present) ==
Fifth generation (P708)
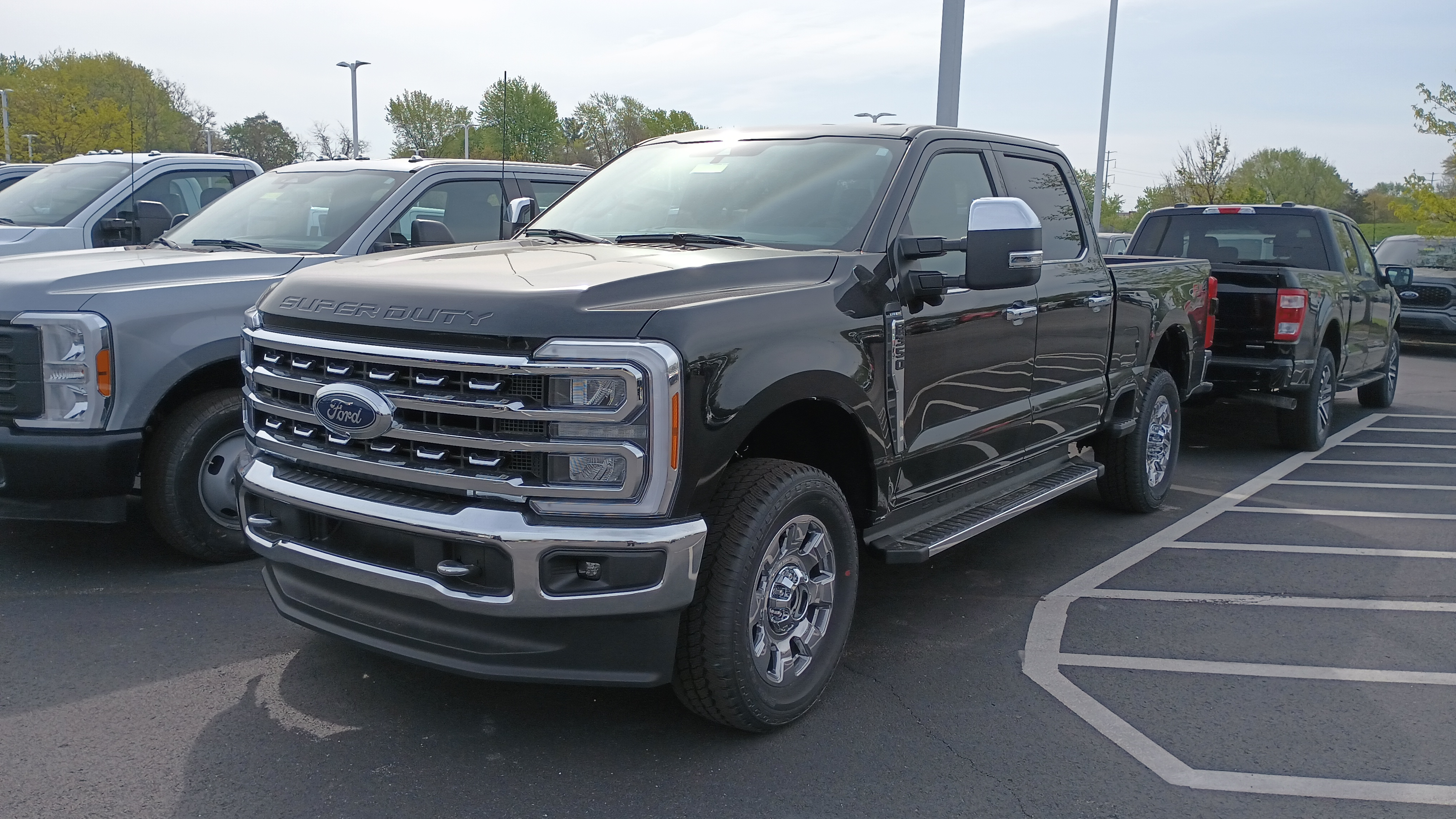
- 2023 Ford F-350 SRW Lariat Crew Cab

Overview
- Production: 2023–present
- Model years: 2023–present
- Assembly: Louisville, Kentucky (Kentucky Truck Assembly) (pickups and chassis-cabs); Avon Lake, Ohio (Ohio Assembly) (chassis-cabs only)

Body and chassis
- Body style: 2-door regular cab 4-door extended cab (SuperCab); 4-door crew cab
- Chassis: Pickup truck (F-250, F-350, F-450, F-550); Chassis cab (F-350, F-450, F-550, F-600)
- Related: Ford F-Series (fourteenth generation)

Powertrain
- Engine: Gasoline: 6.8 L Godzilla OHV V8; 7.3 L Godzilla OHV V8; Diesel: 6.7 L Power Stroke Turbodiesel V8 6.7 L Power Stroke Turbodiesel V8; (High-Output)
- Transmission: 10-speed automatic 10R100 (6.8L); 10-speed automatic 10R140 (7.3L and 6.7L Power Stroke)
- Plug-in charging: V2L: 2 kW

The fifth-generation Super Duty was revealed in September 2022. Production started in early 2023. Just like its predecessor, this generation of Super Duty shares much of the cab and interior with the contemporary F-150.

Two new engine options were introduced. The new 6.8L gasoline V8, which is essentially a short-stroked version of the 7.3L Godzilla, is standard and was initially only available on F-250 and F-350 pickup models with the base XL trim. A high-output version of the 6.7L Power Stroke diesel, producing up to 500 horsepower and 1,200 lb-ft of torque, is available on all pickup models and is included with the Limited trim. The 7.3L Godzilla is standard on higher trims of the F-250 and F-350 pickups, is available on the XL trim (but only with the STX package, which is not available with dual rear wheels), and is the only gasoline engine option for F-350 through F-600 chassis-cab models. All engines are paired to a 10-speed automatic transmission. Four-wheel drive is standard on XLT and higher trims on pickups as well as on the Lariat trim on chassis-cabs.

For 2024, the 6.8L V8 gained flex-fuel capability, and was now available on F-250 and F-350 pickups with the XLT trim.

For 2025, the 6.8L V8 was now available on F-250 and F-350 pickups with the Lariat trim. Lariat models were now exclusively available in Crew Cab and used a synthetic seating material dubbed "ActiveX" instead of leather. The F-250 and F-350 SuperCab pickups were now only available with the 8' bed, riding on a 164" wheelbase, and with single rear wheels. Just like in the 2024 F-150 refresh, the Sport Appearance Package was replaced with the Black Appearance Package, and the Limited trim was replaced with the Platinum Plus package.

Additional updates for 2025 included the introduction of the Ford Pro Vehicle Integration System (FVIS) 2.0, designed to improve compatibility with aftermarket equipment and fleet upfitting. Trailer technology was also expanded, with enhanced blind-spot coverage for longer trailers and optional tire-pressure monitoring for towed units. The exterior color range was revised with the addition of Avalanche Gray and Ruby Red Metallic Tinted Clearcoat, while the Sport Appearance Package was discontinued in favor of a new Black Appearance Package. All Super Duty models continued to be equipped with the 10-speed TorqShift automatic transmission. Ford revealed the 2027 Super Duty Carhartt Edition on May 7, 2026 with orders starting fall 2026, the package is exclusively available on XLT optioned with 4x4 and the 6 3/4 ft bed for 2027, the Tremor off road package is available with the 8 ft bed and the base XL, the longer bed will have a 48 gallon tank.

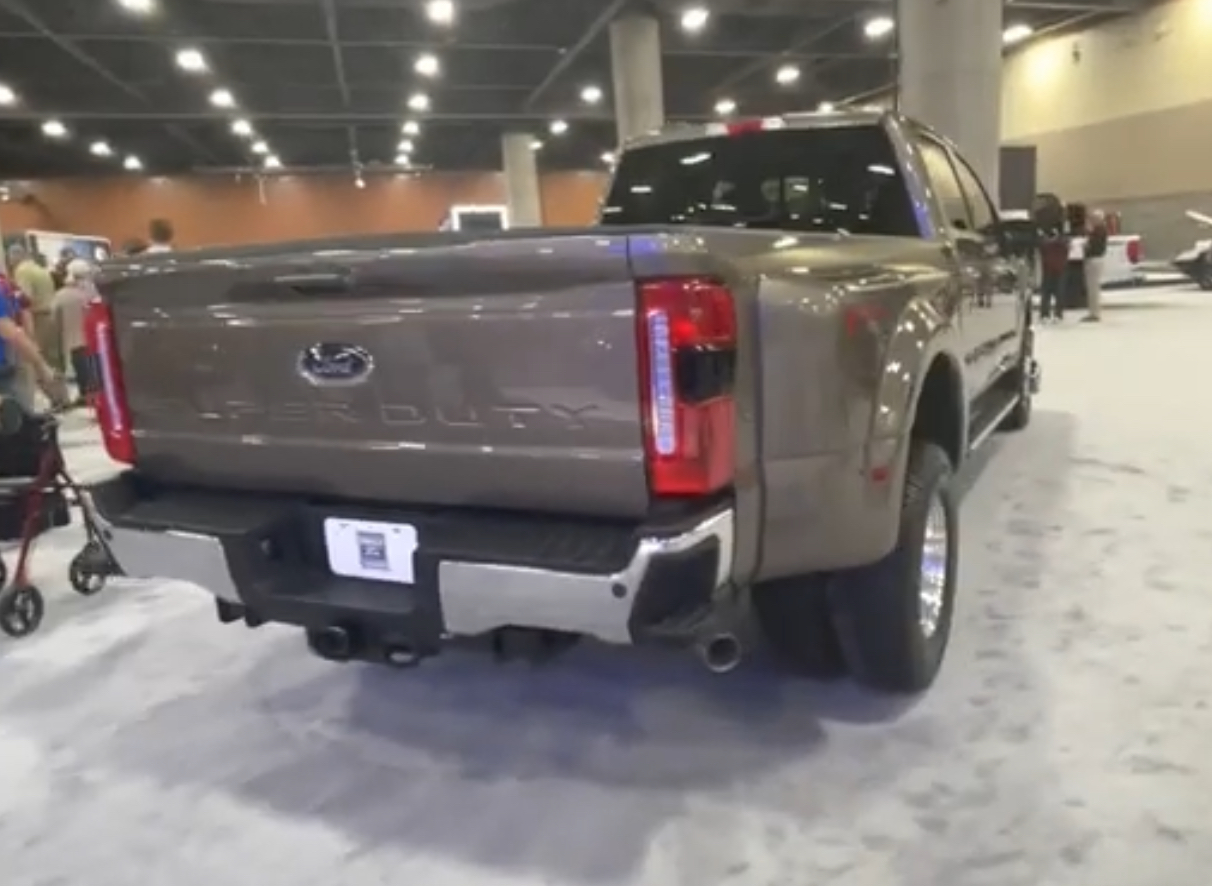
2023 Ford F-350 DRW rear view

=== Engines ===
Gasoline engines
Model	Years	Type	Power at rpm	Torque at rpm
Godzilla OHV V8 (F-250/F-350 Pickup only)	2023–2026	6.8 L (415 cu in) 16-valve V8	405 hp (302 kW) at 5,000 rpm	445 lb⋅ft (603 N⋅m) at 4,000 rpm
Godzilla OHV V8	2023–	7.3 L (445 cu in) 16-valve V8	2023–2026 F-250/F-350 Pickup: 430 hp (321 kW) at 5,500 rpm 2027– F-250/F-350 Pickup: 420 hp (313 kW) at 5,350 rpm 2023–2026 Chassis Cab: 335 hp (250 kW) at 3,750 rpm 2027– Chassis Cab: 310 hp (231 kW) at 3,800 rpm	2023–2026 F-250/F-350 Pickup: 485 lb⋅ft (658 N⋅m) at 4,000 rpm 2027– F-250/F-350 Pickup: 445 lb⋅ft (603 N⋅m) at 4,250 rpm 2023–2026 Chassis Cab: 468 lb⋅ft (635 N⋅m) at 3,750 rpm at 3,500 rpm 2027– Chassis Cab: 441 lb⋅ft (598 N⋅m) at 1,800 rpm

Diesel engines
Model	Years	Type	Power at rpm	Torque at rpm
6.7L Power Stroke	2023– (Note: Pickup: 2023–2026; Chassis Cab: 2023–)	6.7 L (409 cu in) 32-valve turbocharged Diesel V8	Pickup: 475 hp (354 kW) at 2,600–2,800 rpm Chassis Cab: 330 hp (246 kW) at 2,200 rpm	Pickup: 1,050 lb⋅ft (1,424 N⋅m) at 1,600 rpm Chassis Cab: 950 lb⋅ft (1,288 N⋅m) at 1,800 rpm
6.7L Power Stroke High Output (Pickup only)	2023–	6.7 L (409 cu in) 32-valve turbocharged Diesel V8	500 hp (373 kW) at 2,600 rpm	1,200 lb⋅ft (1,627 N⋅m) at 1,600 rpm

== Marketing ==
As of 2016, the Ford Super Duty is sold in the United States, Canada, Mexico, Venezuela (F-250 and F-350), Suriname, Brazil (F-350/F-4000), Argentina (F-4000 only), Angola (F-250 and F-350), Cambodia, the Middle East, and Iceland (F-350 only) in left-hand drive (LHD) only.

In Suriname, though traffic is on the left side of the road, the import and registry of left-hand-drive vehicles is allowed.

In Australia, it was officially imported in right-hand drive from Brazil from 2001 to 2006.

== Variants ==
=== Medium-duty trucks (F-650 and F-750) ===
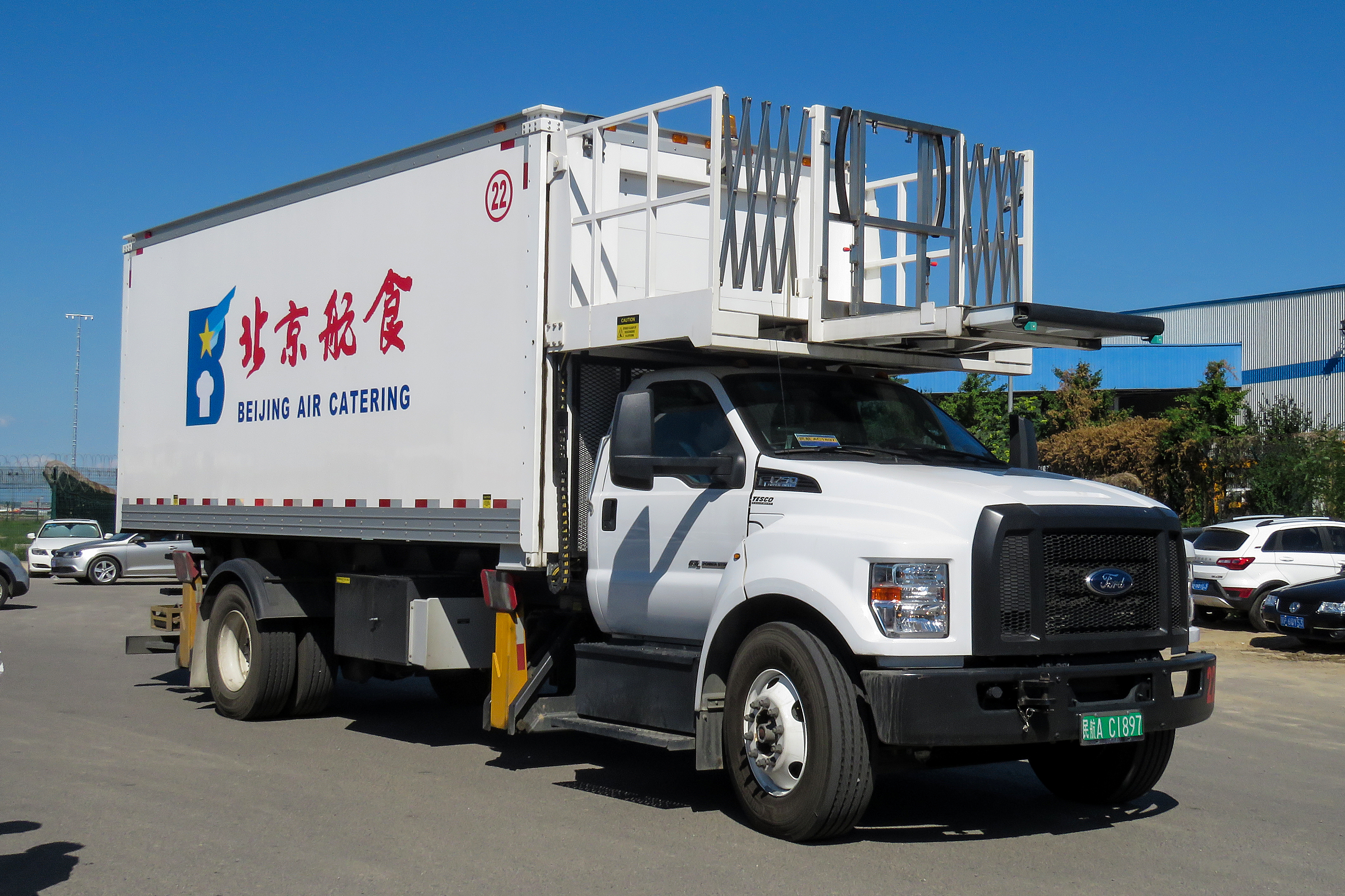
2016 Ford F-750 Super Duty

For 2000, Ford returned to the Class 6–7 truck market as it expanded the Super Duty line into the medium-duty segment. They developed a joint venture with Navistar International known as Blue Diamond Trucks, the F-650 and F-750 Super Duty were assembled in Mexico. While the chassis and other components would be common to both manufacturers, Ford and International would each source their own bodywork and powertrain; the cab for the Ford trucks would be common with other Super Duty models.

For the 2016 model year, the medium-duty truck range was given a major upgrade, following the end of the joint venture and the shift of production to the United States. In place of outsourced engines and transmissions, the 2016 F-650 and F-750 now use a 6.8L gasoline V10, a 6.7L Power Stroke diesel V8, and a 6-speed automatic transmission all supplied by Ford.

=== Sport-utility vehicles ===
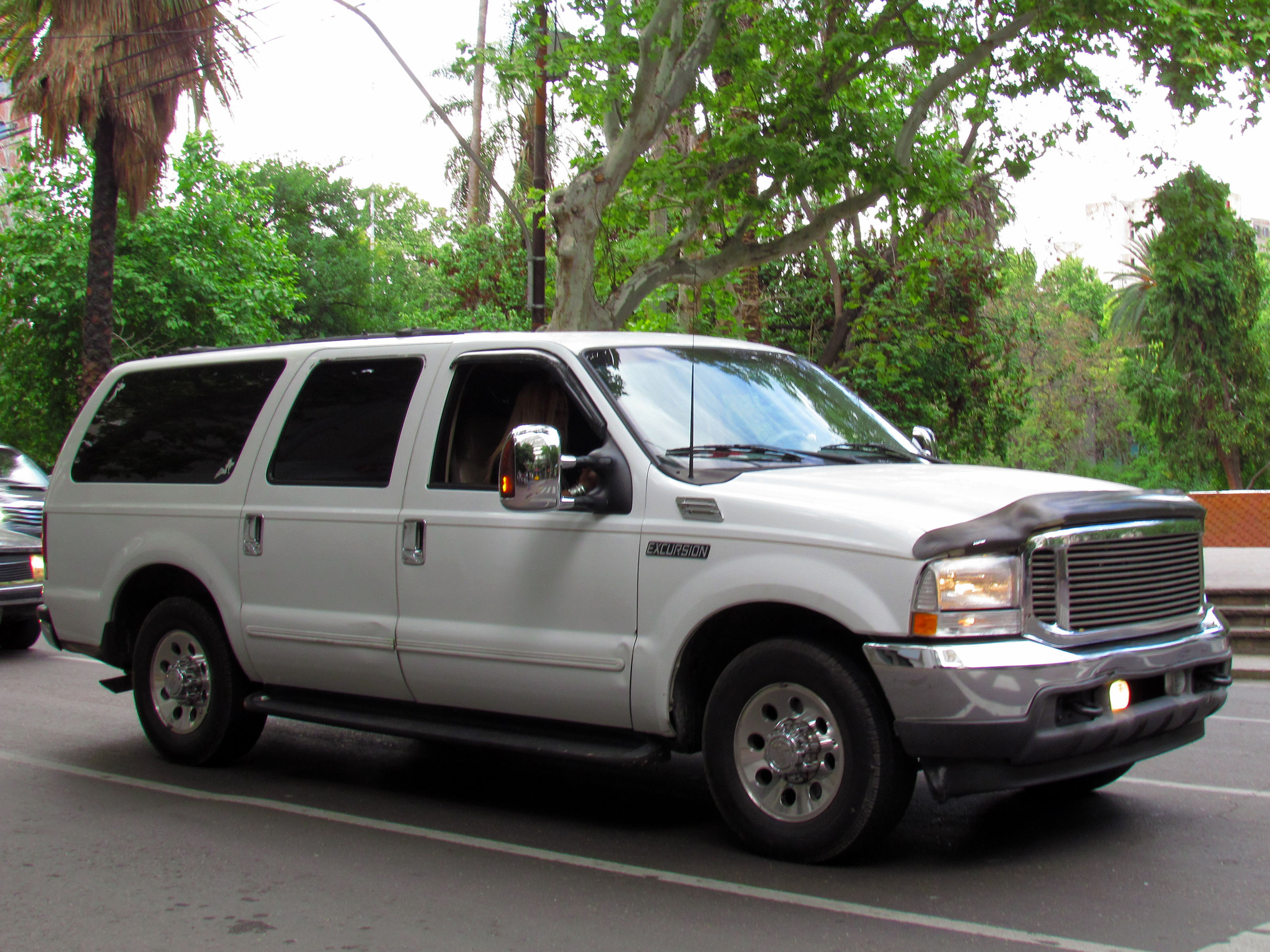
2004 Ford Excursion XLT

From 2000 to 2005, the F-250 Super Duty served as a basis for the Ford Excursion sport-utility vehicle. Along with the Chevrolet Suburban (and its Cadillac/GMC/Holden counterparts) and the International Harvester Travelall, the Ford Excursion was one of the longest non-limousine sport-utility vehicles ever sold.

The Excursion was available in three trim packages: XLT, Limited, and top-of-the-line Eddie Bauer. It was offered in two- or four-wheel drive, and with three engine options: the 5.4L V8, the 6.8L V10, or the Power Stroke V8 turbo diesel. The Excursion was only available with an automatic transmission.

While the Excursion was sold mostly in North America, a similar vehicle was sold in Brazil from 1998 to 2012 as a second-party conversion of the Ford F-250 crew-cab (similar to the Centurion F-Series/Bronco conversions).

=== Armored vehicles (F-550) ===
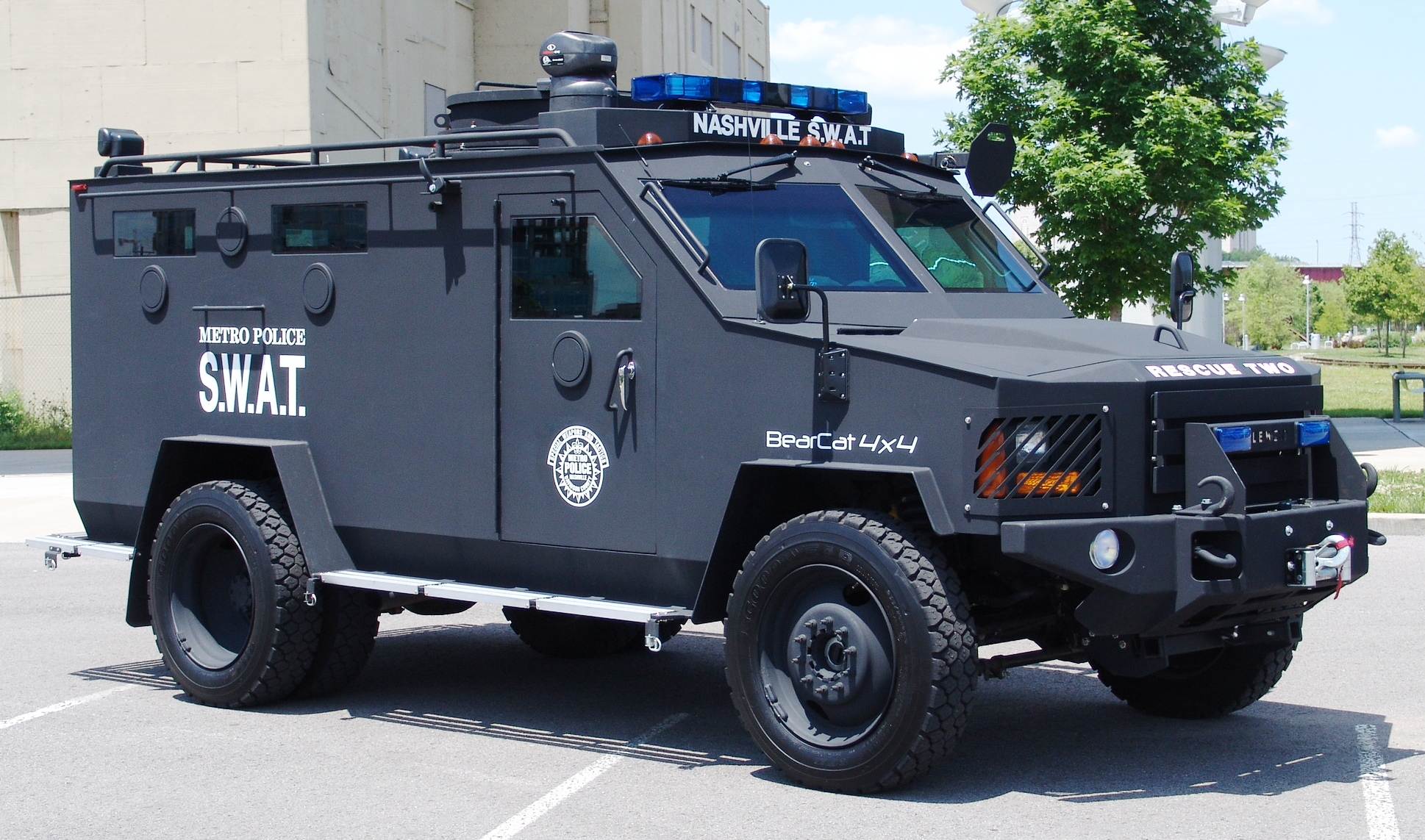
Lenco BearCat 4×4 armored personnel carrier

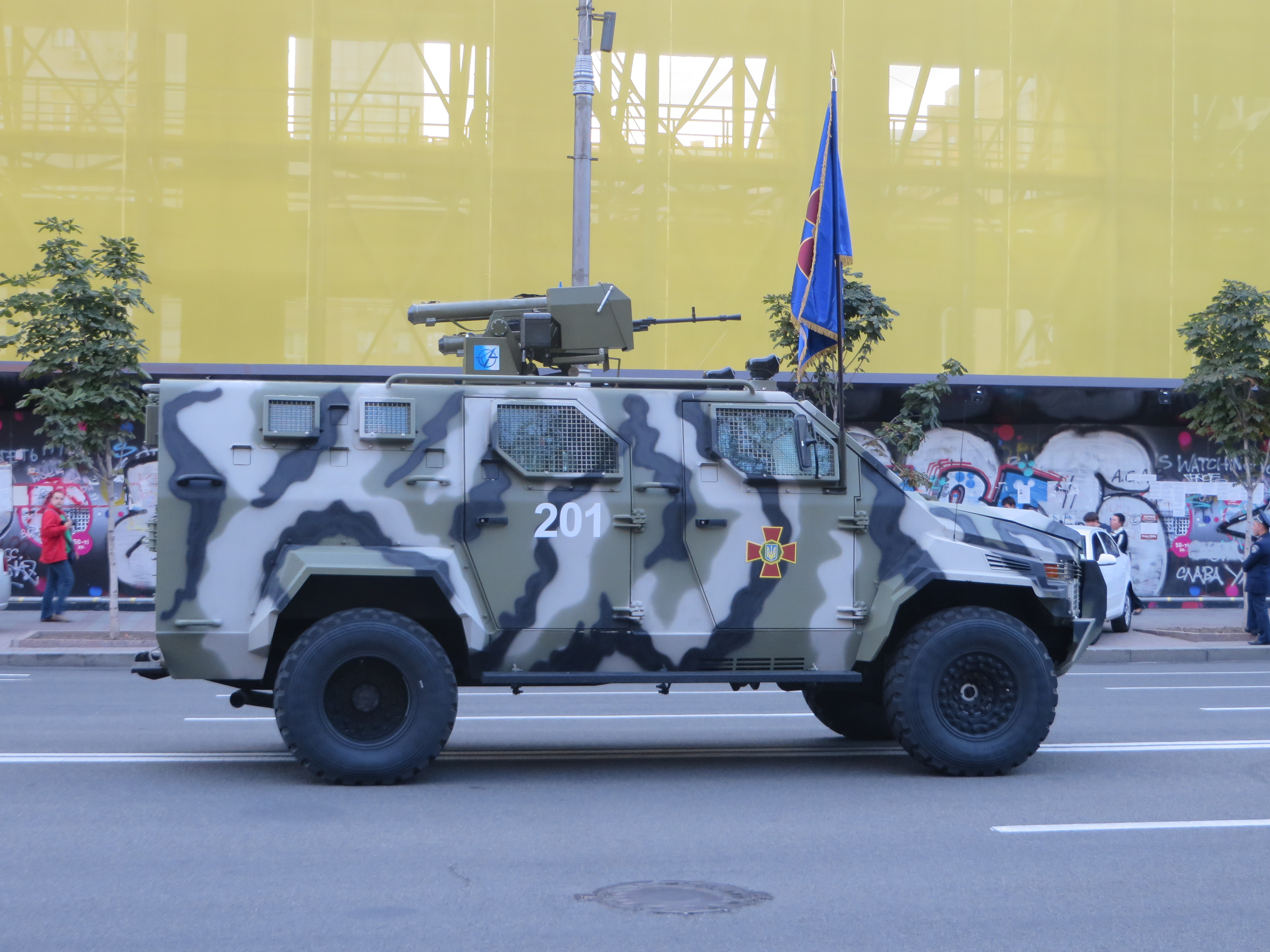
Ukrainian KrAZ Spartan with RK-3 Corsar ATGM installed

As a result of the heavy-duty frame and powertrain of its chassis, the Ford Super Duty has served as a donor platform for multiple types of armored vehicles, for civilian, law enforcement, and military use. Most versions are constructed using the Ford F-550 chassis cab. Examples include the STREIT/KrAZ Spartan, Didgori-2, Lenco BearCat, Plasan Sand Cat, Roshel Senator, Terradyne Gurkha, Ukrainian Armor Novator, Conquest Knight XV, TAD Turangga, and TIMAK SHOTA. In China, the F-550 chassis based "Saber tooth tiger" is widely used by the police. According to its manufacturer, the vehicle can withstand M16 and AK-47 rounds, has multiple gun ports, a top speed of 130 km/h, a maximum occupancy of 10 personnel and a cost of 2 million yuan (US$298,830).

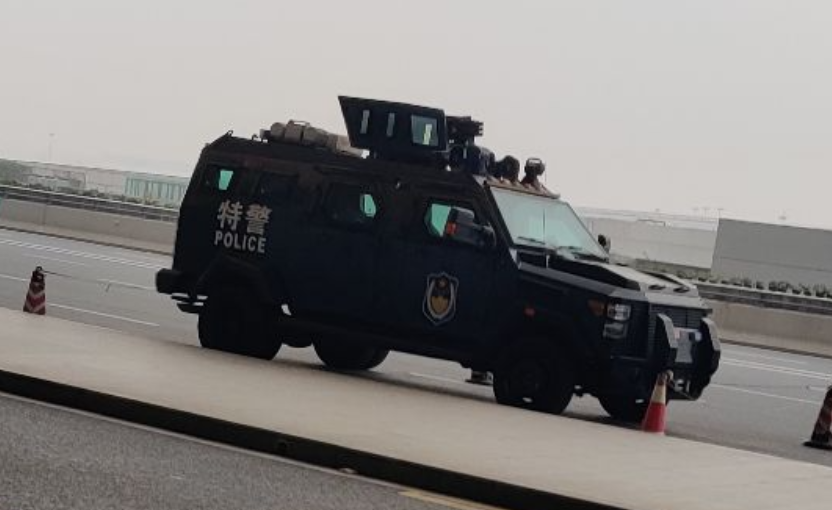
Chengdu police Saber Tooth Tiger SWAT truck

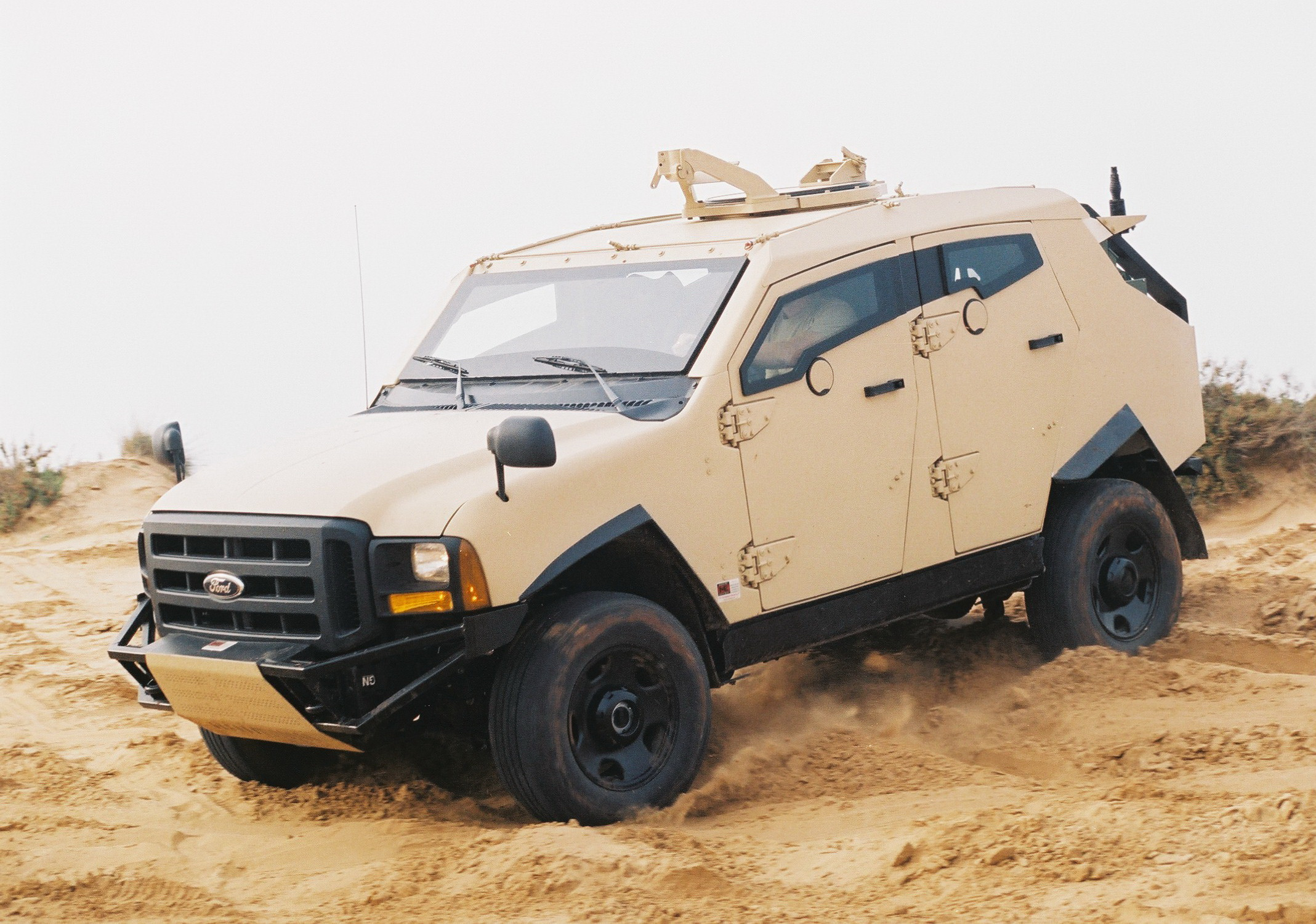
Plasan SandCat

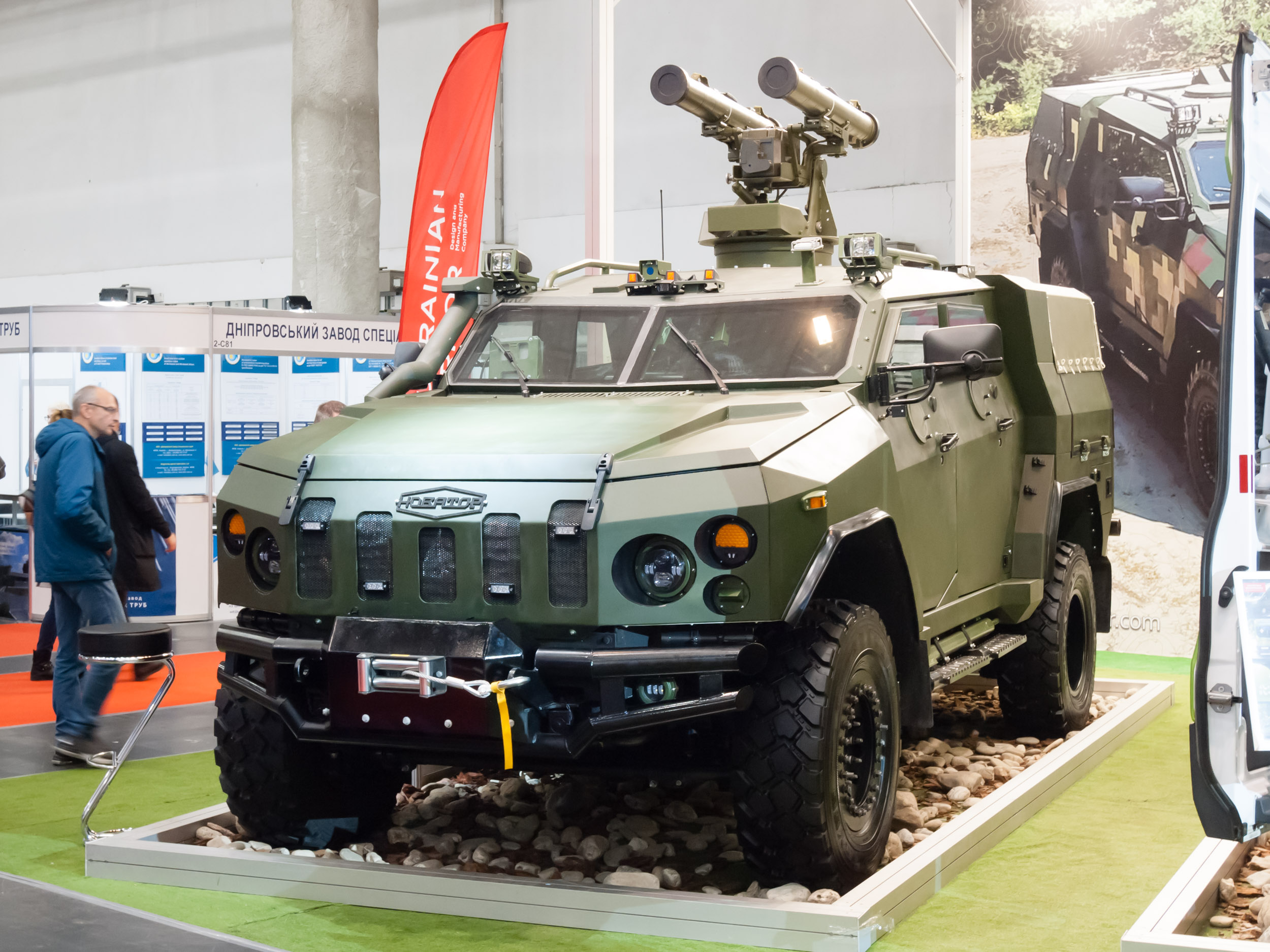
Novator armored car by Ukrainian Armor (Ukraine)

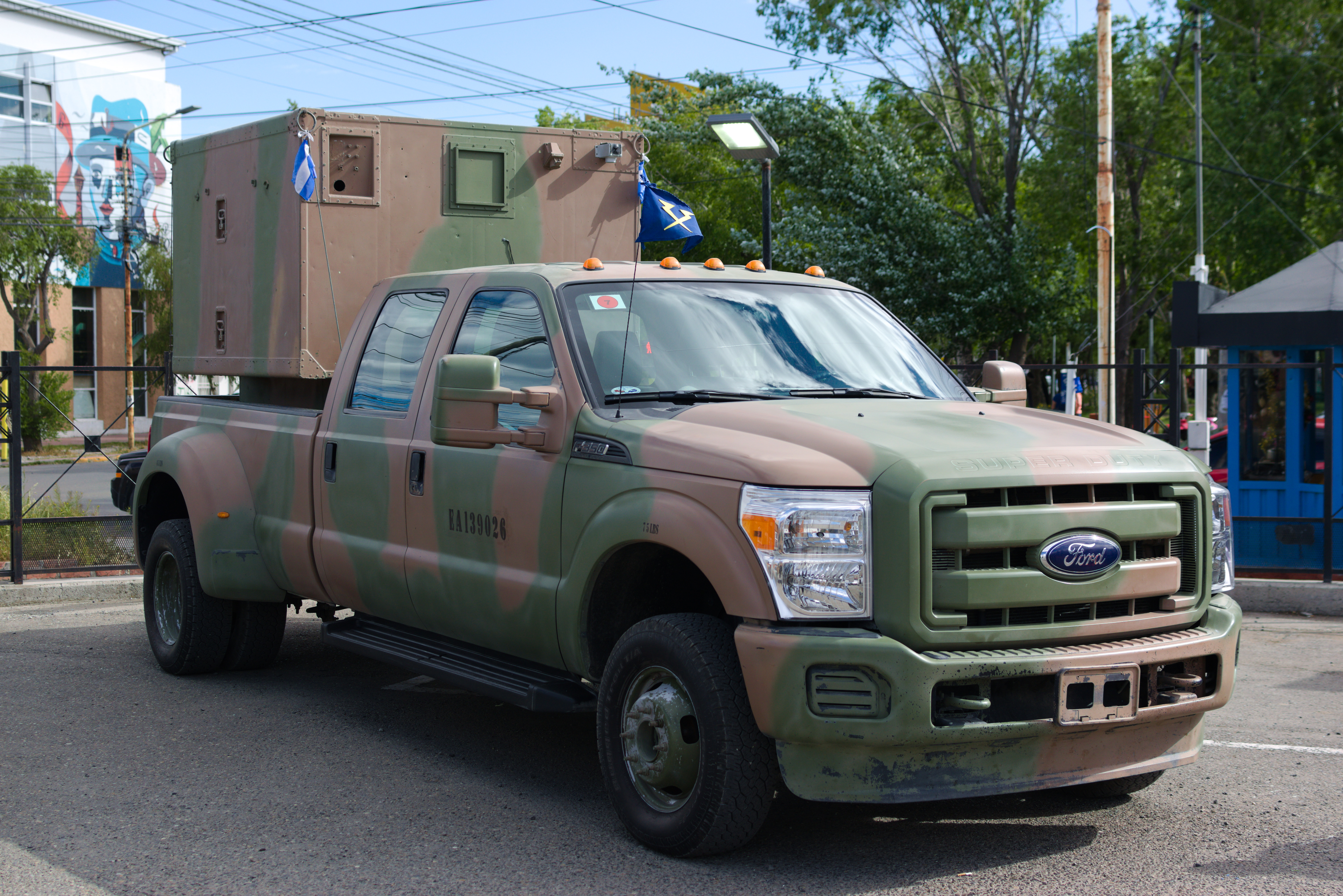
Ford Super Duty in military configuration for the Argentine armed forces

== See also ==
- Ford F-Series – Overview of Ford full-size truck range
  - Ford F-Series (medium-duty) – medium-duty (Class 6–8) commercial trucks
  - Ford F-150 – standard light-duty F-Series
- Ford Excursion – SUV variant of F-250 Super Duty
- Ford Super Duty engine – V8 truck engines and previous use of Super Duty name (1958–1981)
