= 180 Degrees South: Conquerors of the Useless =

- Theatrical poster
- Directed by: Chris Malloy
- Written by: Daniel Moder; Chris Malloy; Rick Ridgeway; Zachary Slobig; Steven Barilotti
- Produced by: Tim Lynch; Emmett Malloy; Rick Ridgeway
- Starring: Yvon Chouinard; Doug Tompkins; Jeff Johnson; Keith Malloy; Makohe; Timmy O'Neill
- Cinematography: Daniel Moder
- Edited by: Tim Wheeler
- Music by: Ugly Casanova; Mason Jennings; James Mercer
- Production company: Woodshed Films Inc.
- Distributed by: Magnolia Pictures; Red Envelope Entertainment
- Release date: February 10, 2010 (Santa Barbara)
- Running time: 85 minutes
- Country: United States
- Language: English

180 Degrees South: Conquerors of the Useless, or simply 180° South, is a 2010 documentary directed by Chris Malloy that covers the journey of Jeff Johnson as he travels from Ventura, California to Patagonia, Chile. He retraces the 1968 trip that Yvon Chouinard and Doug Tompkins took in their Ford E-Series Econoline Van with the end goal of climbing Fitz Roy, one of the more difficult climbs in the Andes. After finding footage of the 1968 expedition, Johnson decided to make climbing the Corcovado Volcano in Patagonia his own goal and, after speaking to Chouinard and Tompkins, planned his own journey.

The subtitle of the film comes from Lionel Terray's mountaineering autobiography, Les Conquérants de l'inutile or Conquistadors of the Useless (1961). Terray was the first to summit Fitz Roy, in 1952, and his book was influential with Chouinard and Tompkins.

== Synopsis ==
The film emulates the 1968 trip made by Yvon Chouinard and Doug Tompkins to Patagonia, but rather than by land, Jeff Johnson travels by sea from Mexico and south along the west coast of Chile. The film opens with original home movie footage as taken by Chouinard and Tompkins, and then continues with Johnson's own footage, in which he includes surfing, sailing and climbing as the film follows Johnson signing on with a small boat heading for Chile, his being delayed for several weeks on Easter Island, his meeting travel partner Makohe, and in his reaching Patagonia, Johnson meeting with Chouinard and Tompkins. The film concludes with his attempt to climb Cerro Corcovado (the Corcovado volcano), an attempt that was halted 200 feet from the summit out of concerns for safety.

== Cast ==
- Yvon Chouinard
- Doug Tompkins
- Kris Tompkins
- Jeff Johnson
- Keith Malloy
- Makohe
- Timmy O'Neill

== Release ==
The film debuted February 10, 2010 at the Santa Barbara International Film Festival, followed in April 2010 by limited theatrical release, as well as festival screenings at the Newport Beach International Film Festival. The film was released on DVD and Blu-ray in June 2010, followed by additional festival screenings in September 2010 at the Asbury Park Independent Film Festival, in November 2010 at the Banff Film Festival and Save the Waves Film Festival. The film had theatrical release in Japan in January 2011.

== Reception ==
Seattle Post Globe wrote "180° South is a thinking person’s adventure film, one that stimulates the mind rather that the adrenal gland," in that it "is not one of those extreme sports movies set to heavy metal music in which daredevils boast of pitting themselves against nature." The reviewer notes that while the film instead has a message of conservationism, the director "does not pitch this conservation message in a fit of hysterical propaganda, as have the directors of so many ecological horror documentaries on topics ranging from global warming to the corn syrup in our peanut butter." He writes "The regard for the planet shown in 180° South comes from the quiet, philosophical nature of the people profiled in the film, who realize there is more adventure in the preservation of nature than in its conquering."

Minneapolis Star-Tribune praised the film by writing "If you are this close to chucking it all in, packing your bags and going vagabond, by all means do not see "180° South." Director Chris Malloy's eco-tourist documentary could stoke your wanderlust to the point of no return." They noted that the cinematography tended to meander at times and did not allow the viewer to learn much about Johnson himself, but that the film began to "brighten" after Johnson meets with Chouinard and Tompkins at the wildlife preserve that Tompkins founded in Patagonia in 1991.

Spectrum wrote that the beginning of the film was deceptive in that its initial "Conversations of high adventure spliced between footage of rock climbing, surfing and mountaineering may easily trick the viewer into thinking this is a film about extreme sports," but that the "main clue that hints at a different purpose is the chill sound track." They expanded that it was not until after Johnson's unscheduled delay on Easter Island that viewers "first learn what 180° South is most obviously about," when "the theme of ecological conservation is played out in conversations about national parks, hydro-electric dams, indigenous wildlife, sustainable farming, consumerism, commercial fishing, reforestation and even development models." They note that the final two-thirds of the film shares the "intrinsic tension between conservation on the one hand and the mass-produced technological innovations that make the trip and film possible on the other".

The Washington Post writes "Chris Malloy's film strikes so deeply into the heart of Patagonia's wilderness we come to feel at home there".

== Soundtrack ==
180° South Soundtrack

Soundtrack album by Various Artists
- Released: May 6, 2010
- Genre: Indie rock
- Length: 39:10
- Label: Brushfire Records

Modest Mouse singer Isaac Brock's side project Ugly Casanova contributed nine songs, while James Mercer of The Shins and Broken Bells contributed two songs. Emmett Malloy, director of the White Stripes documentary Under Great White Northern Lights, assembled the soundtrack. Jack Johnson and Mason Jennings also contributed songs.

Per Mercer, "I was invited to come down to Chile while they were filming it because they thought that I might be able to write some music for it. I worked with Isaac Brock on it. We just kind of watched footage after I came back and got inspired and we put together some music."

No.	Title	Artist(s)	Length
1.	"Mountains of Storms"	Ugly Casanova	1:37
2.	"Here's to Now"	Ugly Casanova	2:51
3.	"Machines"	Mason Jennings	3:57
4.	"Doug's Theme"	James Mercer	1:51
5.	"Wave Goodbye"	Ugly Casanova	2:39
6.	"Journey Through the Past"	James Mercer	3:47
7.	"Lonesome Blues"	Ugly Casanova	0:51
8.	"Hotcha Girls"	Ugly Casanova	1:34
9.	"Spring Wind"	Jack Johnson	3:47
10.	"Maybe We're Lost"	Ugly Casanova	2:10
11.	"Corcovado"	Ugly Casanova	3:14
12.	"Coconut Flakes"	Love as Laughter	5:39
13.	"The Geezer"	Ugly Casanova	1:32
14.	"Lay Me Down"	Ugly Casanova	3:41
