= Alicia Ika =

Chilean actress (born 1976)

- Makohe
- Born: Alicia Salomé Acuña Ika; October 8, 1976 (age 48); Hanga Roa, Easter Island, Chile
- Occupation(s): Actress, musician, surf instructor
- Spouse: Marcus Edensky (2012-present)
- Children: 3

Alicia "Makohe" Ika (born October 8, 1976) is a Rapa Nui actress, musician, surf instructor and tourist agent. She was born to a Rapanui mother and a Chilean father. Alicia received international fame, particularly in the climbing and surfing community, after appearing in the documentary sports drama 180° South in 2010.

After having dedicated the earlier years of her adult life to wave surfing, her always present interest in music grew stronger. In 2003, in a time when she lived in Hawai'i, Makohe started singing professionally. Two years later, when she returned to Rapa Nui, she introduced a new sound to the Rapa Nui music culture with her Hawai'ian influences and partially falsetto voice. Having inherited her mother's singing voice and being the first female artist of the island she quickly became an acknowledged artist.

Bringing outside influences to Easter Island, she brought the idea of teaching surf when she opened up the island's first surf school in 2005. Having originally learned surfing from her brothers, she was then the only female surfer in the Easter Island waves, which at first caused controversy. After having had a strong presence in the local surfing community, several women later followed her example. Today, being a female surfer is socially accepted in the Easter Island surfing community.

Alicia Ika currently has two released CD's: Hokorua and Te 'Ua Te Tokerau. Hokorua is a mix between covers of traditional Rapa Nui music and her own songs, while Te 'Ua Te Tokerau solely consists of her own original songs.

In 2014, she appeared with family in House Hunters International on HGTV.

== Filmography ==
- Iorana (1998)
- 180° South (2010)
- House Hunters International (2014)
