= Ford E-Series =

American van series manufactured by Ford

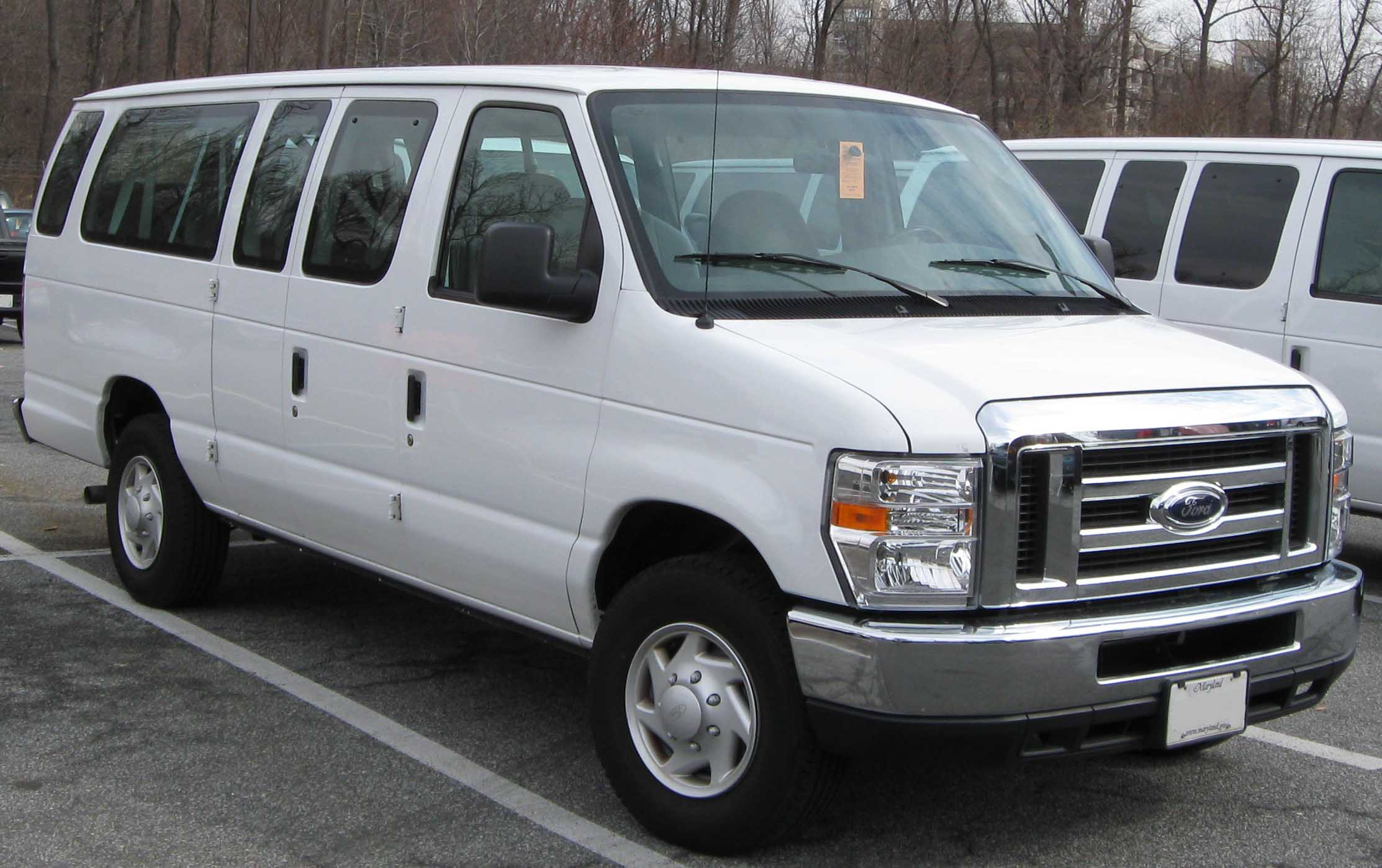
- Ford E-Series passenger van

Overview
- Manufacturer: Ford Motor Company
- Production: 1960–present
- Model years: 1961–present
- Assembly: United States: Avon Lake, Ohio (Ohio Assembly); Lorain, Ohio (Lorain Assembly, closed 2005); Canada: Oakville, Ontario (Oakville Assembly)

Body and chassis
- Class: Full-size van

Chronology
- Predecessor: Ford F-series panel truck
- Successor: Ford Transit (for van variant)

The Ford E-Series (also marketed as the Ford Econoline and Ford Club Wagon) is a range of full-size vans produced by the Ford Motor Company since 1961. Introduced as a replacement for the Ford F-Series panel van, the line has spanned four generations. Sold in both retail and commercial markets, the E-Series has been offered as passenger and cargo vans, as well as in cutaway and stripped-chassis configurations.

With over 8.2 million units sold since 1961, the Ford E-Series is the third-best selling van line in history (outranked only by the Ford Transit and Volkswagen Transporter). Ford retired the E-Series passenger and cargo vans after the 2014 model year, replacing them with the Ford Transit. The E-Series continues to be offered only in cutaway and stripped-chassis configurations.

The E-Series was assembled at Ohio Assembly in Avon Lake, Ohio, which produced the E-Series since 1975. Before its closure in 2005, Lorain Assembly in Lorain, Ohio, built the model line from its launch in 1961. In 2021, it became the second active Ford model line after the F-Series to reach 60 years of continuous production.

== First generation (1961–1967) ==
First generation
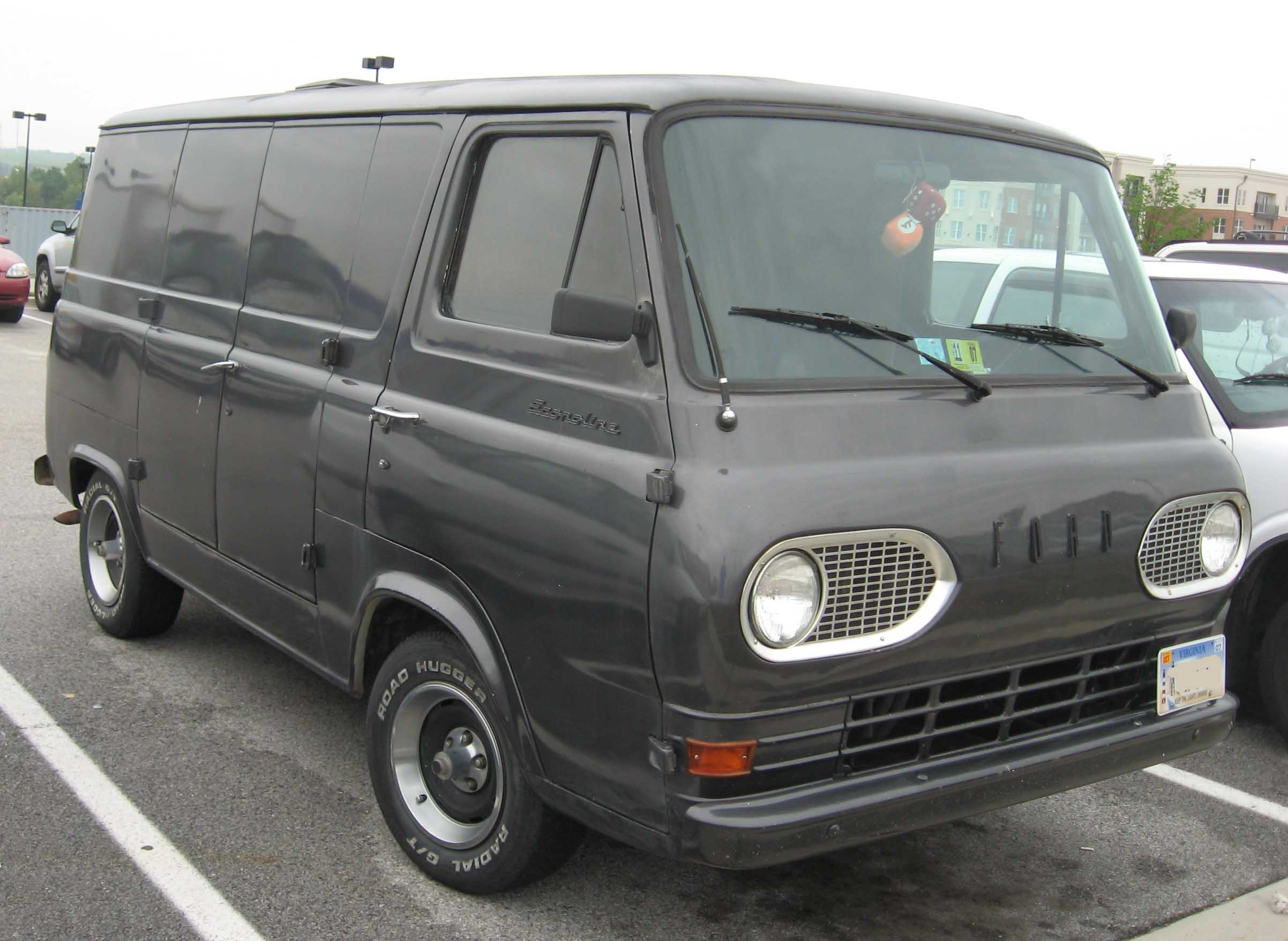
- 1961–1967 Ford Econoline (customized)

Overview
- Also called: Ford Falcon/Econoline Station Bus; Ford Falcon Club Wagon; Mercury Econoline (Canada)
- Production: 1960–1967

Body and chassis
- Body style: 4-door panel van 6-door van 8-door van 2-door pickup truck
- Layout: FMR layout
- Related: Ford Falcon; Ford Ranchero

Powertrain
- Engine: 144 cu in (2.4 L) Falcon Six I6; 170 cu in (2.8 L) Thriftpower Six I6; 240 cu in (3.9 L) Truck Six I6
- Transmission: 3-speed manual 4-speed manual 3-speed C4 automatic

Dimensions
- Wheelbase: 90.0 in (2,286.0 mm)
- Length: 168.3 in (4,274.8 mm); 186.3 in (4,732.0 mm) (Econoline Super Van)
- Width: 75.0 in (1,905.0 mm)
- Height: 76.9 in (1,953.3 mm)

Ford released the first-generation Ford Econoline for 1961 on September 21, 1960. Beginning development in 1957, the model line served as a single replacement for both Ford panel delivery (based on the F-100) and sedan delivery (the Ford Courier) model lines. The Econoline became a three-vehicle model family, including a cargo van, a passenger van (which would also wear the Station Bus and Club Wagon names), and a forward-control pickup truck.

Competing directly against the rear-engined Chevrolet Corvair van and the Volkswagen Transporter, Ford also designed the Econoline as a forward-control vehicle. In a major break from design precedents of the time, Ford instead used a mid-engine layout, placing the engine between the front seats. The change created a flat load floor (with the exception of the engine compartment) and allowed the rear doors to extend fully to the bumpers. Subsequently, the configuration was adopted by the 1964 Chevrolet G10 and Dodge A100.

=== Chassis ===
The first-generation Ford Econoline was based on the Ford Falcon compact car range. To accommodate its 90-inch wheelbase (the shortest for a Ford since 1908), the Econoline adopted a midengined configuration, placing the engine behind the front axle; consequently, the layout precluded the use of a V8 engine.

The Econoline was initially powered by the 85 hp (63 kW) 144-cubic-inch inline-six (the standard engine of the Falcon); a 101 hp (75 kW) 170-cubic-inch inline-six was introduced as an option. For 1965, the 170 six became standard, with a 240 cubic-inch six introduced as an option. A three-speed manual was standard, with a Dagenham four-speed manual introduced for 1963 and discontinued in 1964; the 170-cubic-inch engine was offered with a three-speed automatic in 1964, and the larger two engines were both offered with a three-speed automatic as an option thereafter.

In contrast to the Falcon, the Econoline was fitted with a solid front axle and a solid rear axle suspension with leaf springs for all four wheels.

=== Body ===
In its body design, the Ford Econoline adapted several elements of the Volkswagen Type 2, while making major departures with other design features to accommodate its mid-engined layout. In line with Volkswagen, the Econoline positioned the front seats above the front axle, making it a cabover-style configuration (similar to the Jeep Forward Control). The grille placed below the headlights was a design feature borrowed loosely from the Ford Thames 400E (a predecessor of the Ford Transit).

The midengined placement enlarged the cargo area, as the engine compartment was located forward of the flat load floor. While Volkswagen marketed rear-engined vans in the United States until 1991, Chevrolet/GMC and Dodge both adopted the design of the Econoline, introducing midengined vans for the 1964 model year.

Through its production, the first-generation Ford Econoline was offered in several variants. Alongside the standard six-door cargo van, an eight-door version (adding two doors on the driver side) was added for 1963. For 1964, a panel van was introduced, deleting side loading doors altogether. For 1965, a "Super Van" extended-length body was introduced, extending the body 18 inches behind the rear axle. Econoline cargo vans (except panel vans) were offered with or without side windows in several configurations.

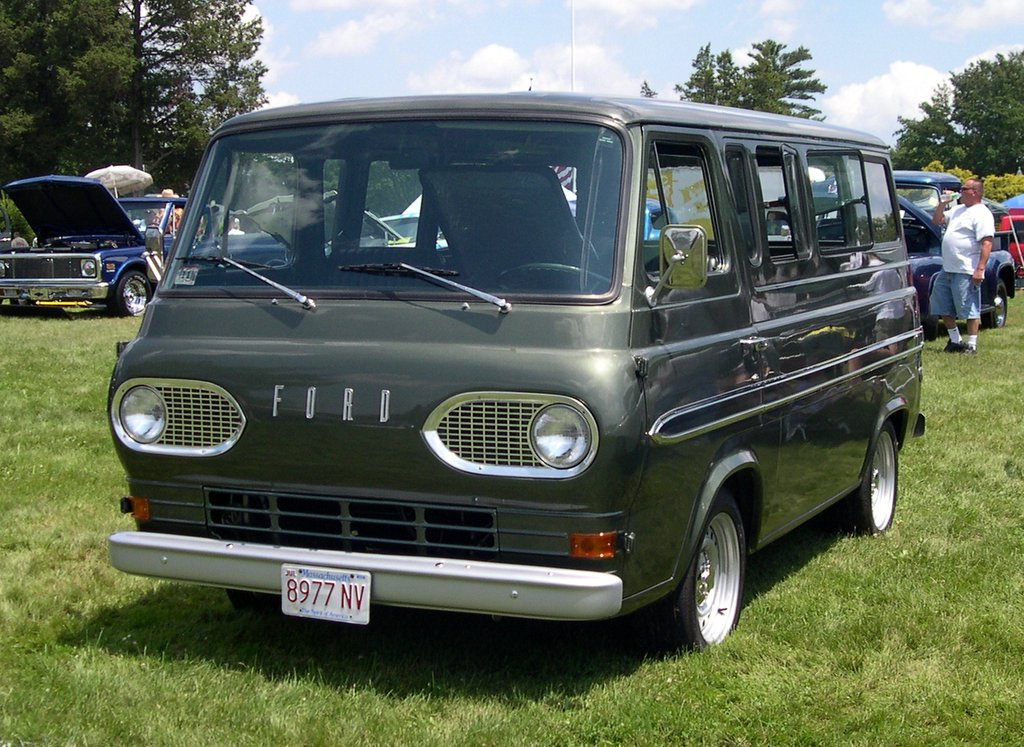
1963 Ford Falcon Club Wagon

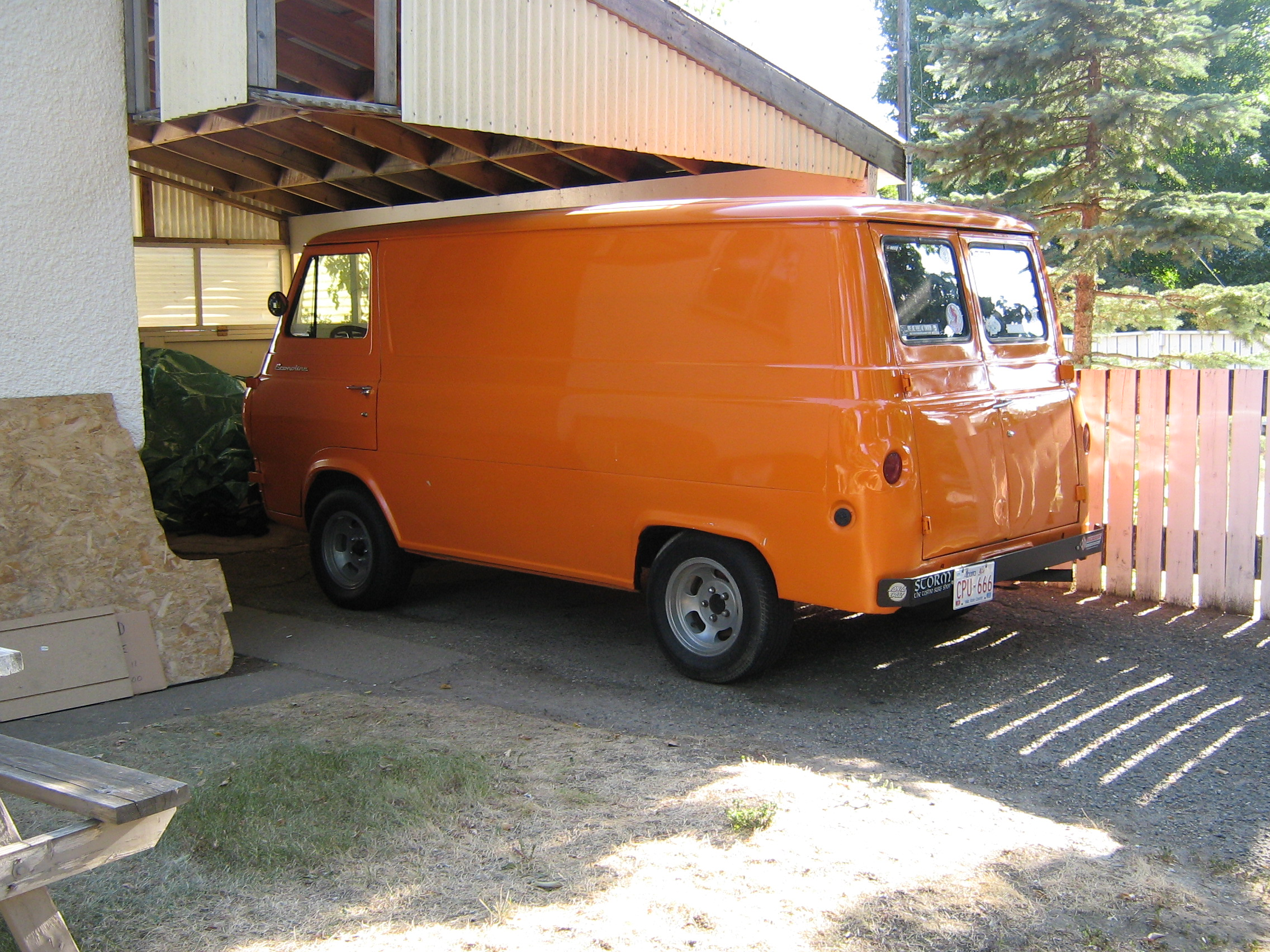
1961-1967 Ford Econoline cargo van (aftermarket wheels)

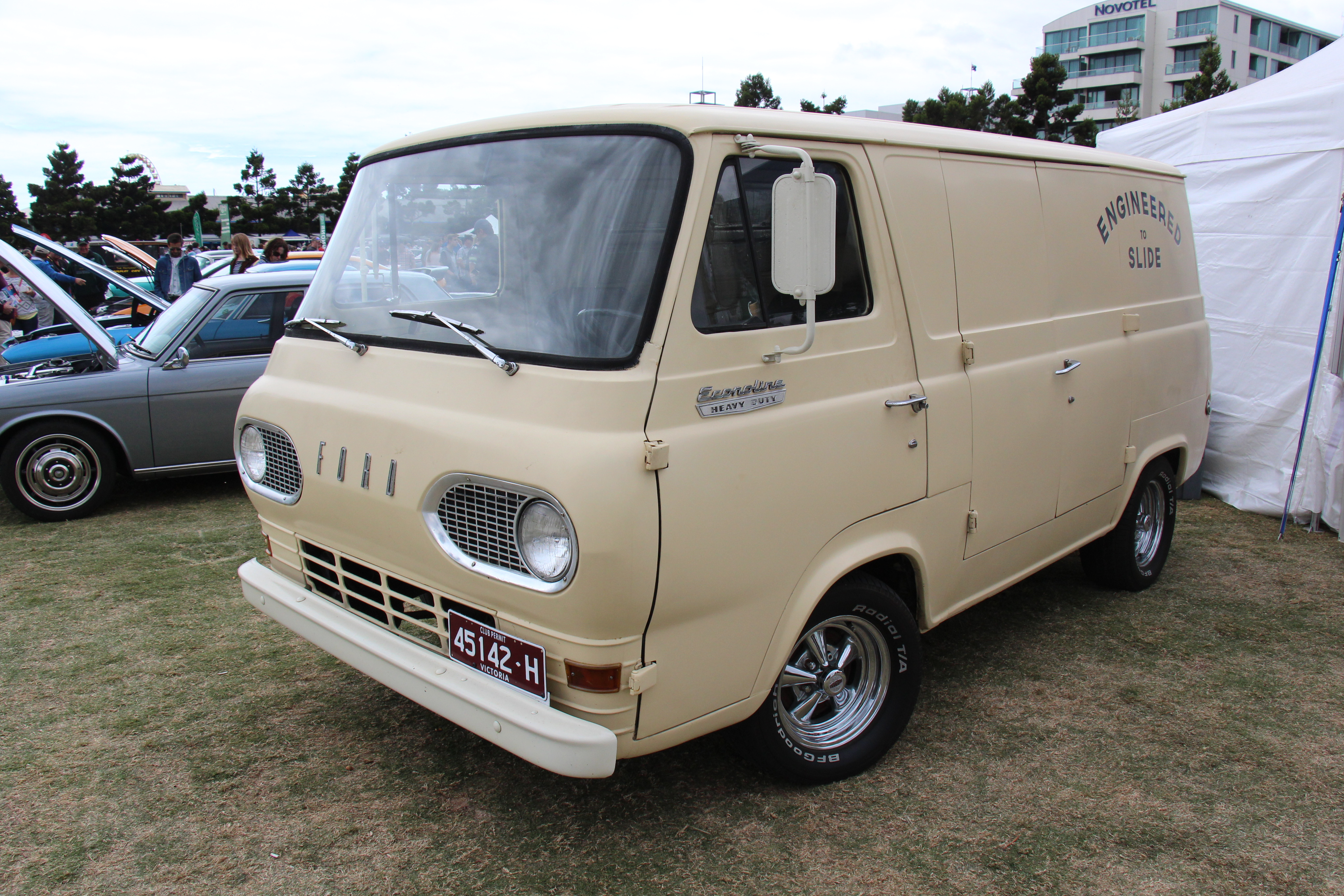
1964 Ford Econoline Heavy Duty cargo van (8-door version)

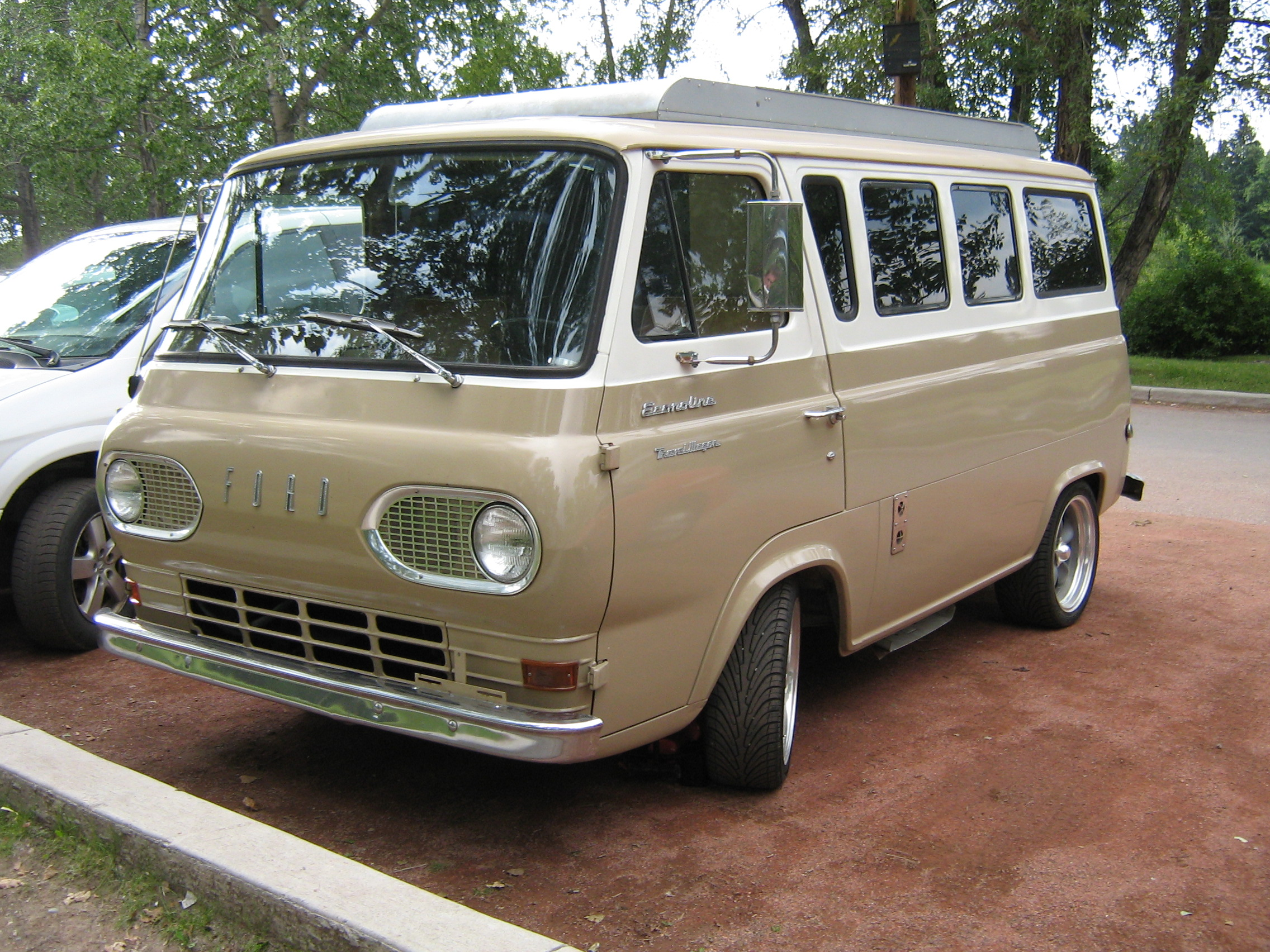
Ford Econoline TravelWagon (camper interior)

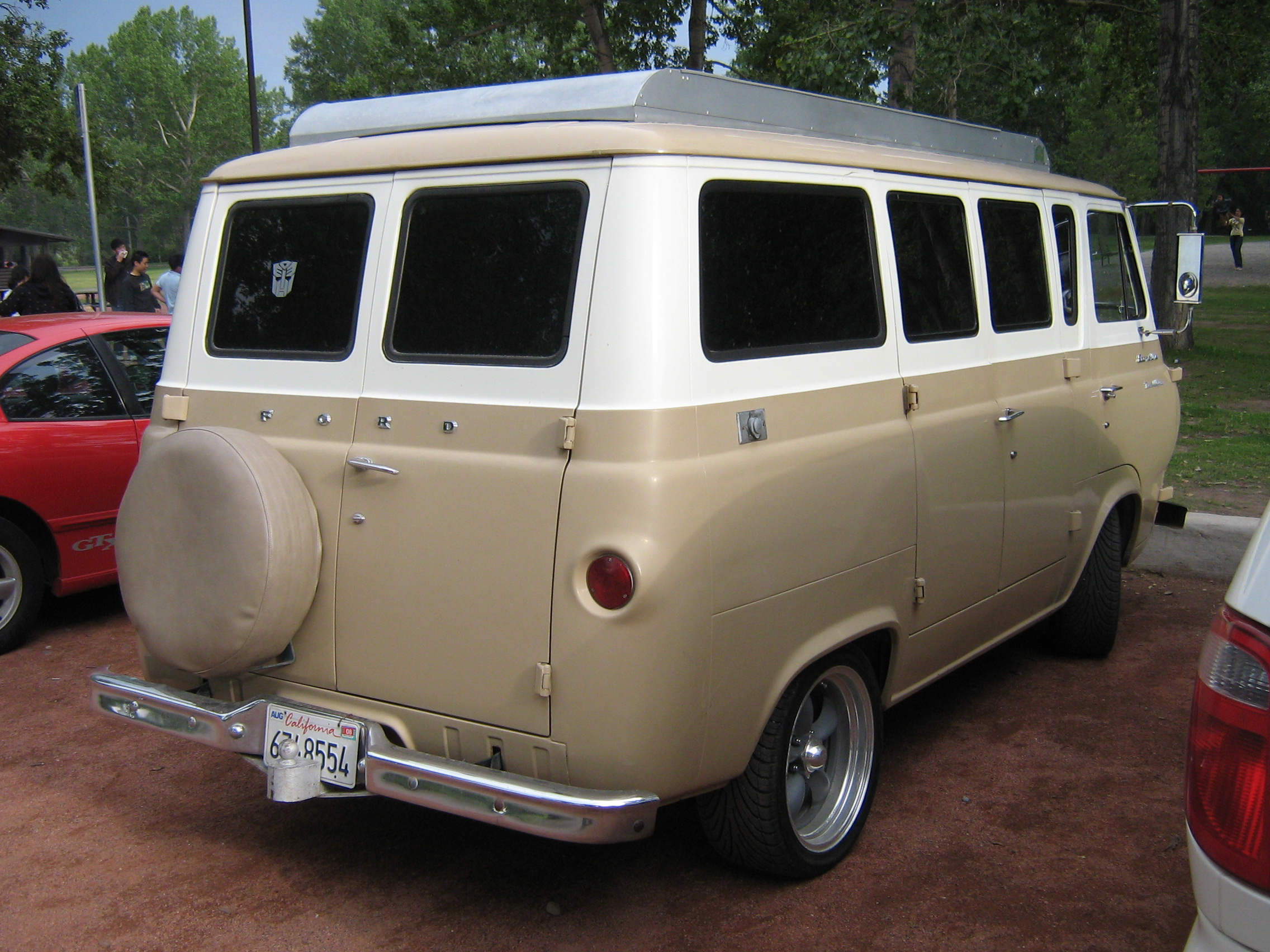
Ford Econoline TravelWagon (camper interior)

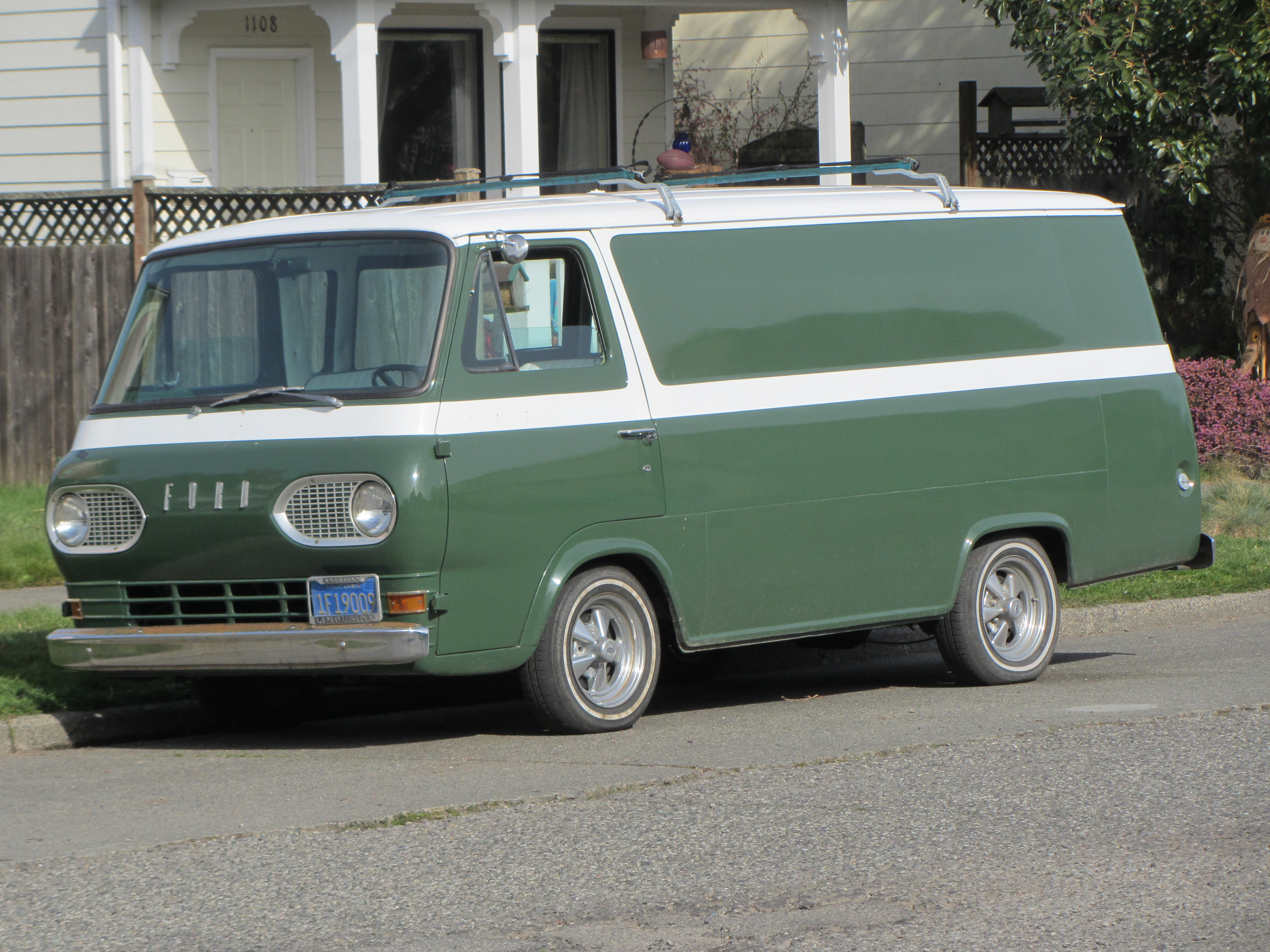
1965–1967 Ford Econoline Super Van (extended-length); aftermarket wheels

=== Variants ===
Alongside the Ford Falcon, the Ford Econoline was expanded into a product line including several vehicles. In Canada, the Econoline was marketed through both the sales networks of both Ford and Lincoln-Mercury (as a Mercury), to increase its presence outside of urban areas.

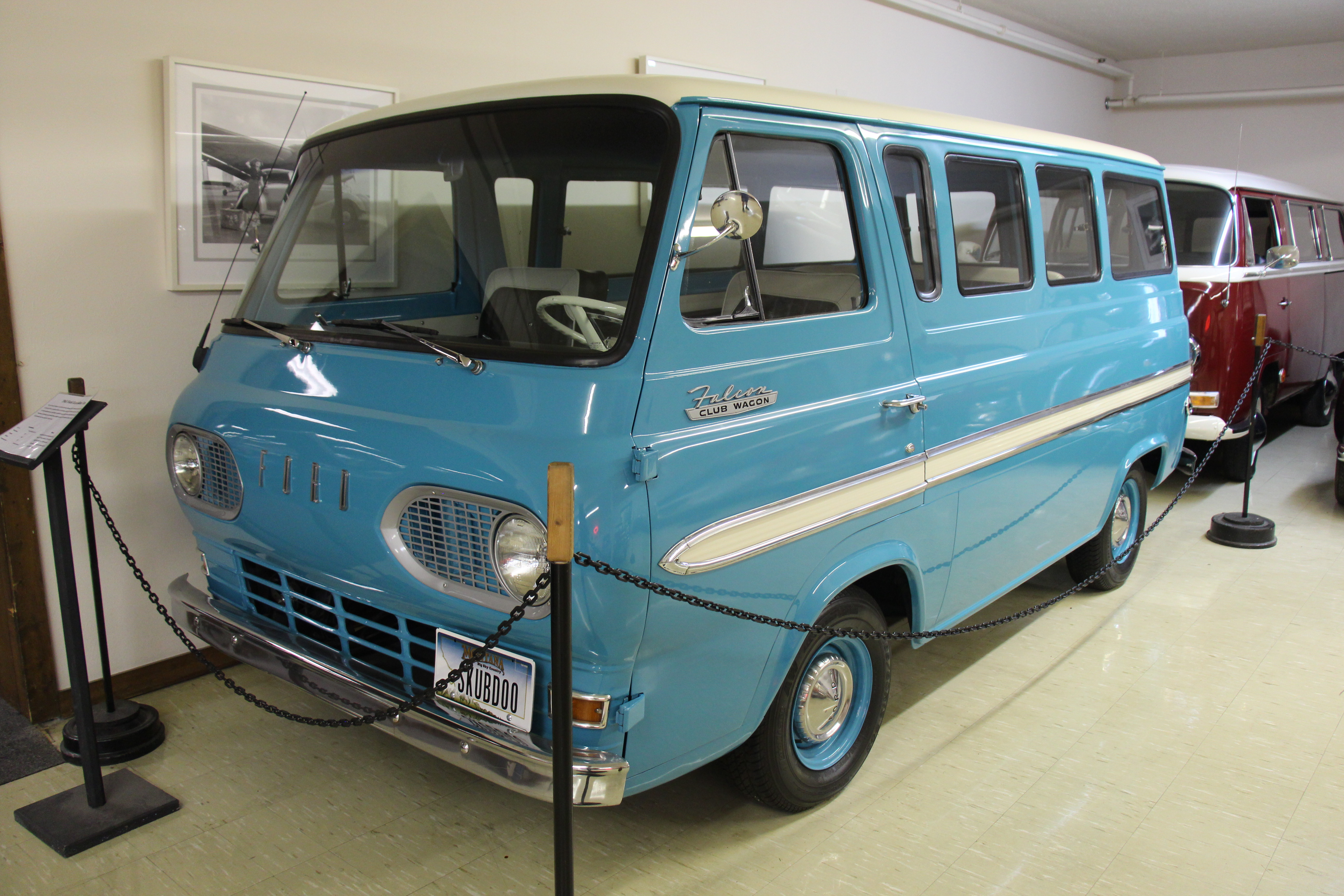
1963 Ford Falcon Club Wagon (passenger van)

==== Passenger van ====
Introduced alongside the cargo van in 1961, Ford introduced two passenger variants of the Econoline (branded as part of the Falcon range). Alongside the Station Bus (branded as both a Falcon and Econoline), Ford marketed the Club Wagon. While the Station Bus was largely intended for commercial/fleet use, the Club Wagon was marketed as an alternative to station wagons. A five-seat configuration was standard, with an eight-seat configuration offered as an option.

==== Pickup truck ====
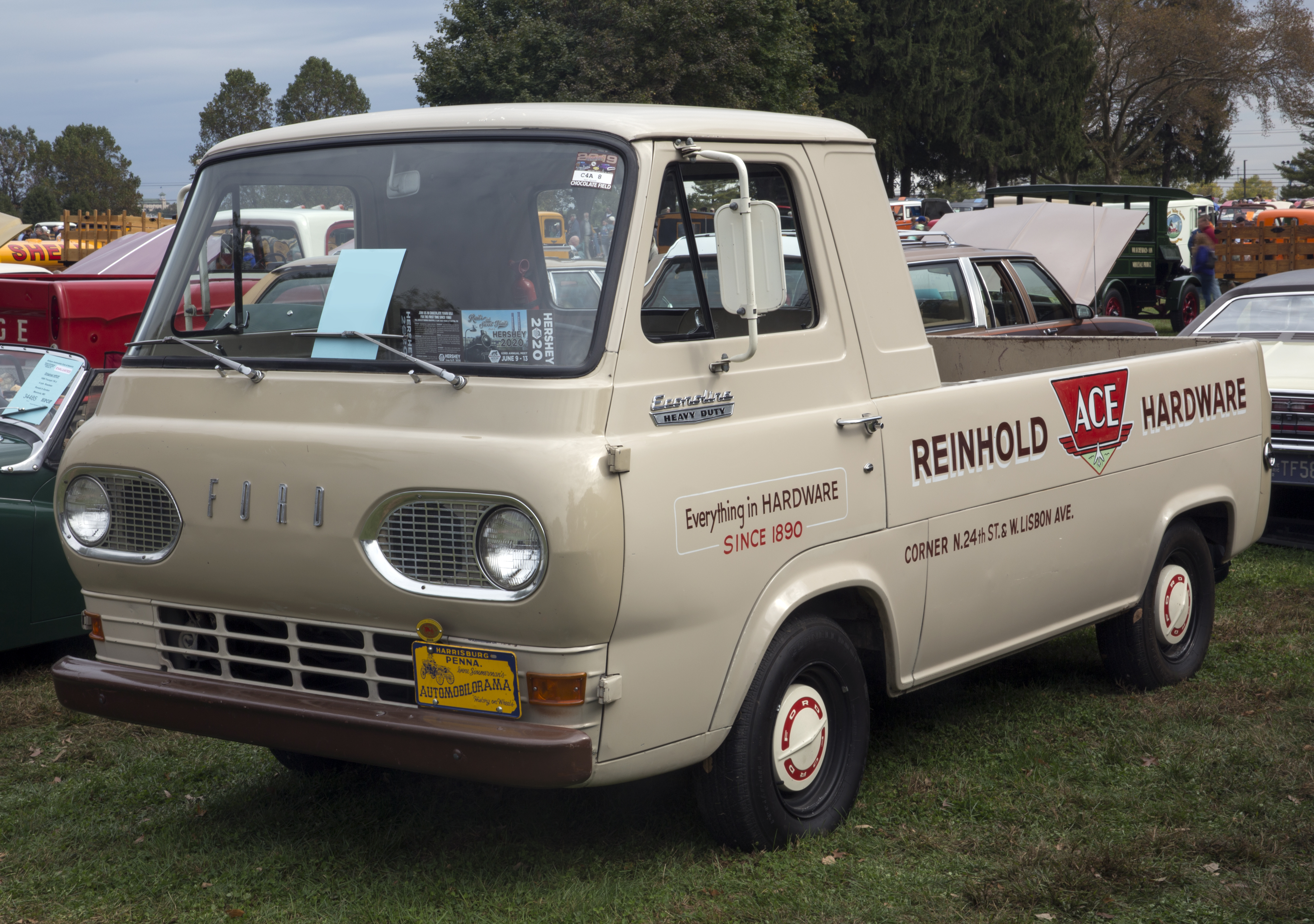
1967 Ford Econoline Heavy Duty pickup truck

Introduced as a bodystyle for 1961, the Ford Econoline pickup truck derived its body from the cargo van. Similar in configuration to the Chevrolet Corvair pickup, the Econoline pickup bed had no engine intrusion related to the engine compartment. While far shorter than the similar-GVWR F-100, the Econoline pickup was designed with a 7-foot-long pickup bed (sized between the two F-Series offerings). Two versions of the cab were offered, a standard "three-window" cab and an optional "five-window," which added wraparound windows to the cab corners.

The introduction of the 240-cubic-inch engine for 1965 necessitated a larger engine compartment, intruding slightly into the cargo bed (to provide clearance for the transmission bellhousing). The same year, a "Spring Special" package was offered as a trim option.

At the time of its launch, Ford projected the Econoline pickup truck to outsell the van, but buyers reversed the trend, with the van outselling the pickup truck nine-to-one. The bodystyle ended production after the 1967 model year, remaining unique to the first generation.

==== Mercury Econoline ====
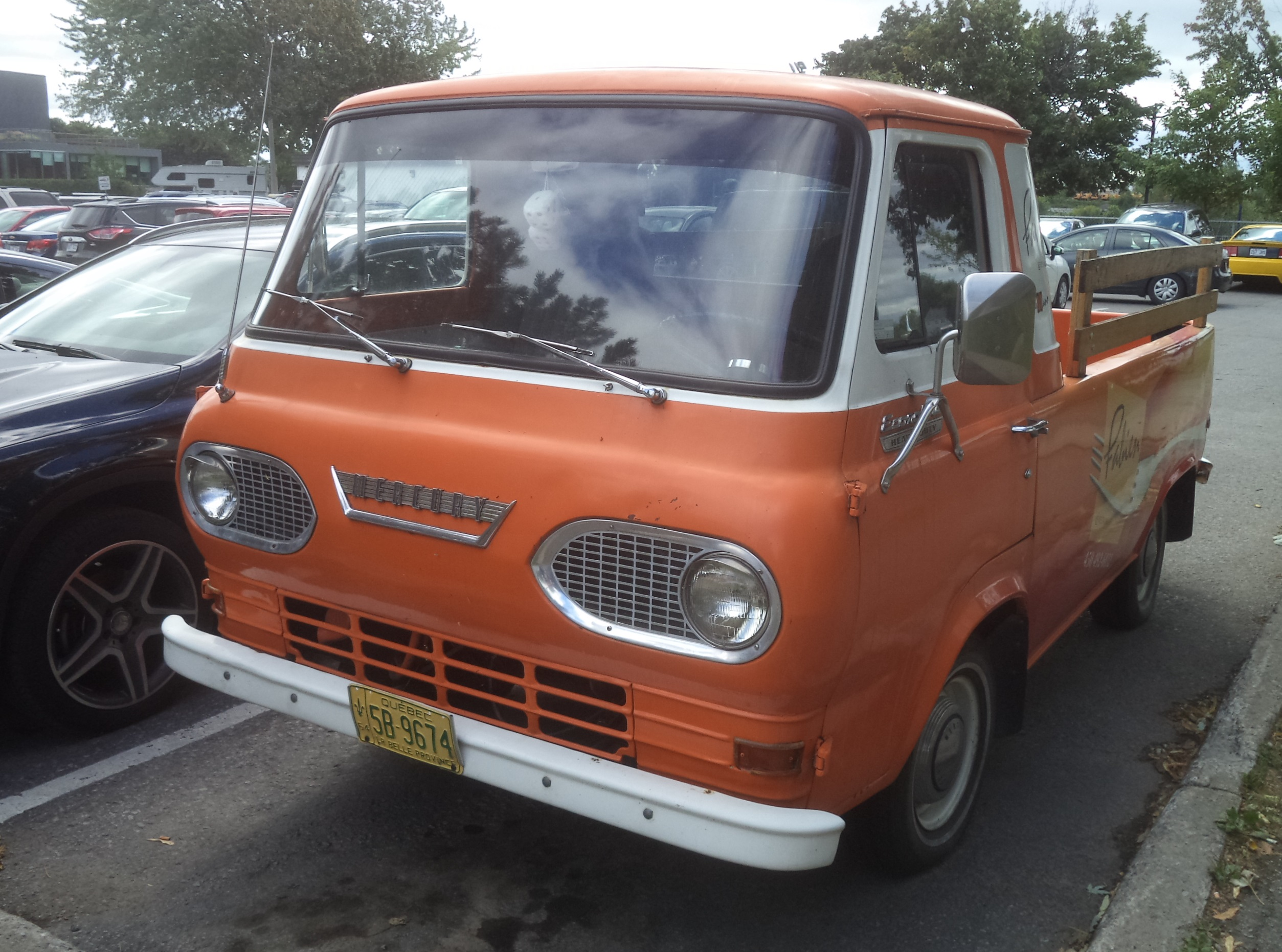
1964 Mercury Econoline pickup truck

The first-generation Econoline was sold by Ford of Canada by both Ford and Lincoln-Mercury. When branding its truck offerings under the Mercury brand, Ford of Canada maximized its presence in rural area serviced by either Ford or Lincoln-Mercury (but not both). As with the Mercury M-series trucks, the Mercury Econoline was largely identical to its Ford namesake (differing primarily in badging); the model was marketed in Canada as a cargo and passenger van and a pickup truck.

For 1961, Ford of Canada began production Mercury-brand Econolines at Oakville Assembly in Ontario; later that year, Mercury Econoline pickup was shifted to Lorain Assembly in Ohio. For 1962, production of the entire model line returned to Oakville. After 1965, production of the model line was sourced from the United States.

Production numbers of Mercury Econolines were low, with only 1,291 Mercury Econoline pickup trucks being built in 1965. Following the 1968 model year, Ford of Canada ended the sale of Mercury-branded trucks, leaving the Mercury Econoline as the last Mercury-branded van until the 1993 Mercury Villager minivan.

== Second generation (1968–1974) ==
Second generation
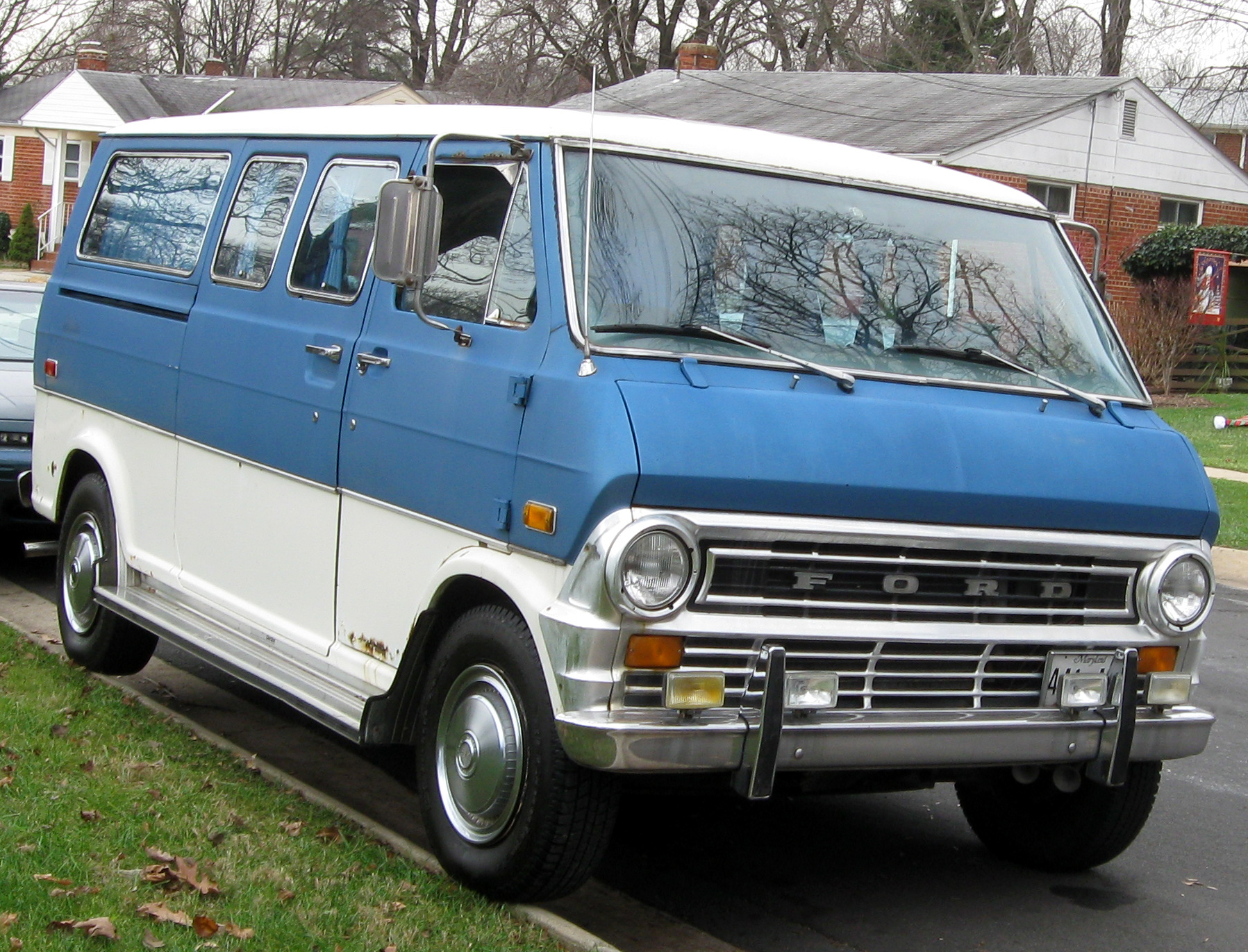
- 1972–1974 Ford Club Wagon

Overview
- Production: 1968–1974

Body and chassis
- Body style: 3-door van
- Layout: FR layout

Powertrain
- Engine: 240 cu in (3.9 L) I6; 300 cu in (4.9 L) I6; 302 cu in (4.9 L) small block V8
- Transmission: 3-Speed Manual; 3-speed Cruise-O-Matic automatic

Dimensions
- Wheelbase: SWB: 105.5 in (2,679.7 mm); LWB: 123.5 in (3,136.9 mm)

Following a lengthy United Auto Workers strike in 1967, the launch of the second-generation Econoline van was delayed almost four months, until January 1968. Instead of marketing the van as a 1968 or 1968-1/2 model, Ford marketed it for model year 1969. Losing its Falcon roots, the second-generation Econoline became a heavier-duty vehicle, sharing many of its underpinnings with the F-Series full-sized pickups.

=== Chassis ===
The unibody construction of the previous generation was carried over, and the mid-engine, forward-control layout gave way to a front-engine layout with a forward axle placement; this allowed use of the "Twin-I-Beam" front suspension from the F-Series trucks. The wheelbase increased 15 in (381.0 mm), while the 18 in (457.2 mm) longer long-wheelbase model became the largest full-sized van offered in North America at the time.

Following Dodge and Chevrolet/GMC, a V8 engine became optional.

=== Body ===
With the change of chassis and axle configurations, the Econoline gained a conventional hood for engine access, though engine access remained largely from the van's interior. The redesign provided a conventional grille, styled similarly to the F-Series.

For 1971, the grille was redesigned to match the updated F-Series. For 1972, a sliding rear door became an option; introduced on a cutaway van chassis was the Hi-Cube van, a cab-chassis version of the Econoline with a box-van body. The introduction of the cab-chassis variant became popular in the recreational-vehicle industry (a Class C RV), a segment still dominated by the E-Series in the 2010s.

=== Interior ===
Inside of the Econoline, the shift of the engine location moved the engine housing from between the seats to in front of the driver and front passenger, under the windshield. While the Econoline cargo van remained, it was joined by an Econoline passenger van (replacing the Falcon van). To attract more buyers to passenger vans, Ford introduced three new trims of the passenger van, the Ford Club Wagon, Ford Club Wagon Deluxe, and Ford Club Wagon Chateau. Based on the long-wheelbase version, the Chateau had air conditioning as standard (normally an option), houndstooth fabric on all seats, an AM/FM sound system, and the option of 12-passenger seating.

Second-generation models 1969–1974

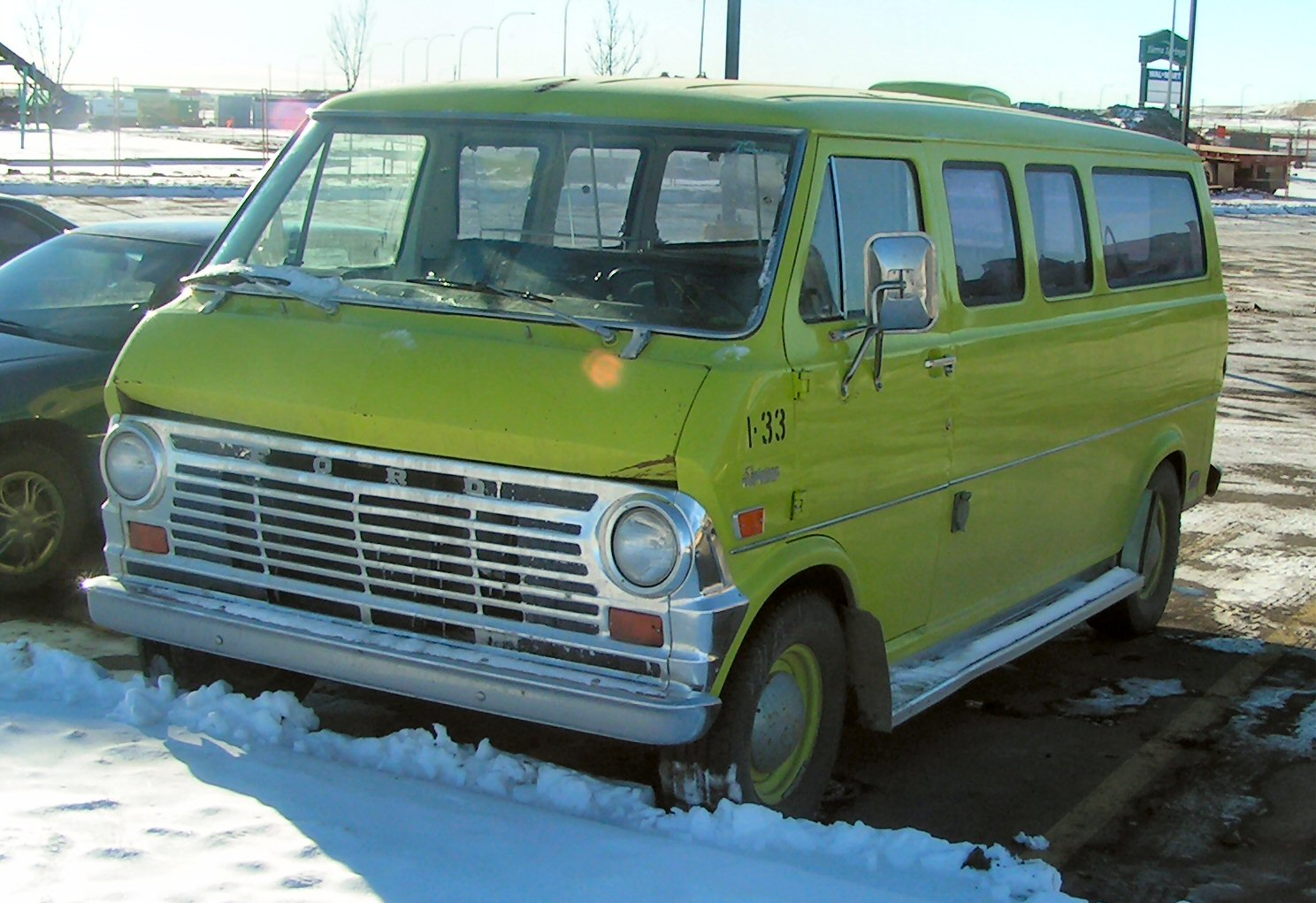
1969–71 Econoline Window Van

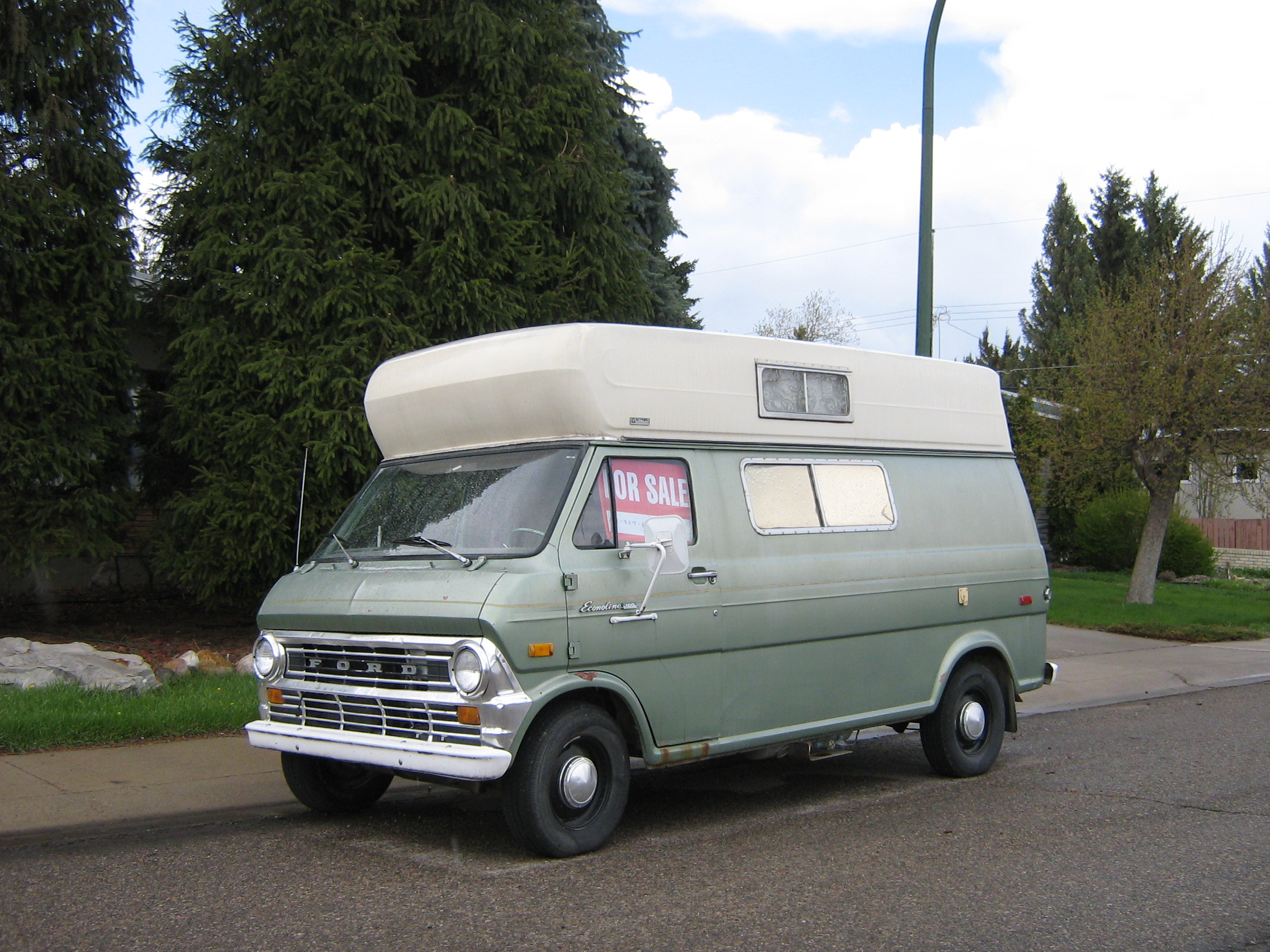
1972 Econoline motorhome conversion

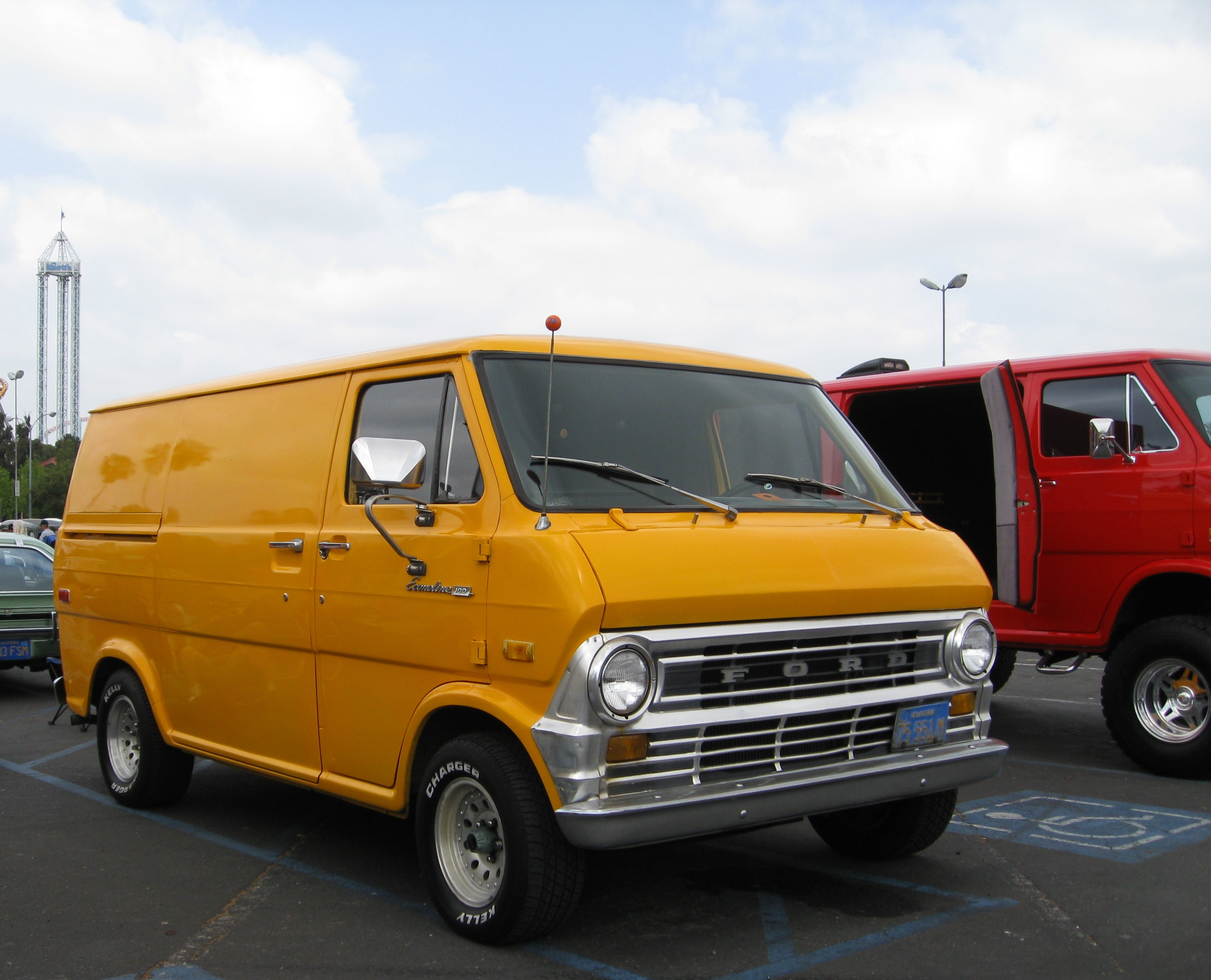
1973 Econoline 100

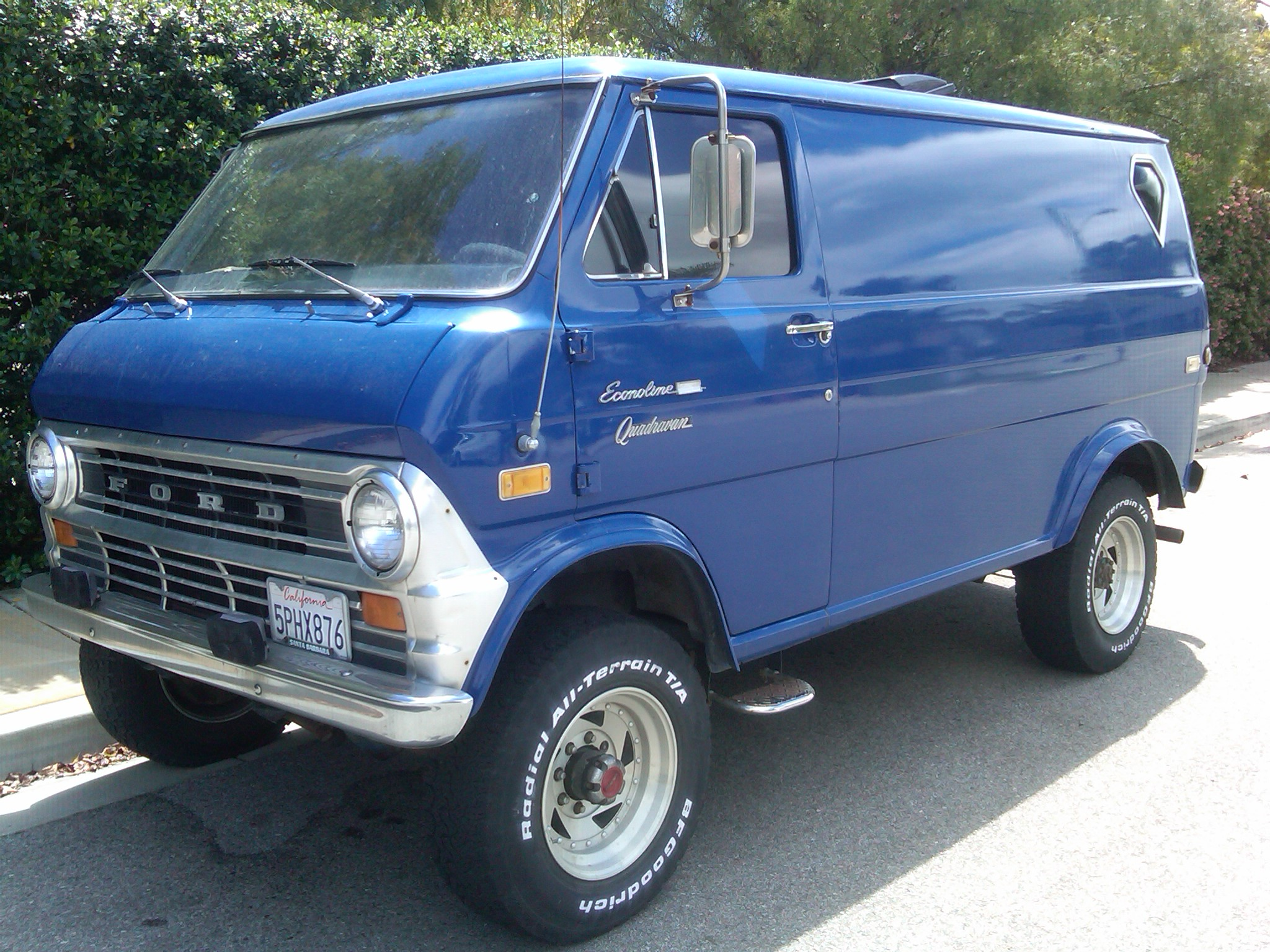
1974 Ford Econoline E-300 Quadravan

== Third generation (1975–1991) ==
Third generation
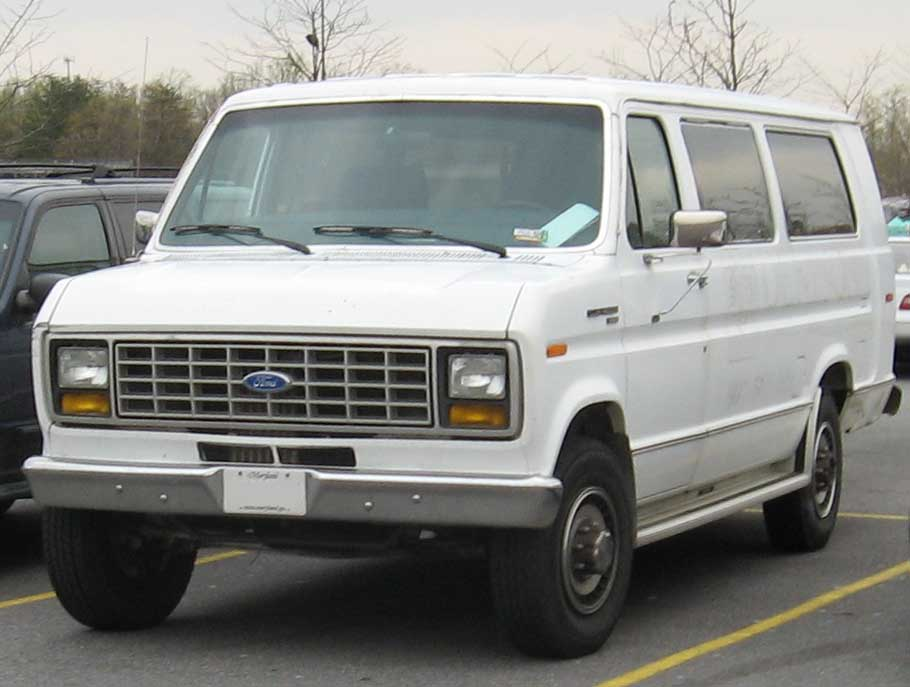
- 1983–1991 Club Wagon

Overview
- Also called: Ford Club Wagon
- Production: 1975–1991

Body and chassis
- Body style: 3-door van
- Layout: FR layout
- Platform: Ford VN platform
- Related: Ford Carousel

Powertrain
- Engine: 300 cu in (4.9 L) I6; 302 cu in (4.9 L) small block V8; 351 cu in (5.8 L) small block V8; 400 cu in (6.6 L) Cleveland V8; 460 cu in (7.5 L) 385 V8; 6.9 L International IDI diesel V8; 7.3 L International IDI diesel V8
- Transmission: 3-speed manual 4-speed manual 3-speed automatic 4-speed automatic 5-speed manual

Dimensions
- Wheelbase: SWB: 124 in (3,150 mm) (until 1990); LWB: 138 in (3,505 mm)

For 1975, the Econoline/Club Wagon were given a complete redesign. Based on an all-new chassis, Ford became the first American manufacturer to adapt body-on-frame construction to a full-size van.

The new-generation Econoline would become common not only in its own right, but as the basis for other vehicles. With a full frame, the Econoline became popular as a cutaway van chassis; the design served as a basis for many ambulances, and various types of trucks and buses. The shared drivetrain with the F-Series marked the beginning of aftermarket four-wheel drive conversions. During the 1970s, the Econoline became popular as a basis for van conversions. Using the sparsely-equipped Econoline cargo van as a basis, a luxurious interior was fitted, along with extensive customization of the exterior.

The 1978 Ford Econoline was Motor Trend's first-ever Truck of the Year.

=== Chassis ===
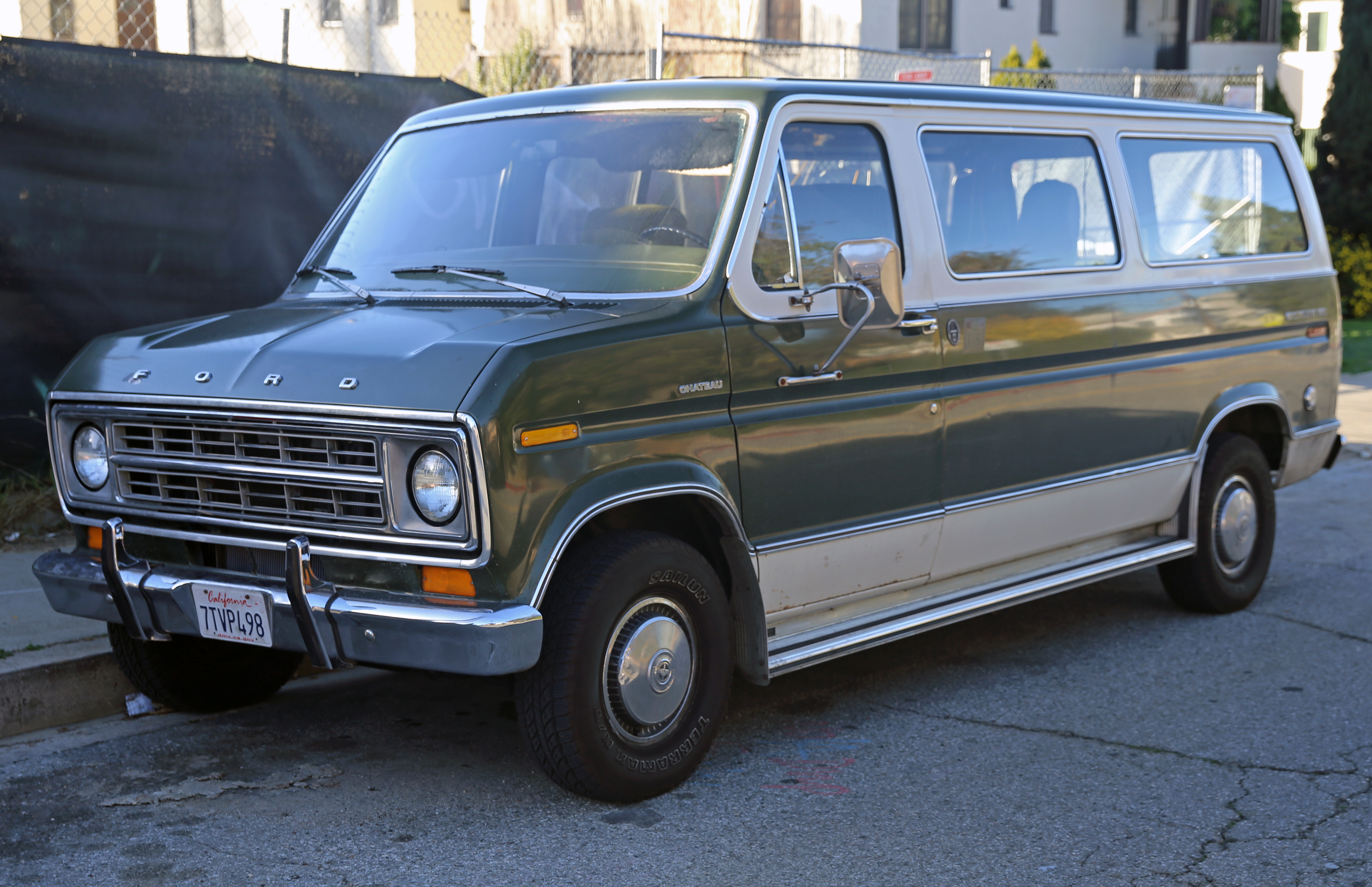
1975–1978 Ford E-150 Chateau Club Wagon

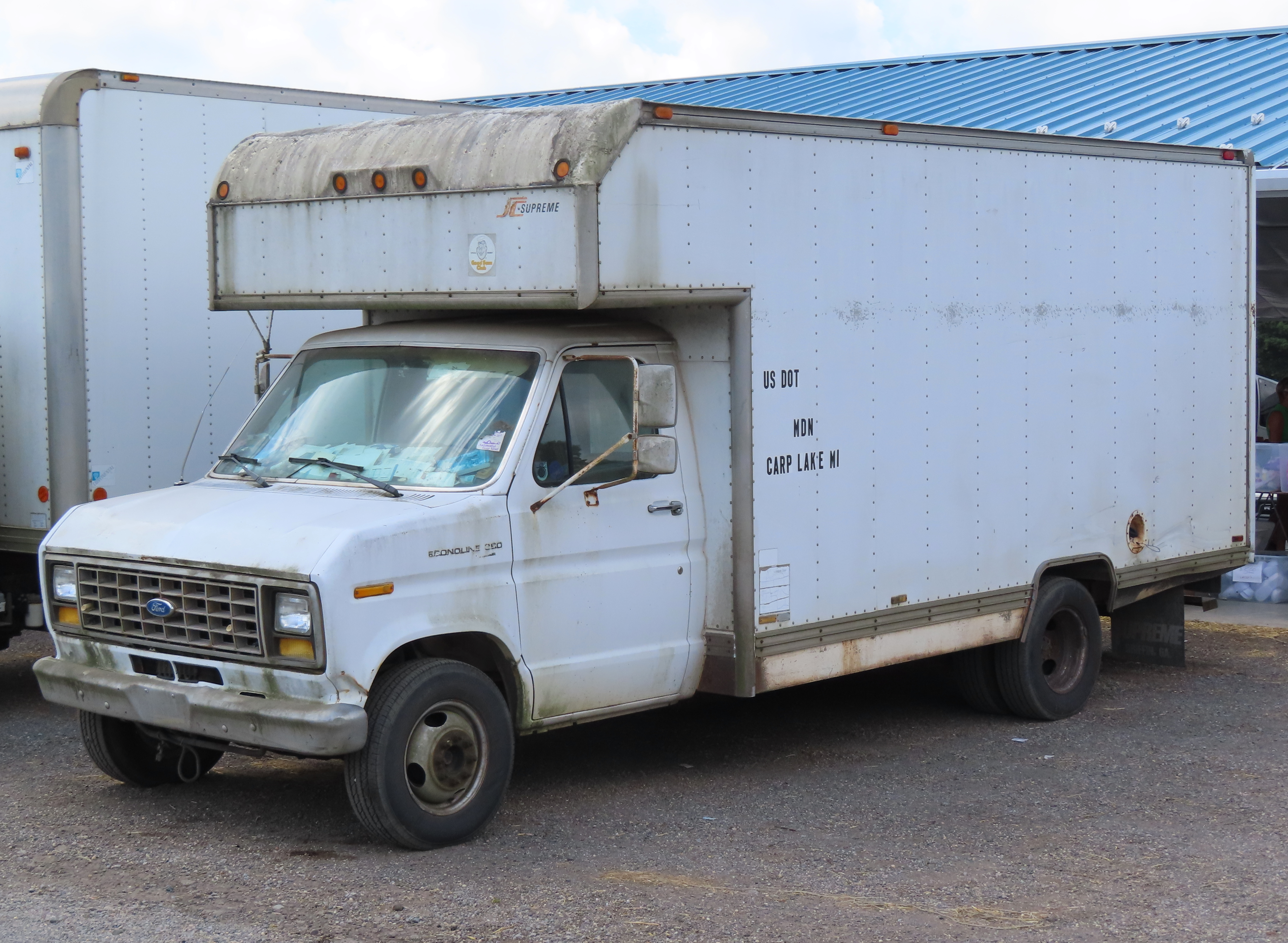
1989 Econoline E-350 cutaway van

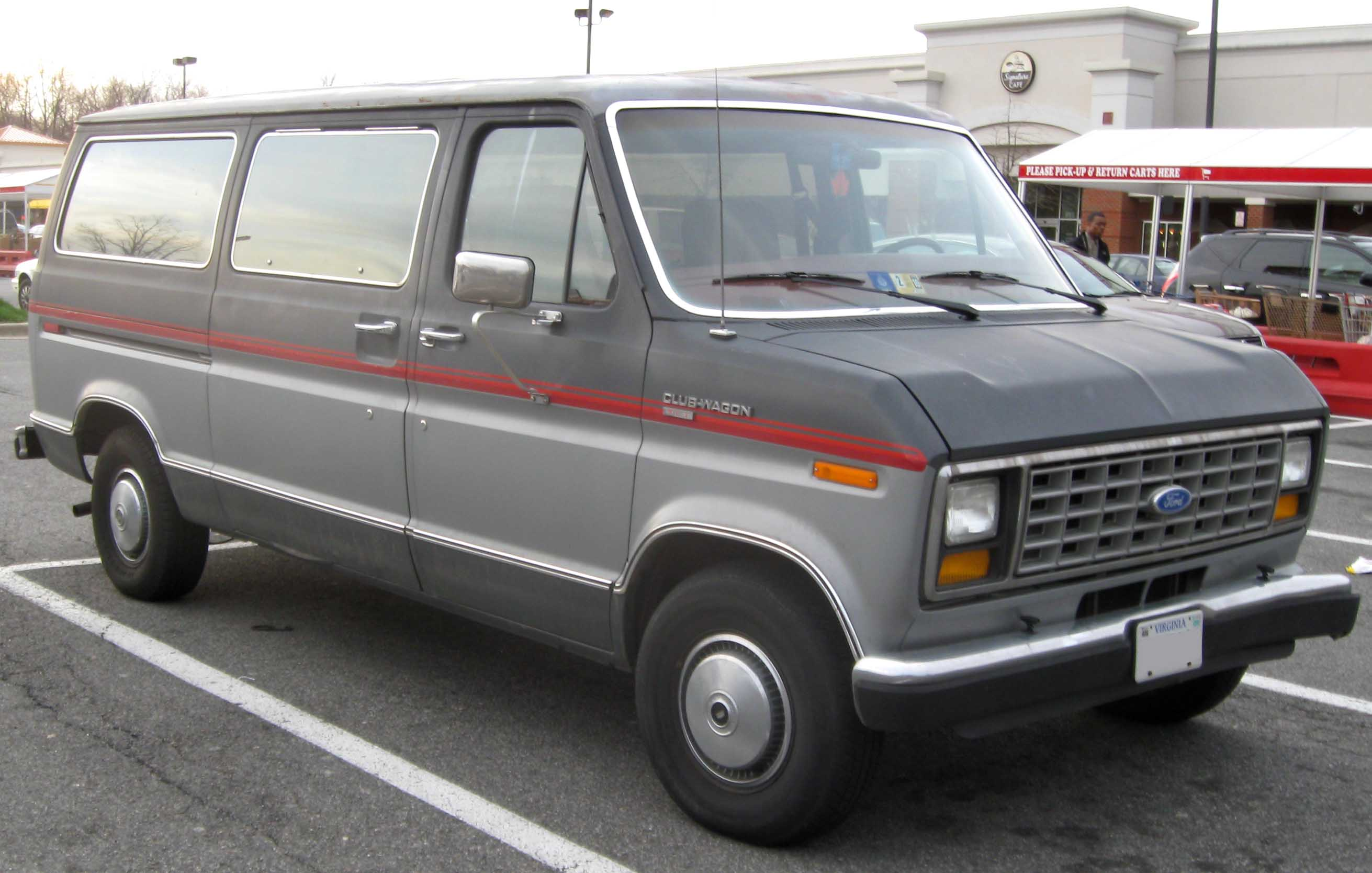
1980s Ford Club Wagon XLT

To increase the versatility of the full-size van line, the Econoline was developed using body-on-frame construction for the first time. In addition to increasing the strength of the chassis, the configuration allowed more commonality with the F-Series trucks. As before, the Twin-I-Beam front suspension was used. In its new configuration, the engine was moved further forward and lowered relative to the body. The van grew in size: the 124 inches (3,150 mm) short-wheelbase configuration was a half inch longer than the previous long-wheelbase chassis; the new long-wheelbase chassis was 138 inches (3,510 mm), the longest wheelbase full-size van sold until 1990. After the 1984 model year, the 124-inch wheelbase Club Wagon passenger van was discontinued, and the 124-inch wheelbase Econoline Cargo Van was discontinued after the 1990 model year, leaving the 138-inch wheelbase as the sole option.

In 1983, to increase the fuel economy of the Econoline without a major loss in engine output, Ford introduced the option of a 6.9L IDI diesel V8 produced by International Harvester; in 1988, this was enlarged to 7.3L. The diesel V8 engines were available only in Econoline 350s (or Club Wagons sold on the same chassis). The cutaway version was available with the 4.9L 6-cylinder or the larger (5.8L and up) V8s.

Due to the popularity of automatic transmissions in full-size vans, Ford discontinued all manual transmissions after the 1989 model year. The column-shifted 3-speed departed after 1986, leaving the floor-shifted 4-speed overdrive manual as standard. The four-speed was replaced by a Mazda-sourced 5-speed M5OD for 1988.

=== Body ===
Unlike its predecessors, Ford designed the 1975 Econoline with a "two-box" layout. Similar to the Ford Transit of the time, the configuration moved the engine as far forward as possible and lower in the chassis than in its predecessor; although the hood was nearly twice as long, the hoodline was much lower. A higher degree of parts commonality with the F-Series made itself known in the body styling: the vent windows, taillights, bumpers, and wheels were common items between the two vehicles.

During its sixteen-year production run, the exterior of the Econoline/Club Wagon would remain nearly unaltered. In 1978, the Super Van/Super Wagon was introduced; based on the 138-inch wheelbase, it was a rear body extension allowing for extra cargo room or an extra row of seating (for up to 15 passengers). In 1979, a minor facelift updated the grille design; round headlights were replaced by rectangular units. In 1983, the Ford Blue Oval was added to the grille, replacing the "FORD" lettering on the hood. Specific to the 1984 model year was a standard grille finish of dark argent with bright surround for both the Econoline and Club Wagon; chrome remained an option and was included with the latter's XLT trim. The grille was afterwards reverted to bright argent. Also for '84 did the Econoline's payload grade (150/250/350) become incorporated into the fender lettering until all fender badging was eliminated for the 1991 model year. Club Wagon chassis variants were not denoted.

Although the 1986 Ford Aerostar minivan would introduce styling far different from the Econoline, the basic styling of the full-size van would heavily influence the Ford Ranger (and its SUV offspring, the Ford Bronco II).

=== Interior ===
Inside, the redesign of the chassis expanded interior room, though the rear of the engine still remained between the front seats; an engine cover still provided access for servicing. Sharing many controls with the F-Series, the new design also improved interior ergonomics. In three body sizes, the Econoline was produced in a cargo van and passenger van, with the latter produced in three trim levels: base, Custom and Chateau. In addition, the Club Wagon was produced solely as a passenger van. After 1980, this was replaced by the F-Series nomenclature of XL and XLT. In line with the F-Series, the Econoline/Club Wagon was sold in 100/150/250/350 variants, with the Econoline 100 discontinued after the 1983 model year.

1975–1991 Ford Econoline dimensions
	124" WB	138" WB (Standard Van)	138" WB (Super Van)
Length	186.8 in (4,745 mm)	206.8 in (5,253 mm)	226.8 in (5,761 mm)
Wheelbase	124 in (3,149.6 mm)	138 in (3,505.2 mm)	
Height	79.1–79.9 in (2,009.1–2,029.5 mm)	79.2–84.4 in (2,011.7–2,143.8 mm)	80.9–84.8 in (2,054.9–2,153.9 mm)
Width	79.9 in (2,029 mm)		

== Fourth generation (1992–present) ==
Fourth generation
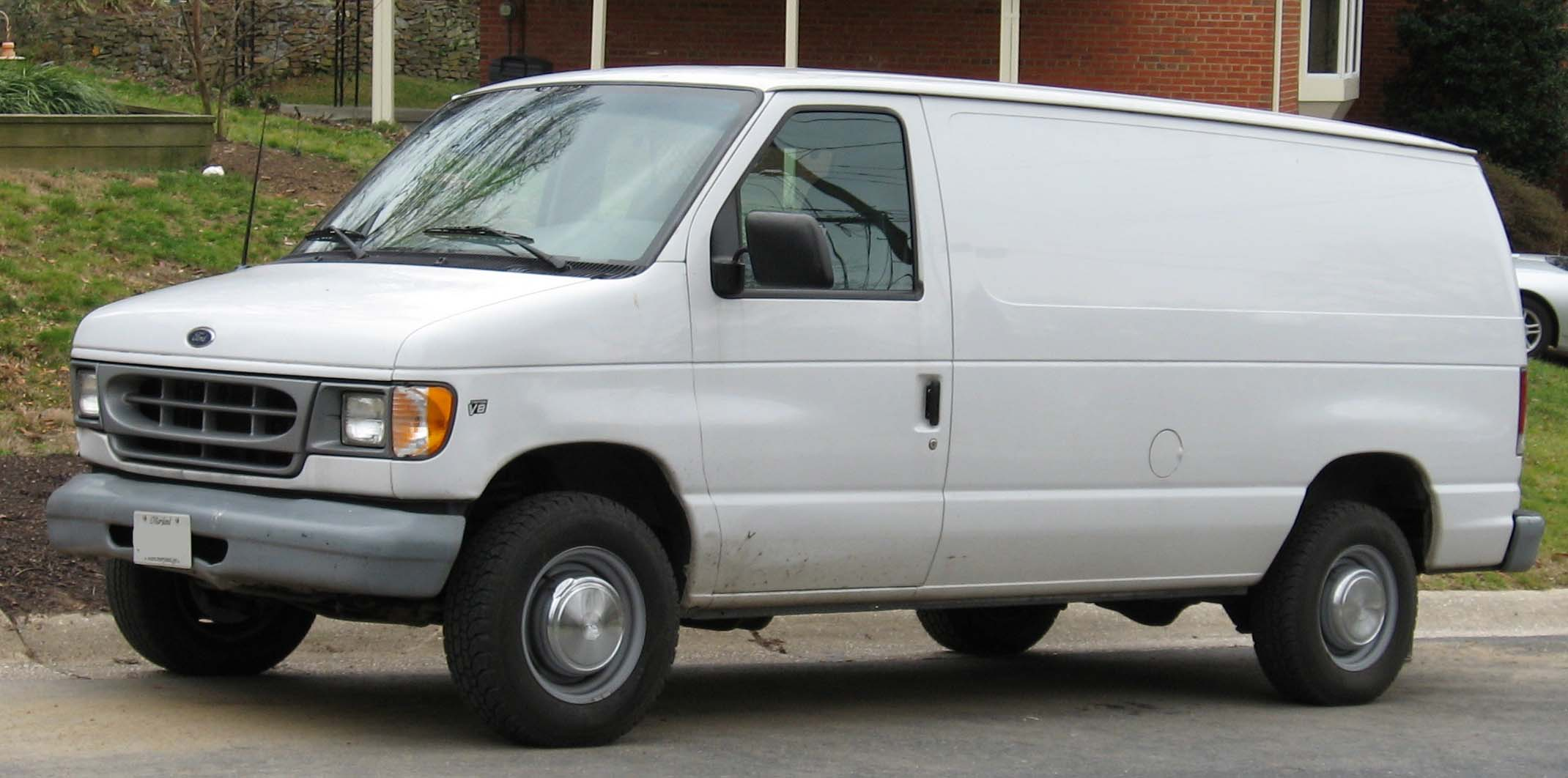
- 1997–2002 Ford Econoline

Overview
- Also called: Ford Econoline; Ford Club Wagon; Ford Econoline Wagon
- Production: 1991–2014 (passenger/cargo van); 1991–present (cutaway/stripped chassis)
- Model years: 1992–2014 (passenger/cargo van); 1992–present (cutaway/stripped chassis)

Body and chassis
- Body style: 3/4-door van 2-door cutaway/chassis-cab
- Layout: FR layout
- Platform: Ford VN platform

Powertrain
- Engine: Gasoline: 4.2 L (256 cu in) Essex V6; 4.6 L (281 cu in) Triton V8; 4.9 L (300 cu in) Truck Six I6; 4.9 L (302 cu in) small-block V8; 5.4 L (330 cu in) Triton V8; 5.8 L (351 cu in) Windsor V8; 7.3 L (445 cu in) Godzilla V8; 7.5 L (460 cu in) 385/Lima V8; Gasoline flex-fuel: 6.2 L (379 cu in) Boss V8; 6.8 L (415 cu in) Triton V10; Diesel: 6.0 L (366 cu in) Power Stroke V8; 7.3 L (444 cu in) IDI V8; 7.3 L (444 cu in) Power Stroke V8
- Transmission: 4-speed AOD automatic; 5-speed 5R110W automatic; 6-speed TorqShift automatic

Dimensions
- Wheelbase: 138 in (3,505 mm)
- Length: 1992–2007; Regular: 212 in (5,385 mm); Extended: 232 in (5,893 mm); 2008–2014; Regular: 216.7 in (5,504 mm); Extended: 236.7 in (6,012 mm)
- Width: 79.3–79.9 in (2,014–2,029 mm)
- Height: 80.7–84.1 in (2,050–2,136 mm)

Chronology
- Successor: Ford Transit

For the 1992 model year, Ford introduced the fourth generation of the Econoline/Club Wagon. While the third-generation chassis was largely carried over, the body and interior were completely redesigned — receiving several subsequent mid-cycle refreshes, the last in 2026.

Toward the end of the 1990s, Ford began to phase out the use of the Econoline and Club Wagon nameplates. For 1999, the Club Wagon nameplate was discontinued and the Econoline was renamed the E-Series, a nomenclature closer to that of Ford's full-size F-Series trucks.

In June 2014, E-Series passenger and cargo van production was discontinued as sales of the Ford Transit began in North America At the time of its retirement, the model line had been the best-selling full-size van line in the United States since 1980.

From the 2015 model year on, the E-Series remained in production solely in cutaway and stripped chassis configurations.

=== Chassis specifications ===
The fourth-generation shared the VN platform of the third-generation Econoline, introduced in 1975. Sharing many components with F-Series trucks, the E-Series retained the "Twin-I-Beam" front suspension used by rear-wheel drive Ford trucks in North America from the 1960s to the early 1990s. The rear suspension was a live rear axle with rear leaf springs.

For the 2007 model year, all E-Series (including the E-150) had eight-lug wheels and GVWRs of over 8,500 pounds. For the 2008 model year, the chassis underwent its largest revisions of the fourth generation. In an effort to improve handling and safety, larger brakes, improved steering, and rollover stability control were added. The Twin-I-Beam layout was retained, making it the second to last Ford vehicle to use it.

==== Powertrain ====
At its 1992 launch, the fourth generation carried over its powertrain line from the third-generation model line (sharing it with the ninth-generation F-Series). A 4.9 L inline-six was standard, with a 5.0 L V8 (on E-150 only) and a 5.8 L V8 offered as options. On 350-series vans, a 7.5 L V8 and 7.3 L Navistar diesel V8 were also optional; the diesel became turbocharged in 1993. For 1995, the IDI diesel was replaced by a 7.3 L Ford Power Stroke diesel V8 (also sourced from Navistar).

For 1997, the E-Series underwent a revision of its engine lineup, retaining only the 7.3 L diesel. Sharing its gasoline engines with the tenth-generation F-Series, a 4.2 L V6 replaced the inline-6 and a 6.8 L V10 replaced the 7.5 L V8. The 5.0 L V8 and the 5.8 L V8 were replaced by 4.6 L and 5.4 L V8s, respectively. The 4.2 L V6 was only available on 150- and 250-series vans, unlike its predecessor which could also be had on 350-series vans. For 2003, the 4.6 L V8 became available on the E-250.

For 2004, the 7.3 L diesel was replaced by a 6.0 L diesel, still supplied by Navistar. While gaining an intercooler over its predecessor, due to the lack of airflow in the engine compartment (compared to Super Duty trucks), Ford had to detune the E-Series version. For 2004, the V6 was dropped and the 4.6 L V8 became the standard engine on the E-150 and E-250, making the E-Series the first American full-size van with a V8 engine standard.

For 2009, the 4.6 L and 5.4 L engines gained flexible-fuel capability (allowing them to use E85 fuel). The following year, the 6.0 L Power Stroke was dropped, ending diesel engine availability in the E-Series.

In May 2014, the final 4.6 L V8 was produced for the E-Series, with the 5.4 L V8 becoming the standard engine for 2015.

Starting with the 2017 model year, the 6.8 L V10 replaced the 5.4 L V8 as the standard engine, with a 6.2 L V8 becoming the optional engine. Both engines have flex-fuel capability and both can be converted to use CNG or LPG (propane autogas).

Since the 2021 model year, the E-Series has only used the gasoline 7.3 L V8 from the fourth-generation Super Duty truck, offered with an option for conversion to CNG or LPG.

1992–present Ford Econoline/Club Wagon/E-Series powertrain details
Engine	Configuration	Production	Fuel type	Transmission	Availability
Ford Truck Six	4.9 L (300 cu in) OHV I6	1992–1996	Gasoline	4-speed AOD automatic; 4-speed E4OD automatic; 4-speed 4R100 automatic; 5-speed 5R110W automatic (TorqShift)	E-150, E-250, E-350
Ford small block V8	4.9 L (302 cu in) OHV V8	1992–1996	Gasoline	4-speed AOD automatic; 4-speed E4OD automatic; 4-speed 4R100 automatic; 5-speed 5R110W automatic (TorqShift)	E-150
Ford small block V8	5.8 L (351 cu in) OHV V8	1992–1996	Gasoline	4-speed AOD automatic; 4-speed E4OD automatic; 4-speed 4R100 automatic; 5-speed 5R110W automatic (TorqShift)	E-150, E-250, E-350
Ford 385 V8	7.5 L (460 cu in) OHV V8	1992–1996	Gasoline	4-speed AOD automatic; 4-speed E4OD automatic; 4-speed 4R100 automatic; 5-speed 5R110W automatic (TorqShift)	E-350, E-450
Navistar IDI V8	7.3 L (444 cu in) OHV V8	1992–1994	Diesel	4-speed AOD automatic; 4-speed E4OD automatic; 4-speed 4R100 automatic; 5-speed 5R110W automatic (TorqShift)	E-350
Navistar T444E V8 (Ford Power Stroke)	7.3 L (444 cu in) OHV V8 turbocharged	1995–2003	Diesel	4-speed AOD automatic; 4-speed E4OD automatic; 4-speed 4R100 automatic; 5-speed 5R110W automatic (TorqShift)	E-350, E-450, E-550
Navistar VT365 V8 (Ford Power Stroke)	6.0 L (365 cu in) OHV 4V V8 turbocharged	2004–2010	Diesel	4-speed AOD automatic; 4-speed E4OD automatic; 4-speed 4R100 automatic; 5-speed 5R110W automatic (TorqShift)	E-350, E-450
Ford Essex V6	4.2 L (256 cu in) OHV V6	1997–2003	Gasoline	4-speed AOD automatic; 4-speed E4OD automatic; 4-speed 4R100 automatic; 5-speed 5R110W automatic (TorqShift)	E-150, E-250
Ford Triton V8	4.6 L (281 cu in) SOHC 2V V8	1997–2014	Gasoline; E85	4-speed AOD automatic; 4-speed E4OD automatic; 4-speed 4R100 automatic; 5-speed 5R110W automatic (TorqShift)	E-150; E-250 (2003–2014)
Ford Triton V8	5.4 L (330 cu in) SOHC 2V V8	1997–2016	Gasoline; CNG; E85; LPG	4-speed AOD automatic; 4-speed E4OD automatic; 4-speed 4R100 automatic; 5-speed 5R110W automatic (TorqShift)	E-150, E-250, E-350; E-450 (2008–2016)
Ford Triton V10	6.8 L (413 cu in) SOHC 2V V10	1997–2019	Gasoline; CNG; E85; LPG	4-speed AOD automatic; 4-speed E4OD automatic; 4-speed 4R100 automatic; 5-speed 5R110W automatic (TorqShift)	E-350, E-450, E-550
Ford Boss V8	6.2 L (379 cu in) SOHC 2V V8	2017–2019	Gasoline; CNG; E85; LPG	4-speed AOD automatic; 4-speed E4OD automatic; 4-speed 4R100 automatic; 5-speed 5R110W automatic (TorqShift)	E-350, E-450
Ford Godzilla V8	7.3 L (445 cu in) OHV 2V V8	2021–present	Gasoline; CNG; Propane	6-speed automatic (TorqShift)	E-350, E-450

=== Body ===
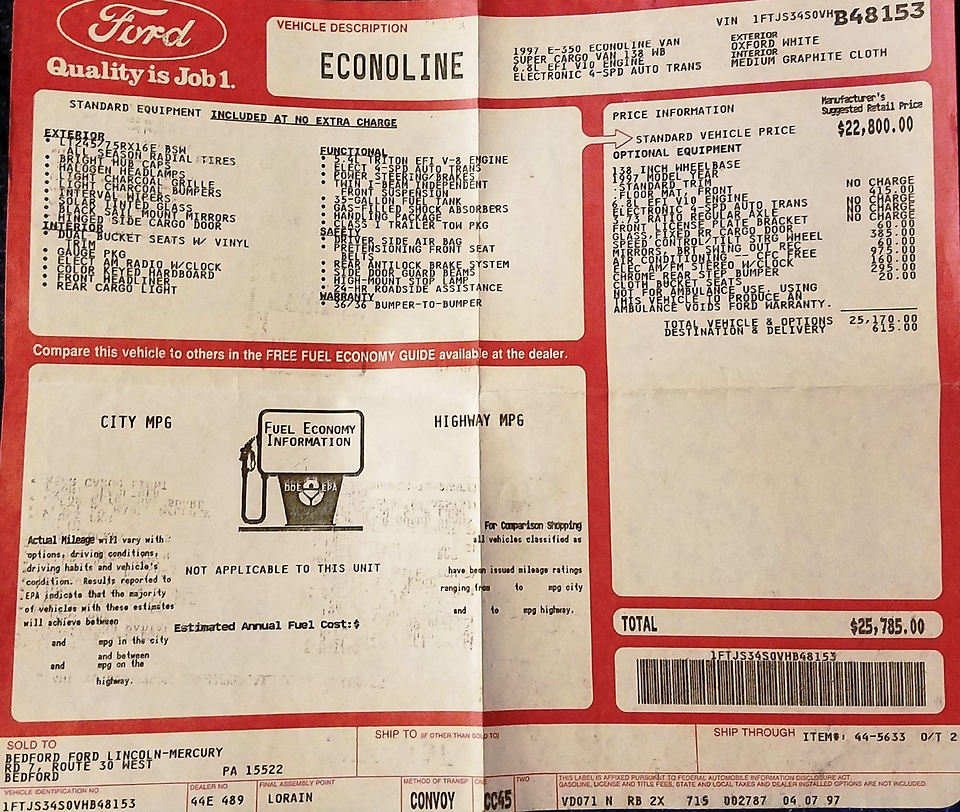
Window sticker of a 1997 Econoline

During its production, the body style of the fourth-generation E-Series underwent minor revisions in 1997 and 2003, with a major revision in 2008.

In line with the F-Series, the Econoline/E-Series was sold in 150, 250, and 350 series, denoting 1/2-, 3/4-, and 1-ton chassis (the Club Wagon was not designated by chassis size).

The body was available in two lengths, with the extended-length version exclusive to the 250 (3/4-ton) and 350-series (1-ton) chassis for both cargo and passenger vans (until 2009, when an extended-length E-150 cargo van became available). The cargo van was sold as a two-passenger vehicle, with the passenger van was sold in various configurations, accommodating up to 12 passengers on regular-length models or 15 passengers on extended-length models.

=== Trim ===
During its production, the fourth-generation model line underwent several name changes. As with the previous generation, the Econoline was sold as both a cargo van and as a passenger van (Econoline Wagon) with the Ford Club Wagon sold only as a passenger van. For 1992 the luxury-oriented Chateau trim line of the Club Wagon, dormant since 1989, made a return, slotted above the XLT trim. For 1992, the Club Wagon Chateau was awarded Truck of the Year by Motor Trend. For 2001, the Chateau was dropped, replaced by the E-150 Traveler; due to low sales, it was dropped after the 2002 model year.

=== Model history ===
==== 1992–1997 ====
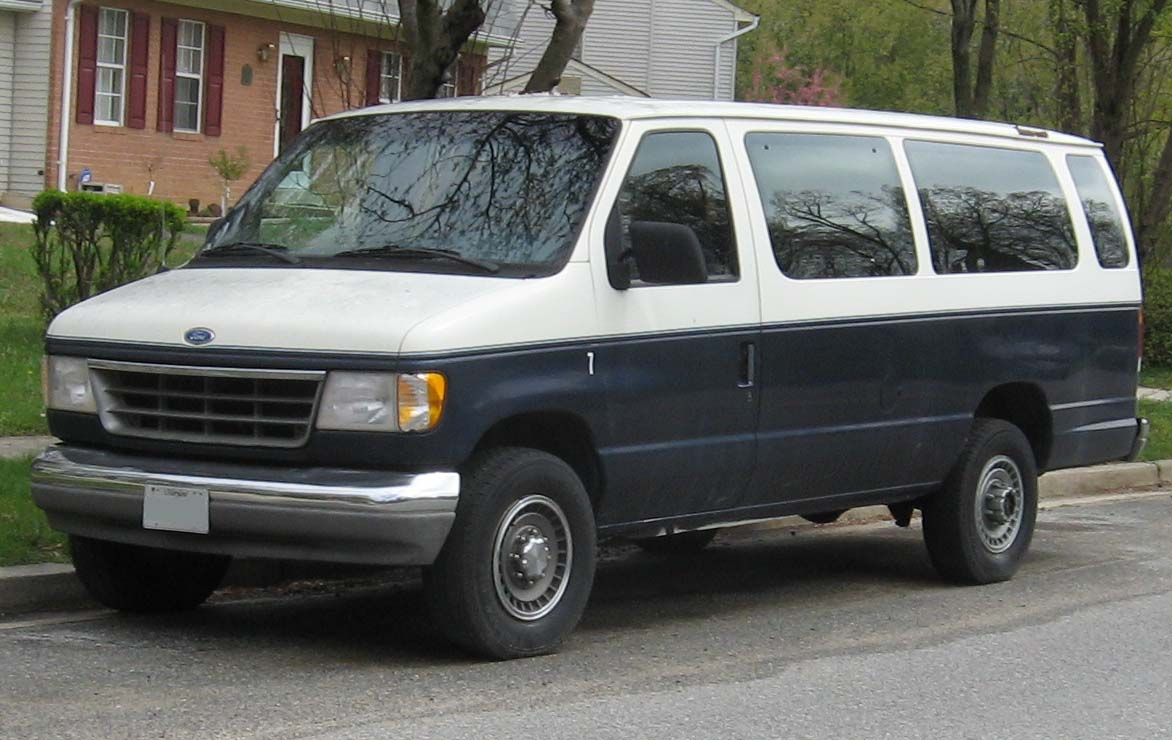
1992–1994 Ford Club Wagon (15-passenger)

For the 1992 model year, Ford introduced the fourth-generation of the Econoline/Club Wagon. While the third-generation chassis was largely carried over, the body and interior underwent a complete redesign. In contrast to its GM and Dodge competitors, the two-box body configuration made a return. To optimize the aerodynamics of the van body, the hood was angled slightly downward and the windshield was raked back (though far less than the Aerostar). If specified, all side and rear window glass was flush-mounted to the body, along with wraparound tail lamp lenses; flush-mounted composite headlamps were an option (standard on all Club Wagons). For 1992, the Econoline/Club Wagon became the first full-size vans produced with a center-mounted brake light.

When redesigning the interior, the driver compartment underwent extensive modernization. While space between the front seats was again dominated by the front-mounted engine, a redesign of the engine cover freed up additional passenger room. Sharing controls and components with the F-Series and Aerostar, the model line became the first full-size van equipped with a standard driver-side airbag (except for 350-series models, exempted by their GVWR). The instrument panel received more legible instruments (but no tachometer); a 6-digit LCD odometer replaced the previous 5-digit analog unit.

For 1994, CFC-free R134a air-conditioning refrigerant was adopted beginning with September 1993 production. For 1995, the tail lamps were revised, removing the amber turn signals. Also, as part of the North American Free Trade Agreement, Ford began exporting the Econoline full-size van to Mexico, replacing the locally-built B series wagon.

For the 1996 model year, Ford introduced a new Class 4 medium-duty variant of the Econoline, offered exclusively as either a cutaway van chassis or cab-chassis. Dubbed the E-Super Duty (in line with the F-Super Duty sold at the same time), this version was created using heavier-duty components than the existing Econoline 350 commercial models, such as a Dana 80 rear axle with higher 4.63 axle ratios, new parking brake assembly, and heavier-duty shocks to allow for a maximum GVWR of 16,000 lbs. It was offered with either the existing 7.3L diesel or 7.5L gasoline V8s, the latter eventually being replaced by the 6.8L Triton V10. It was sold in either a 158" or 176" wheelbase. Due to its shorter front nose and tighter turning circle compared to the equivalent F-Series model, the E-Super Duty was a popular choice for box truck and bus conversions.

==== 1997–2002 ====
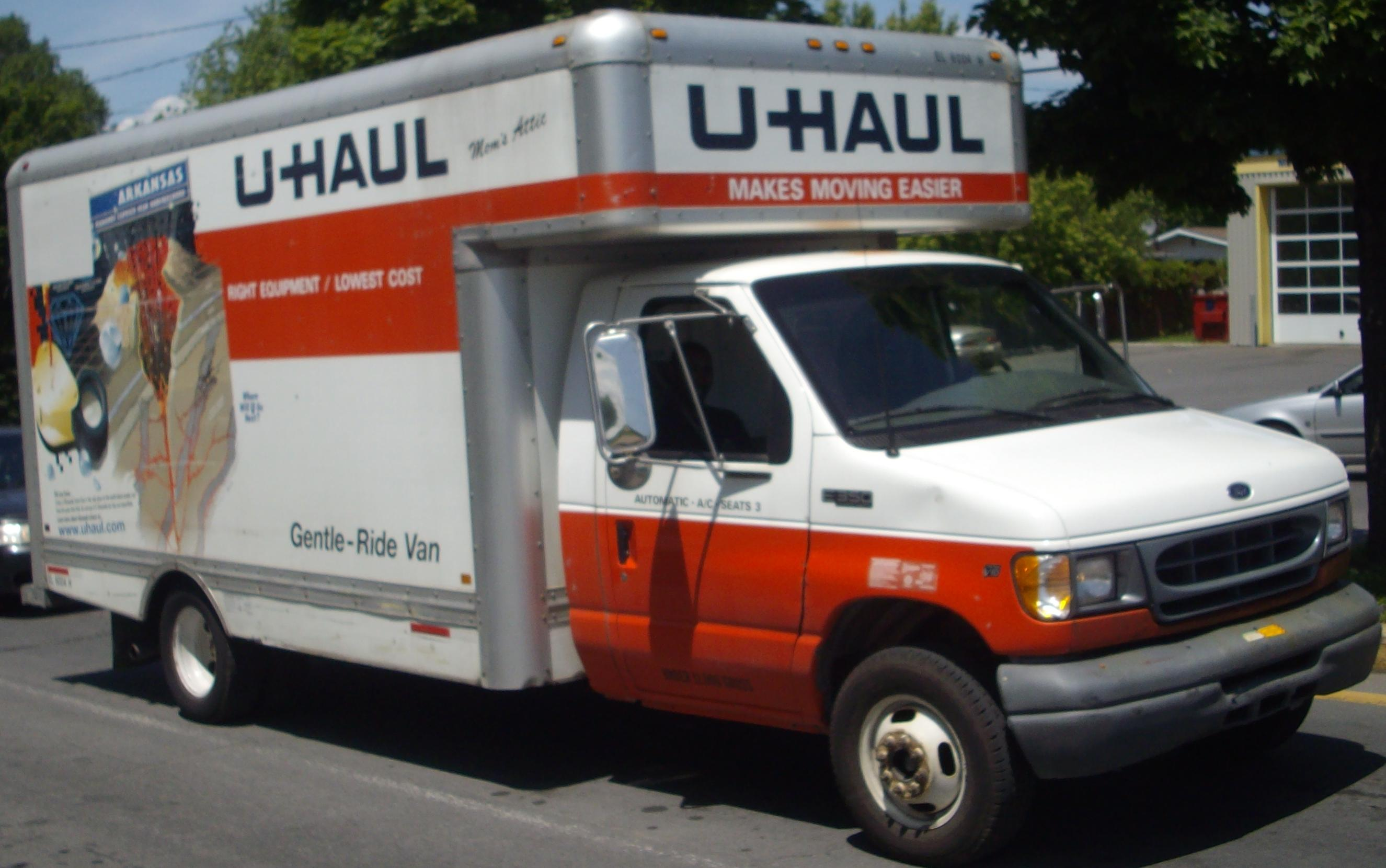
1999–2002 Ford E-350 cutaway chassis (outfitted as a U-Haul vehicle)

For 1997, the Econoline underwent a revision of both its exterior and interior, largely to bring its appearance in line with other Ford trucks. The previous egg-crate grille was replaced by an eight-hole oval-shaped cutout (matching the Explorer and F-150). For 1999, the Econoline would be renamed to the E-Series, adopting a similar naming scheme to the F-Series line. This included the E-150, E-250, and E-350, with the E-Super Duty becoming the E-450.

The interior underwent a complete redesign, adopting an all-new dashboard. Following the adoption of dual airbags (for all versions), the "brick"-style steering wheel was replaced by one with a center-mounted horn. To improve the convenience of interior controls, rotary switches for climate controls were introduced, along with a double-DIN radio. The instrument panel was redesigned, reintroducing an analog odometer. The front seats underwent a redesign, relocating the seatbelt mounting to the B-pillars.

===== Ford E-550 Super Duty (2002–2003) =====
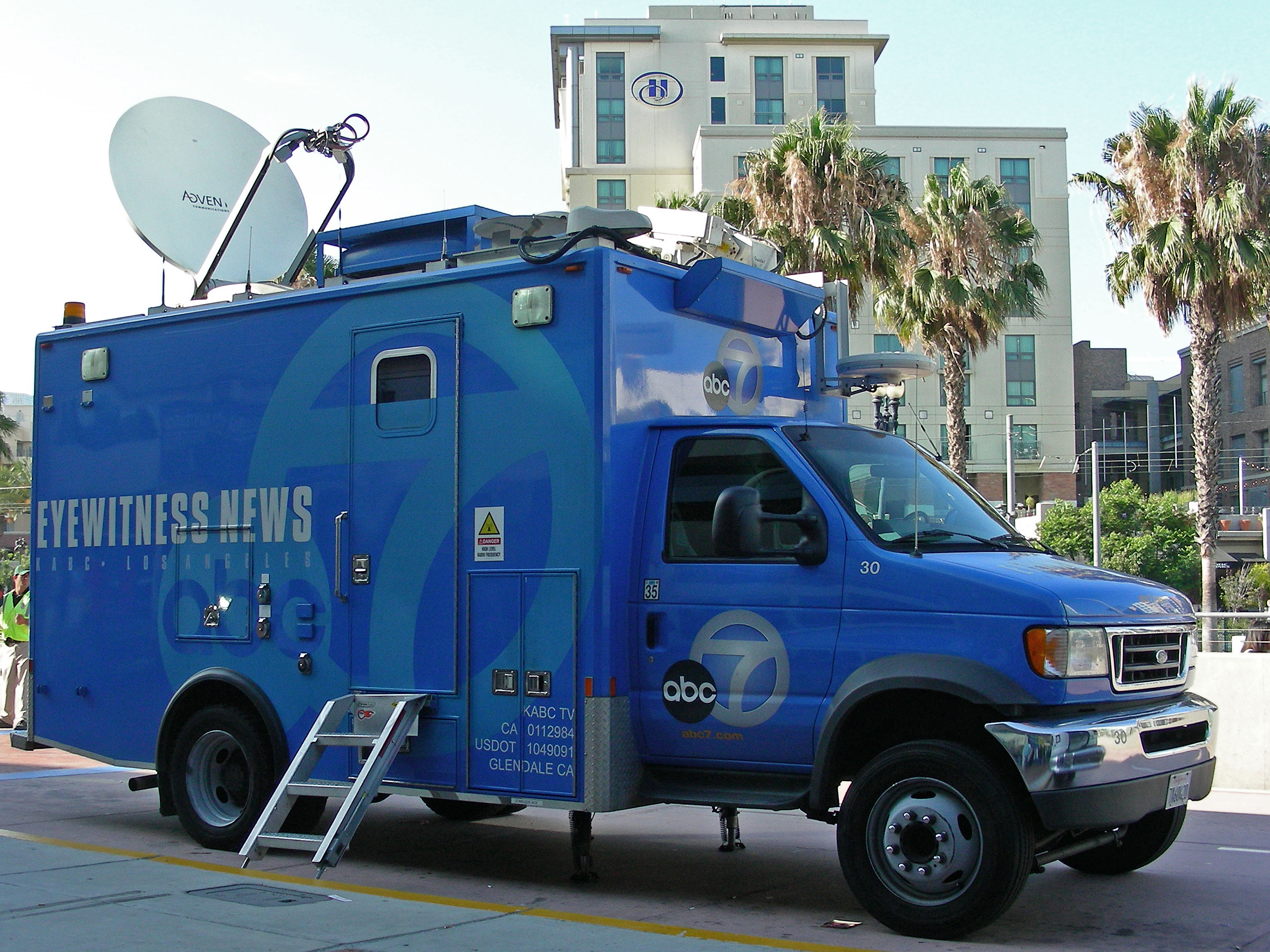
Ford E-550 Super Duty (outfitted as mobile broadcasting vehicle)

In September 2001, Ford announced it was working on a E-550 version of the E-Series for cutaway use. In 2002, Ford introduced the E-550 Super Duty as the highest-GVWR version of the E-Series with GVWRs up to 19,000 lbs. Offered solely in a cutaway-cab design, the E-550 was intended to bridge the gap between the pickup truck–derived F-450/550 Super Duty and the F-650 medium-duty trucks.

Sharing a number of chassis components with the F-550 Super Duty, the E-550 was distinguished by a grille styled in line with Super Duty pickup trucks (with a three horizontal slots between two vertical openings). To accommodate the wider, heavier-duty front axle, the van body was fitted with a larger front bumper and plastic fender flares (shared with the F-550 truck). Several wheelbases were offered, ranging between 159.5 inches and 233.5 inches; as with the Super Duty and the E-350/450, the E-550 was powered by either a 6.8L V10 or a 7.3L V8 turbodiesel.

Following the 2003 model year, Ford ended production of the E-550.

==== 2003–2007 ====
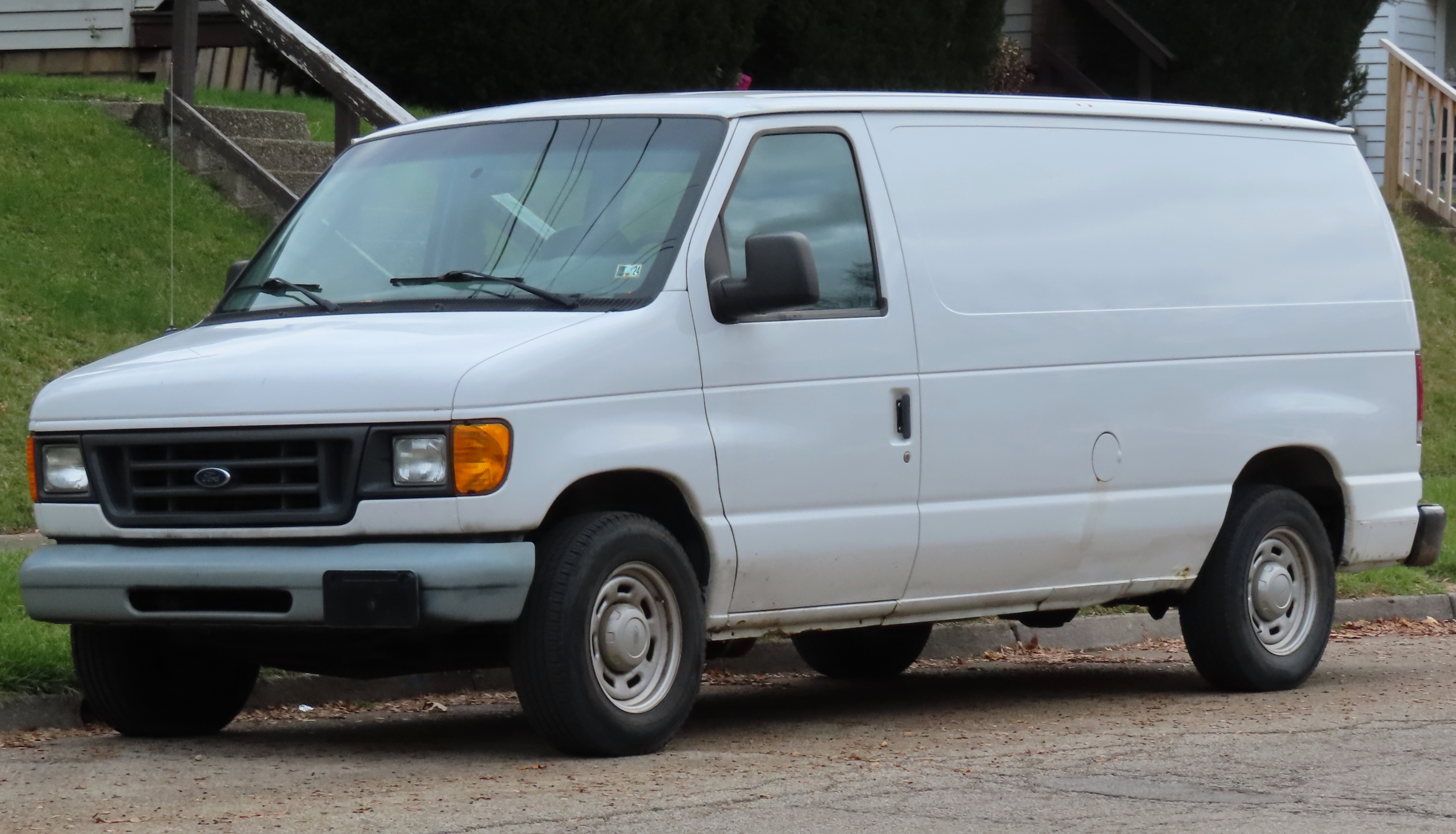
2004 Ford E-150 cargo van

For 2003, the E-Series underwent an exterior update, adopting the grille introduced by the 2002 E-550 Super Duty. The new grille shifted the Ford Blue Oval emblem from the hood to the center of the grille (for the first time since 1991); based on trim, the grille was either dark gray or chrome. The front turn signal lenses were changed from clear to amber (their first change since 1992).

Coinciding with the exterior revision, the interior saw several updates. While the dashboard remained essentially unchanged, the engine cover was redesigned (including redesigned cup holders); the design now included a center-mounted glovebox (absent from the E-Series since 1974). For 2004, the instrument cluster was updated with a digital odometer; heavy-duty vans now offered a tachometer (as an option).

==== 2008–2014 ====
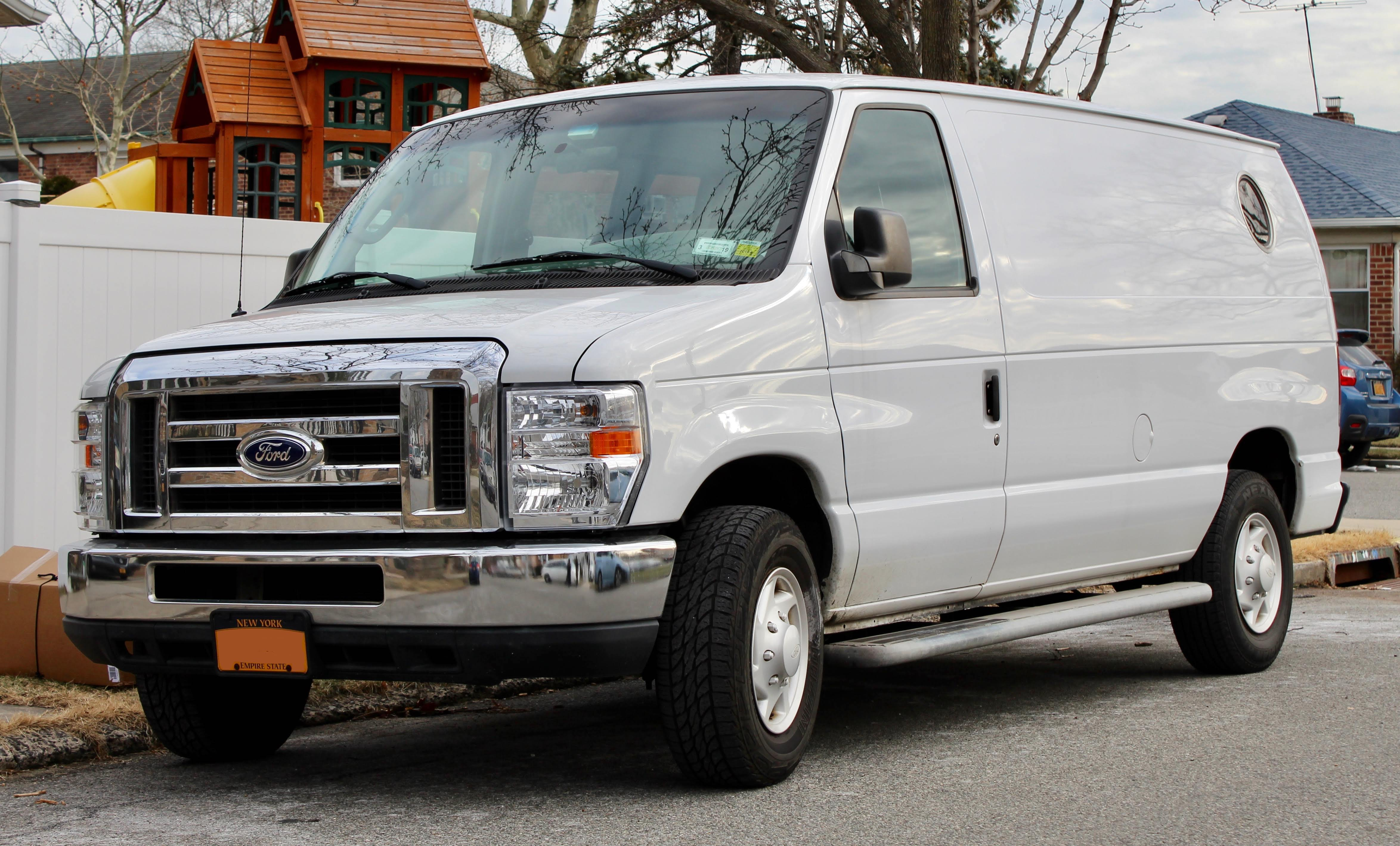
2008 Ford E-250 cargo van

For 2008, the E-Series received a restyled front-end design similar to that of the newly-redesigned Ford Super Duty trucks. The interior design carried over.

For the 2009 model year, Ford introduced a new interior for the E-Series. The instrument panel was now larger and included an enhanced message center that could display warning messages, and other information, and the front interior door panels were redesigned with "E SERIES" branding embossed into the panels. Radios were also revised, with an auxiliary audio input jack being offered as standard equipment on all radios for the first time. The Ford Sync entertainment system, designed by Microsoft, and adding USB integration and hands-free Bluetooth calling and wireless audio streaming capabilities was now also offered as an option. Finally, an optional touchscreen GPS navigation system radio was also offered, and included HD Radio on select models.

Starting with the 2011 model year, the 6.0L Power Stroke turbo-diesel V8 engine was discontinued, and the E-Series was no longer offered with a diesel engine.

==== 2015–2020 ====
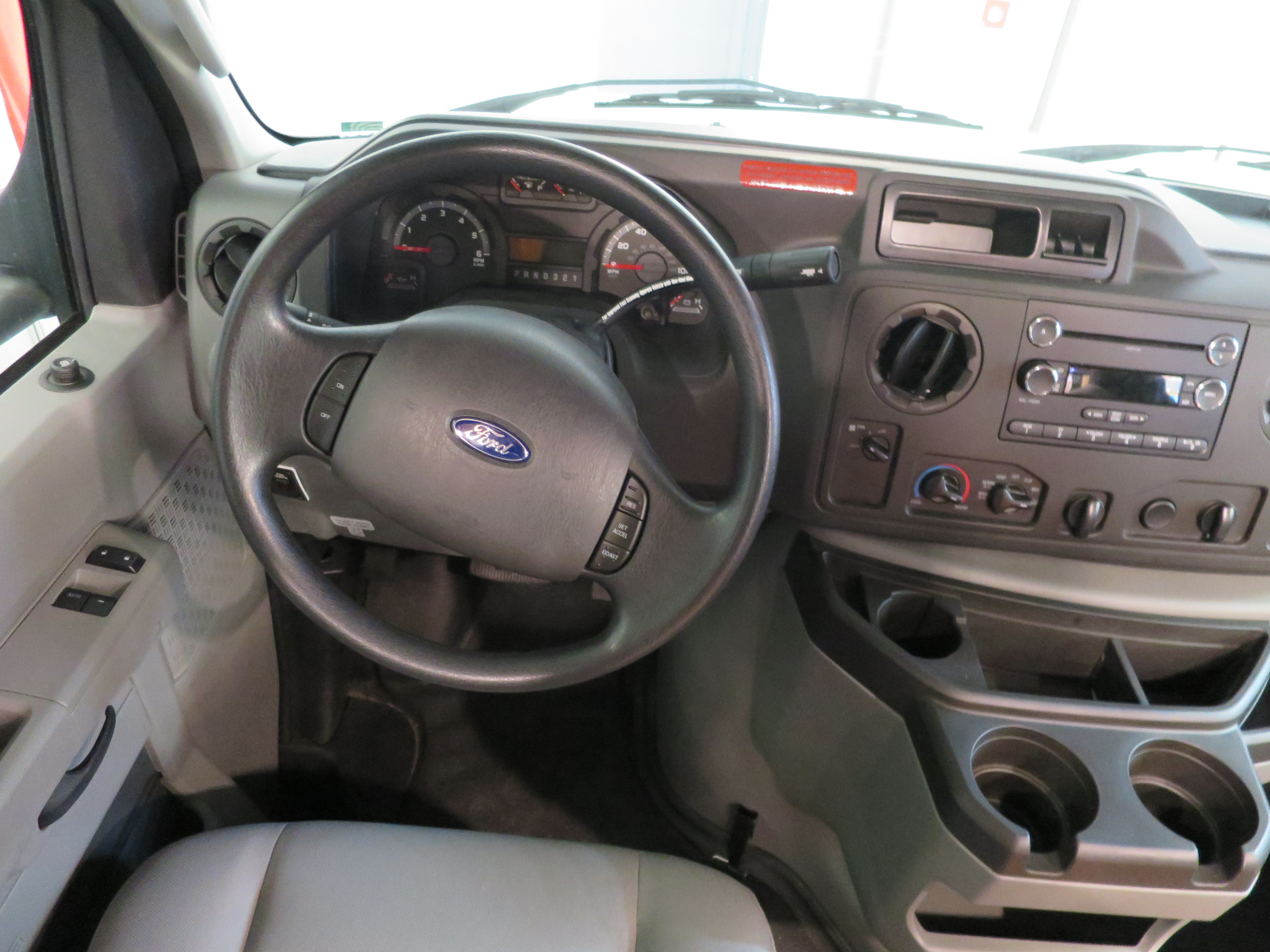
The dashboard after the 2009 redesign, used until 2020

For the 2015 model year, Ford discontinued sales of the E-Series passenger and cargo vans, replacing them with the fourth-generation Ford Transit.

Because of its popularity with upfitters who convert the chassis into recreational vehicles, buses, or other specialized vehicles, Ford announced it would continue to offer the E-Series as a cutaway chassis (open cab, to be fitted with second-party rear body), a chassis cab (enclosed cab, to be fitted with second-party rear body), and a stripped chassis (no cab, to be fitted with a complete second-party body).

Ford said it made the change, because while the E-Series had remained the best-selling vehicle in the full-size van segment since 1980, the model line had seen little change since 1992 on a chassis introduced for the 1975 model year. At the time of its 2008 update, 95% of sales were to commercial or fleet users, with nearly half of production represented by cargo vans. Sold outside of North America since 1965, the Transit was introduced to the United States and Canada, offering increased fuel economy and additional body configurations over the E-Series.

Production of the base 4.6L V8 Ford Modular engine was discontinued after the 2014 model year (at the time, the E-Series was the only Ford product to use that engine). For the 2015 and 2016 model years, the only engine options were the 5.4L V8 or 6.8L V10 Modular engines. Starting in 2017, Ford began offering the 6.2L V8 Boss engine as a replacement for the 5.4L V8 engine.

The chassis-cab configuration was eliminated starting with the 2019 model year. Ford did not produce the E-Series for the 2020 model year.

==== 2021–present ====
For the 2021 model year, the E-Series interior underwent a redesign, adopting a more modern electronic instrument cluster with steering wheel controls first developed for the fourth-generation Super Duty truck. Under the hood, all models use the larger 7.3L V8 Godzilla naturally aspirated gasoline engine also used on the fourth-generation Super Duty truck. However, the exterior design remains unchanged from the 2008 redesign.

The instrument cluster has a 2.3-inch (58 mm) monochromatic screen with an available upgrade to an 8-inch (200 mm) color screen. The new instrument panel also allowed for the addition of new optional safety equipment that was previously not available on the E-Series, including adaptive cruise control, a forward collision avoidance system, a lane departure warning system, and automatic high-beam front headlamps.

Meanwhile, the touchscreen Ford Sync infotainment system was eliminated. The only available factory audio system is a basic single DIN model with AM/FM radio, Bluetooth for hands-free calling and wireless stereo audio streaming, and a USB input.

In 2025, for the 2026 model year, the E-Series Cutaway received a new grille, its first exterior update since 2008.

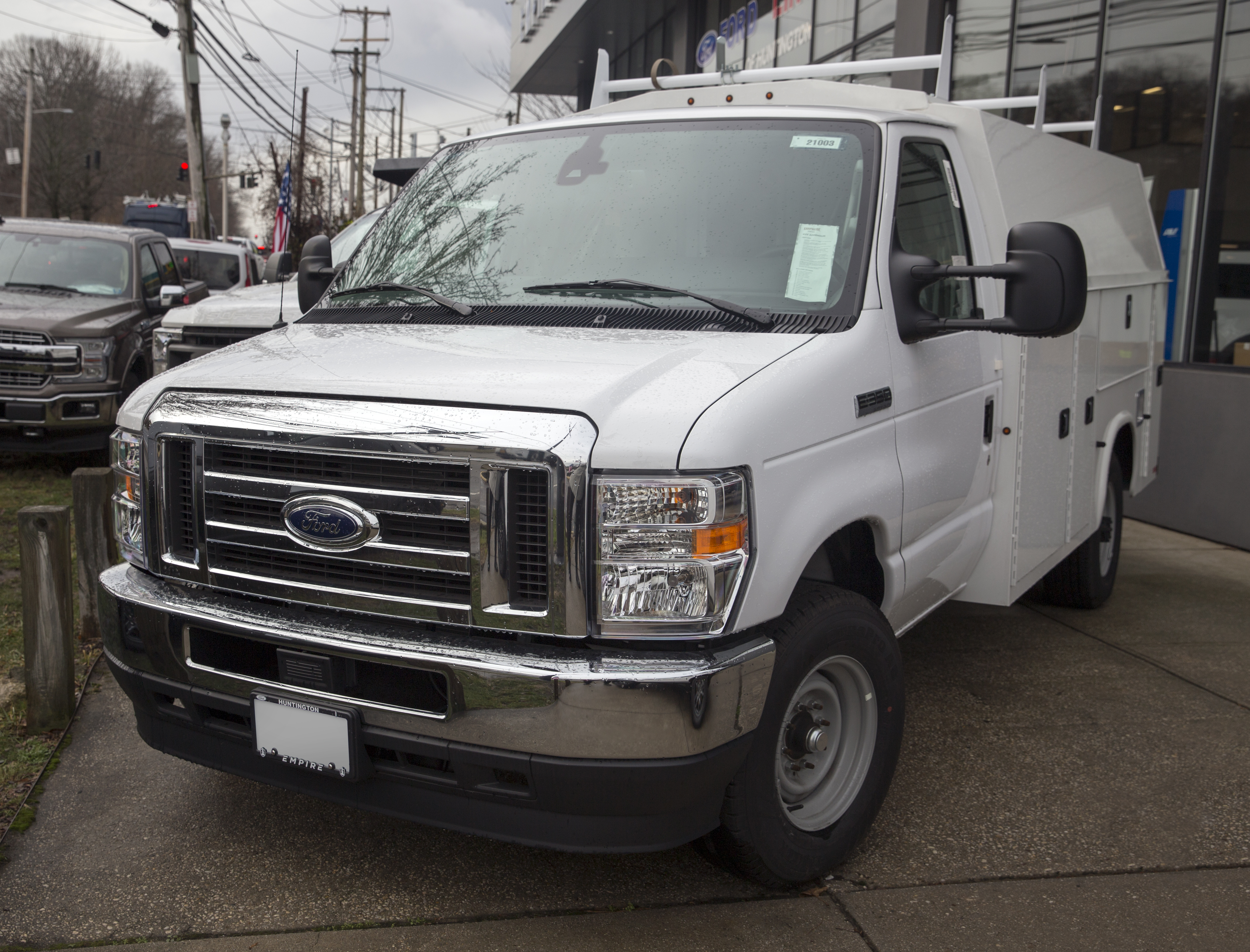
2021 Ford E-350 cutaway chassis

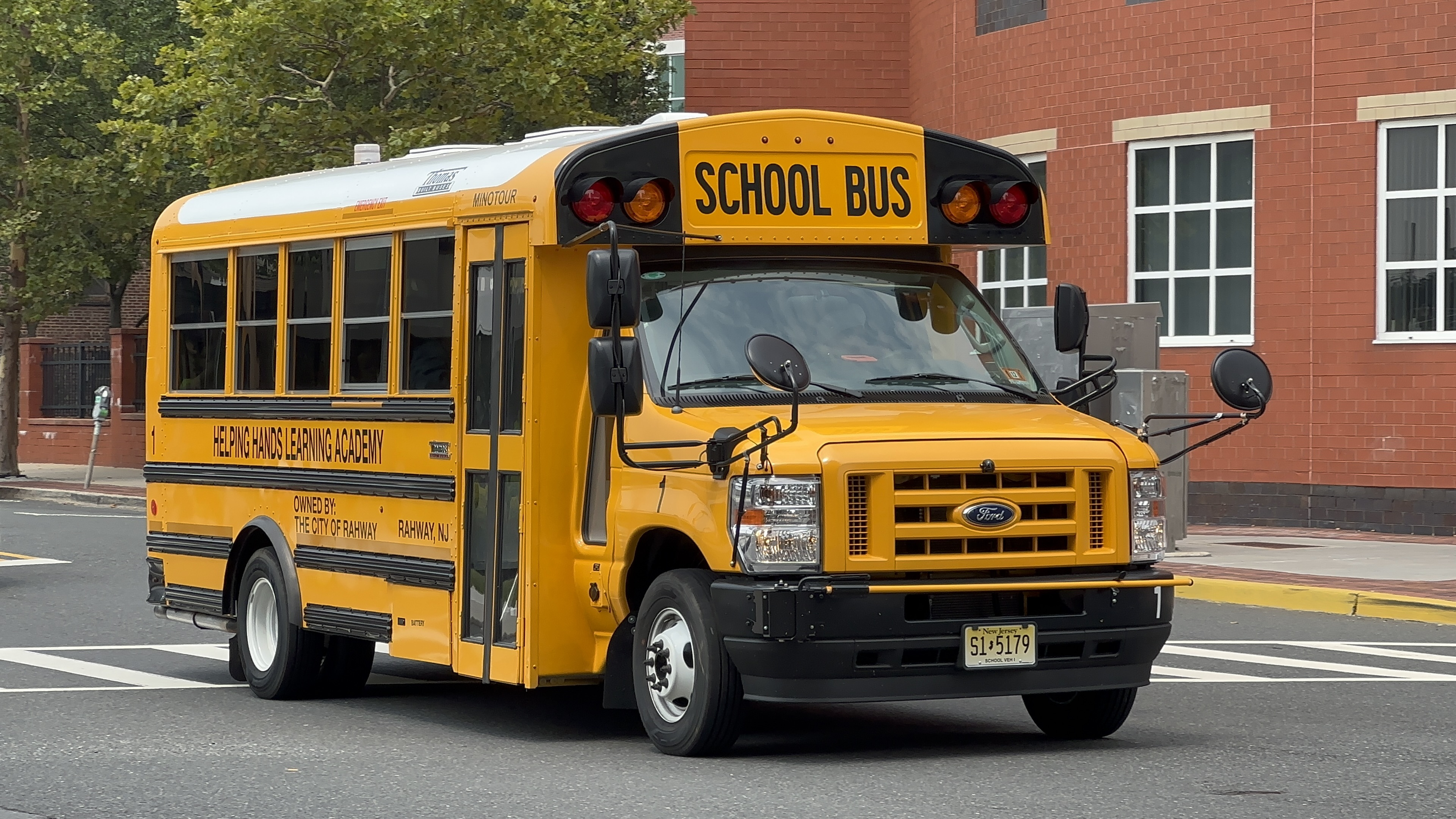

== Production and sales ==
Model year	US production
1961	61,135
1962	76,938
1963	88,053
1964	83,079
1965	76,867
1966	84,180
1967	81,752
Total	552,004

Calendar year	US sales
1997	186,690
1998	206,026
1999	202,024
2000	187,027
2001	159,565
2002	165,085
2003	161,721
2004	171,017
2005	179,543
2006	180,457
2007	168,722
2008	124,596
2009	85,735
2010	108,258
2011	116,874
2012	122,423
2013	125,356
2014	103,263
2015	50,788
2016	54,245
2017	53,304
2018	47,936
2019	45,063
2020	37,001
2021	37,122
2022	32,150
2023	42,957
Total (since 1997)	3,154,948

== Platform ==
The Econoline/E-Series platform was designated VN58 in the late 1980s. The platform architecture was introduced in 1974, when Ford introduced the third generation of the Econoline full-size van, the first produced with a full-length frame. For 1992, the fourth-generation Econoline/Club Wagon/E-Series was introduced, marking a substantial revision to the chassis architecture and a completely new body. The platform was later redesignated VN127.

Following the introduction of the V363N Ford Transit, the VN E-Series ended production as a cargo/passenger van after the 2014 model year. From the 2015 model year onward, the E-Series has remained in production as a cutaway-cab chassis (no bodywork aft of the front doors) and as a stripped chassis (with no bodywork).

This is the final chassis that uses the Ford "Twin-I-Beam" front suspension architecture.

Vehicles using this platform include:

- Ford Econoline/Club Wagon/E-Series – full size vans (VN58, about 1989; VN127 1995)
- Ford Carousel – cancelled mid-size van based on SWB Econoline (planned for 1975–1976)

== See also ==
- Ford VN platform
