= Timmy O'Neill =

American rock climber

Timmy O'Neill (born 1969) is an American professional rock climber, guide, and comedian. He is nicknamed the "Urban Ape".

O'Neill is originally from East Lansdowne, Pennsylvania, one of seven children. After whitewater kayaking as a child, he began climbing as a teenager, scaling the cables of the Brooklyn Bridge and climbing in Yellowstone. He left Temple University after one semester and worked at the Old Faithful Gift Shop in Yellowstone, and in Yosemite. He has lived in Boulder, Colorado since 2000. He climbs buildings, including the Chicago Tribune Tower, without ropes. In 2001, along with Dean Potter, O'Neill set the-then speed record for the "Nose" climb on El Capitan in Yosemite National Park, climbing it in three hours and twenty-four minutes.

O'Neill has been featured in several climbing films including Return2Sender, Front Range Freaks, and most recently 180 Degrees South. He also produced "Return2Sender", which won Best Climbing Film from the Alpine Club of Canada. He narrated and co-wrote the non-fiction comedy "Across the Atlas", about an adventure in Morocco that turned out to be less epic than the participants hoped. One of his comedy personas is "Dr Steven "Death Zone" Clark", in his "Mallory Revisited" play.

With Dennis “DJ” Skelton he co-founded a non-profit organization for disabled outdoor sport athletes, Paradox Sports, in 2007. His brother Sean broke his back jumping off a bridge into the Mississippi River and is still a climber. Paradox Sports is a 501(c)(3) nonprofit organization that improves people's lives by creating an adaptive sport community built to inspire. Currently, O'Neill is the executive director of Paradox Sports.
