= Seattle Post Globe =

The Seattle Post Globe was an Internet news site containing Web logs (blogs), photography and links to editorial sources covering events and issues in Seattle, Washington state. The online-only news operation partnered with KCTS public television and KPLU public radio in Washington state. The offices of Seattle Post-Globe were located inside the KCTS building on Mercer Street in Seattle.

== History ==
The Seattle Post Globe was founded by Kery Murakami, a former politics and metro reporter for the Seattle Post-Intelligencer newspaper, which ceased publication on March 17, 2009. Murakami, as well as several other former Post-Intelligencer journalists, created the primary content which appears on the Web site.

The site was founded under the principle of non-profit journalism, and was meant to offer editorial views that compete with The Seattle Times, as well as other mainstream media outlets in the region. It ceased publication on July 29, 2011.
