= List of major employers in Louisville, Kentucky =

Louisville's major employers include United Parcel Service, Ford Motor Company and GE Appliances.

== Major employers ==
- United Parcel Service
  - UPS Airlines
- Ford Motor Company
  - Kentucky Truck Plant
  - Louisville Assembly Plant
- GE Appliances
- Humana Inc.
- Norton Healthcare
- UofL Health
- Yum! Brands
- Brown–Forman
- Elevance Health
- ScionHealth
- Roman Catholic Archdiocese of Louisville
- LG&E and KU Energy

== Fortune 500 ==
The list below represents corporations based in Louisville that have a Fortune 500 status as of February 2026.

State Rank	Company	Fortune 500 Rank	Revenues ($ billions)
1	Humana Inc.	31	$126.4
2	BrightSpring Health	322	$13.3
3	Yum! Brands	470	$8.1

== See also ==
- Economy of Louisville, Kentucky
  - Notable companies and organizations based in Louisville
