= Economy of Louisville, Kentucky =

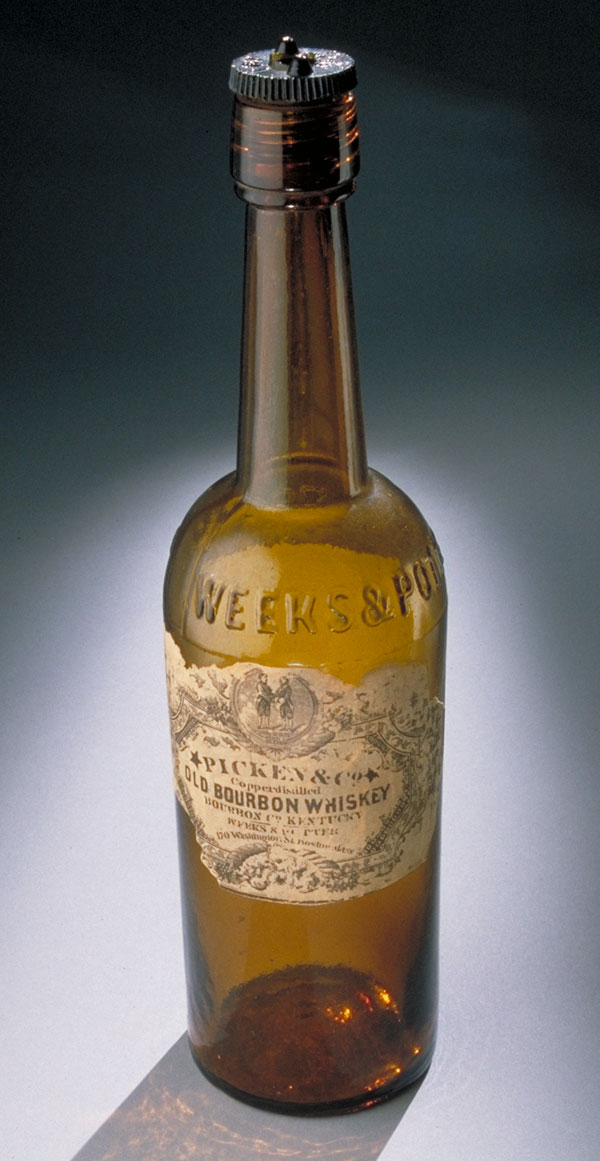
Bourbon bottle, 19th century. One-third of all bourbon whiskey comes from Louisville.

Since it earliest days, the economy of Louisville, Kentucky, has been underpinned by the shipping and cargo industries. Today, Louisville is home to dozens of companies and organizations across several industrial classifications.

== Shipping and logistics ==
The city's location at the Falls of the Ohio, and its unique position in the central United States (and other origins) to the mouth of the Mississippi River, the Gulf of Mexico, and beyond. The Louisville and Nashville Railroad was also an important link between the industrialized northern cities and the South.

Louisville's importance to the shipping industry continues today with the presence of the Worldport air hub for UPS. The city's location at the crossroads of three major Interstate highways (I-64, I-65 and I-71) also contributes to its modern-day strategic importance to the shipping and cargo industry. In addition, the Port of Louisville continues Louisville's river shipping presence at Jefferson Riverport International. As of 2003, Louisville ranks as the seventh-largest inland port in the United States.

== Health care and medical sciences ==
Louisville is a center for the health care and medical sciences industries. Louisville has been central to advancements in heart and hand surgery as well as cancer treatment. Some of the first artificial heart and hand transplants were conducted in Louisville. The James Graham Brown Cancer Center is a local cancer treatment center. The city's downtown medical research campus includes a new $88 million rehabilitation center and a health sciences research and commercialization park that, in partnership with the University of Louisville, has attracted nearly 70 scientists and researchers. Louisville is also home to Humana, one of the nation's largest health insurance companies.

Norton Healthcare is the second-largest employer in the Louisville area, with over 20,000 employees, and a major health care provider throughout Greater Louisville and Southern Indiana.

== Product manufacturing: Automotive, home appliances, bourbon and more ==
Louisville is a significant center of manufacturing. Within the city's limits are two major Ford plants, namely the Kentucky Truck Plant and the Louisville Assembly Plant. Also located in the city is the headquarters and major home appliance factory of GE Appliances (a subsidiary of Haier). GE Appliance Park is set to become the largest home appliance manufacturing site in the U.S.

The city is a major center of the American whiskey industry, with about one-third of all bourbon coming from Louisville. Brown-Forman, one of the major makers of American whiskey, is headquartered in Louisville and operates a distillery in the Louisville suburb of Shively. The current primary distillery site operated by Heaven Hill, called the Bernheim distillery, is also located in Louisville near Brown-Forman's distillery. Other distilleries and related businesses can also be found in neighboring cities in Kentucky, Barton 1792 (Bardstown), Jim Beam (Clermont), Wild Turkey (Lawrenceburg), or Maker's Mark (Loretto, with a restaurant/lounge in Louisville). Similar to the Kentucky Bourbon Trail that links these central Kentucky locations, Louisville offers tourists its own "Urban Bourbon Trail", where people can stop at nearly 20 "area bars and restaurants, all offering at least 50 labels of America's only native spirit."

Craft beer is an increasingly profitable business for the city, home to over 14 locally owned breweries including Bluegrass Brewing Company and Falls City Brewing Company. In 2013 overall beer sales were reported to be down 2% from the previous year, whereas craft beer sales had risen 18%. To keep up the demand, Mayor Greg Fischer announced in 2015 plans to create "Lou Brew": a tour, similar to the Urban Bourbon Trail, that will highlight the local breweries and craft beer scene of Louisville to both natives and tourists.

== High tech ==
Not typically known for high tech outside of the previously identified industries, Louisville in the 2010s has been at or near the forefront of some high-tech-related developments. In April 2017, Google Fiber confirmed that the city will be wired for its ultrafast network, though the company ultimately abandoned the plan. Meanwhile, since October 2016, AT&T Fiber has been building out its similar service in the city as well as neighboring counties in Indiana. Beyond networking, the city, through its public–private partnership called Code Louisville, recognized by President Barack Obama, is aiding area residents in the learning of software coding skills.

In December 2025, Taiwan-based technology firm Foxconn announced it will invest $173 million to build its first U.S. manufacturing facility in Louisville, creating 180 jobs. The 350,000-square-foot "factory of the future" will be outfitted with artificial intelligence and robotics in all phases of consumer electronics production, from design and assembly to logistics. It is part of Foxconn's "Made in America" initiative, aimed at strengthening the country's supply chains.

== Independent businesses ==
Louisville prides itself in its large assortment of small, independent businesses and restaurants, some of which have become known for their ingenuity and creativity. In 1926 the Brown Hotel became the home of the Hot Brown "sandwich". A few blocks away, the Seelbach Hotel, which F. Scott Fitzgerald references in The Great Gatsby, is also famous for a secret back room where Al Capone would regularly meet with associates during the Prohibition era. The room features a secret back door escape and was used as a starting point for rumrunners who would transport illegal moonshine from the hills of eastern Kentucky to Chicago. Also, in 1880, John Colgan invented a way to make chewing gum taste better for a longer period of time.

The Highlands area of Louisville on Bardstown Road has many independent businesses, including the Preston Arts Center, Baxter Avenue Theater, Carmichael's book store, Heine Brothers' Coffee, John Conti Coffee, Wick's Pizza, Steilberg's String Instruments and O'Shea's Irish Pub, among others. Several local breweries such as Milewide Brewing, Gravely Brewing, Great Flood Brewery, Akasha, Apocalypse, Holsopple, New Albanian Brewery of New Albany, Indiana, Browning's Restaurant and Brewery, Cumberland Brews, and the Bluegrass Brewing Company offer an assortment of local brewing talent in the area.

One Louisville independent business receiving wide acclaim is Omega Mirror Products, the largest manufacturer of mirror balls. At the height of the disco era, they manufactured 90% of all mirror balls in the United States.

== Other industries ==
Louisville has connections to the entertainment industry. Several major motion pictures have also been filmed in or near Louisville, including Goldfinger, The Insider, Stripes, Lawn Dogs, Elizabethtown, Demolition Man, and Secretariat.

Also located in Louisville is a branch of the Federal Reserve Bank of St. Louis.

== Historical businesses ==
Louisville for a long time was also home to the Belknap Hardware and Manufacturing Company, at its peak one of the largest manufacturers and wholesale distributors of hardware in the United States, as well as Brown & Williamson, the third largest company in the tobacco industry before merging with R. J. Reynolds in 2004 to form the Reynolds American Company. Brands such as KOOL, Viceroy, Capri, Misty and Raleigh were introduced in Louisville. Brown & Williamson, one of the subjects of the tobacco industry scandals of the 1990s, was the focus of The Insider, a 1999 film shot around the Louisville area.

== Notable companies, company divisions and organizations based in Louisville ==
- 21c Museum Hotels
- ADP
- Atria Management Company
- Block Starz Music
- BrightSpring Health Services(Fortune 500; formerly ResCare)
- Brown-Forman (Fortune 1000)
- CafePress
- Carewise Health
- Crosley Radio
- GE Appliances (subsidiary of Haier)
- Hillerich & Bradsby (manufacturer of Louisville Slugger baseball bats until the division's sale in 2015)
- Hilliard Lyons
- Humana (Fortune 500)
- KFC
- Long John Silver's
- Norton Healthcare
- Papa John's
- PharMerica
- Presbyterian Church (USA)
- Republic Bank & Trust Company
- ScionHealth
- Texas Roadhouse (Fortune 1000)
- Thorntons
- Tumbleweed Tex Mex Grill & Margarita Bar
- UPS Airlines
- Yum! Brands (owners of KFC, Pizza Hut, and Taco Bell) (Fortune 500)
- ZFX Inc.

== See also ==
- Louisville Business First – Louisville's weekly business newspaper
- Greater Louisville Inc. – Formerly the Louisville Area Chamber of Commerce
