= Code Louisville =

Code Louisville is a public–private partnership program in Louisville, Kentucky, with the aim of fostering software developers to bolster technological innovation in the region. It received national attention in April 2015 when President Barack Obama visited the region to announce TechHire and promote the value of the federal government working with local governments.

== Purpose ==
Code Louisville is a public–private partnership program in Louisville that began in November 2013. Metro Louisville Department of Economic Growth and Innovation, Greater Louisville Inc., EnterpriseCorp, the Louisville Free Public Library, and KentuckianaWorks are partnered with local employers partner who hire graduates of the program. It is a free 12-week online coding course open to those with a library card. It aims to foster software developers in the area, so as to bolster a technological innovation in the region. The program works in collaboration with Treehouse, including a prerequisite course.

== Effectiveness ==
The program has been lauded for its success compared to similar programs in other cities. In April 2015, President Obama visited Louisville to praise the program and to use it as an example of the federal TechHire initiative that provides grants to similar programs. In 2015, it was announced that Code Louisville would attempt to create a program to teach others cities how to run similar programs.

== See also ==
- Public-private partnerships in the United States
