= Lincoln Navigator =

Full-size luxury SUV

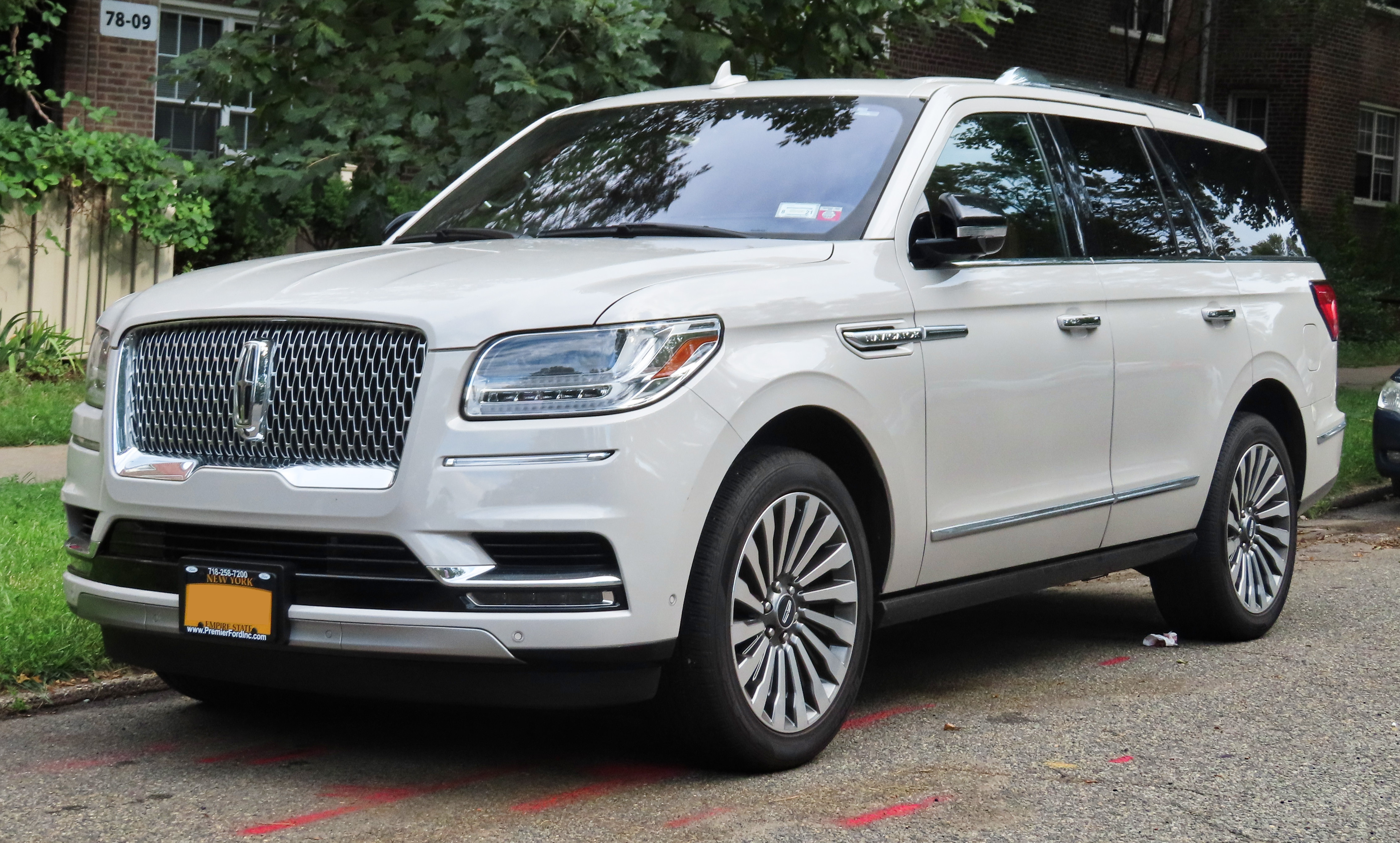
- 2019 Lincoln Navigator

Overview
- Manufacturer: Lincoln (Ford Motor Company)
- Production: May 1997–present
- Model years: 1998–present
- Assembly: Wayne, Michigan, U.S. (Michigan Assembly Plant: 1997–2009); Louisville, Kentucky, U.S. (Kentucky Truck Plant: 2009–present)

Body and chassis
- Class: Full-size luxury SUV
- Body style: 5-door SUV
- Layout: Front engine, rear-wheel drive / four-wheel drive
- Chassis: Body-on-frame
- Related: Ford Expedition; Ford F-Series

The Lincoln Navigator is a full-size luxury SUV marketed by the Lincoln Motor Company brand of Ford Motor Company since the 1998 model year. Sold in North America, it is based on the Ford Expedition. It is the heaviest production Lincoln, the Lincoln with the greatest cargo capacity, and the first non-limousine Lincoln to offer seating for more than six people.

Production was sourced from 1997 to 2009 at the Michigan Assembly Plant in Wayne, Michigan. Since 2009, production has also been sourced from the Kentucky Truck Assembly in Louisville, Kentucky.

== Background ==
At the end of the 1980s, in the United States, sport-utility vehicles gradually began to transition from dedicated off-road vehicles towards dedicated family vehicles, similar to station wagons. In 1991, the Jeep Grand Wagoneer (SJ) ended its almost unchanged 28-year production run. The vehicle had gained a famous reputation for its high content, featuring the same content as a luxury sedan. A smaller, unibody Grand Cherokee (ZJ) was induced during 1992 that offered new luxury equipment and class-exclusive features. General Motors introduced the Oldsmobile Bravada in 1990 and Ford later introduced the Mercury Mountaineer in 1996, convincing several other manufacturers to introduce mid-size luxury SUVs. As full-size SUVs such as the Chevrolet Suburban and Ford Expedition are highly profitable vehicles, the Lincoln Navigator was positioned by Ford as a full-sized, luxury SUV.

== First generation (1998) ==
First generation
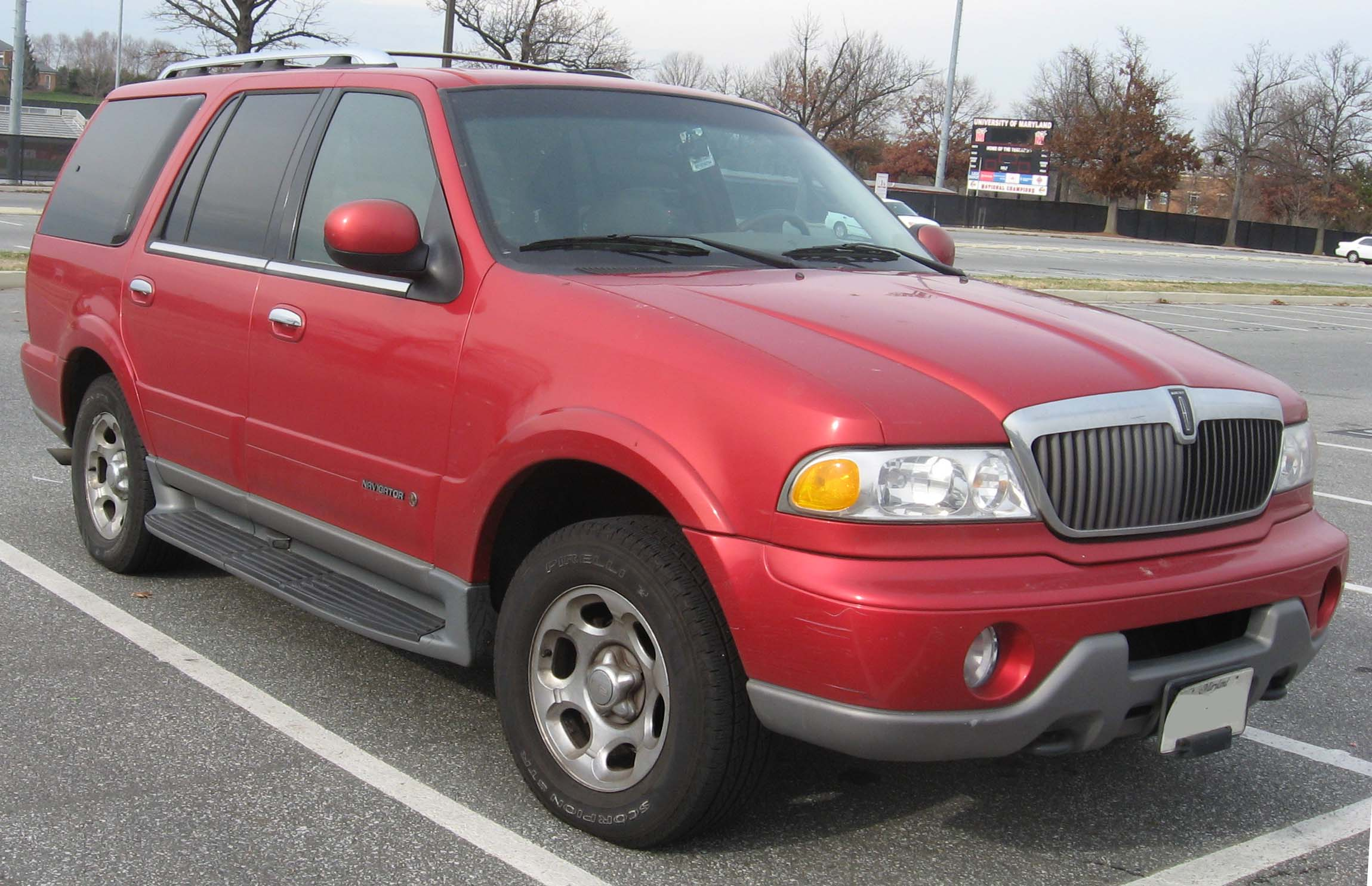

Overview
- Model code: UN173
- Production: May 1997 – March 2002
- Model years: 1998–2002
- Assembly: Wayne, Michigan, U.S. (Michigan Assembly Plant)
- Designer: Fritz Mayhew (1994)

Body and chassis
- Platform: Ford P platform
- Related: Lincoln Blackwood

Powertrain
- Engine: 5.4 L Triton SOHC V8; 5.4 L InTech DOHC V8
- Transmission: 4-speed 4R100 automatic

Dimensions
- Wheelbase: 119.0 in (3,020 mm)
- Length: 204.8 in (5,200 mm)
- Width: 79.8 in (2,027 mm) (1998–99); 79.9 in (2,030 mm) (2000–02)
- Height: 72.7 in (1,847 mm) (1998–99 2WD); 75.2 in (1,910 mm) (2000–02 2WD); 76.7 in (1,948 mm) (4WD)

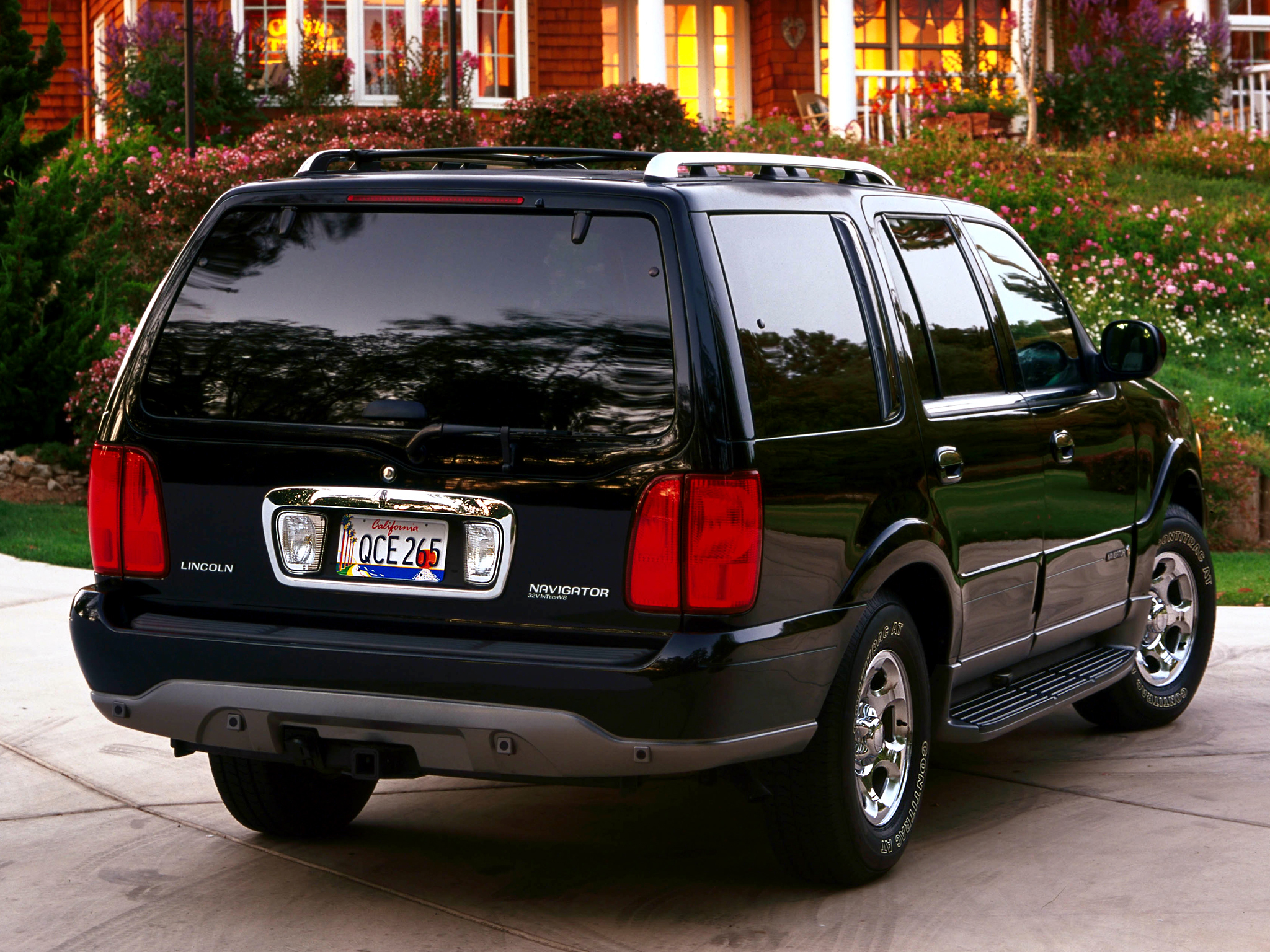
1998 Navigator's rear

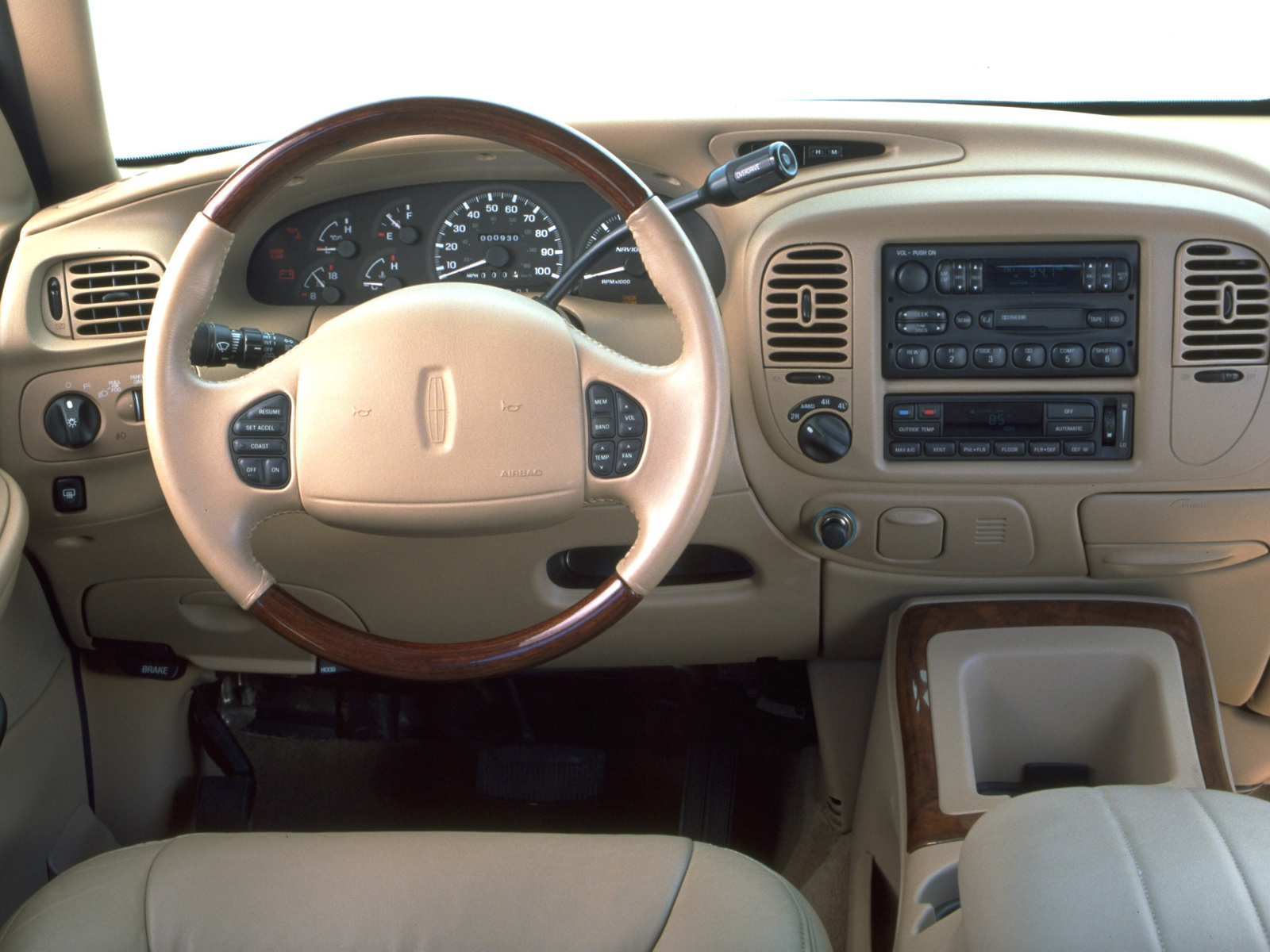
Navigator interior

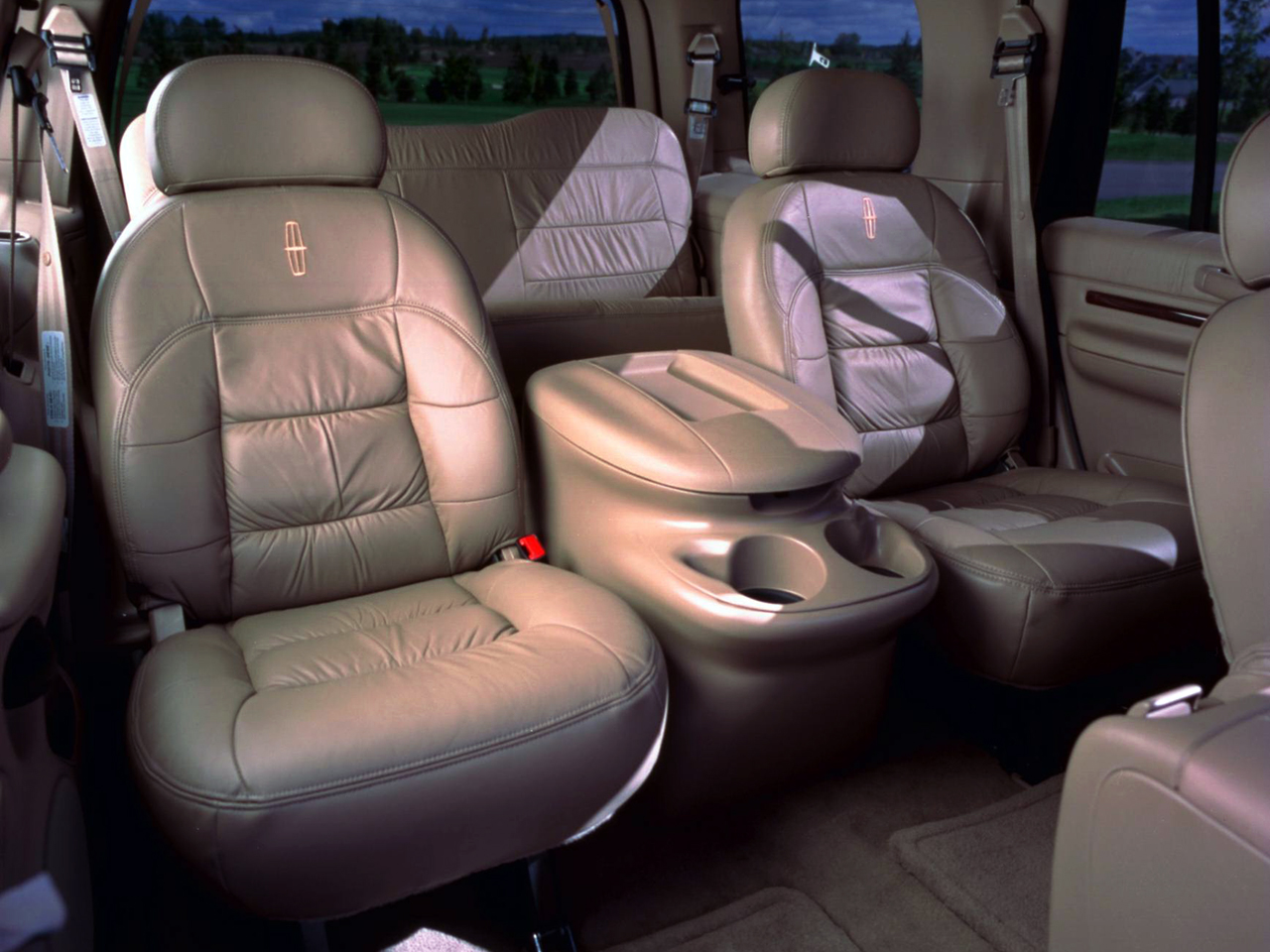
Navigator interior rear passenger seating

The Lincoln Navigator was launched on July 1, 1997, for the 1998 model year, with the first vehicle rolling off the assembly line on May 14, 1997. Based directly on the Ford Expedition, introduced the year before, the Navigator gave the Lincoln-Mercury division its first full-size SUV (slotted above the Ford Explorer-based Mercury Mountaineer).

In its first calendar year of sales (i.e. 1998), Navigator contributed to an unprecedented event of recent decades – with Lincoln overtaking perennial rival Cadillac in annual sales volume. Initially, published figures indicated that Cadillac had outsold Lincoln by a scant 222 vehicles sold, thanks to an enormous surge in Cadillac Escalade sales in December 1998, from hundreds in previous months to almost 5,000. A subsequent audit resulted in a retraction/apology in May 1999, attributing the "error" to "overzealous" "low-level" employees.

=== Chassis ===
The Lincoln Navigator was also developed under the Ford program code name UN173, with the Expedition developed under the UN93 program code name. A full-size body-on-frame vehicle, the Navigator was mechanically related to the Ford Expedition; both vehicles were related to the 1997 Ford F-Series. The Navigator featured independent front suspension (short-long arm/SLA); the rear suspension was of a live rear axle design. Using an optional feature from its Ford counterpart, the Navigator was designed with load-leveling air suspension; tuned primarily for ride comfort, the air suspension lowered itself when the vehicle was parked.

Although technically available with rear-wheel drive, the primary drivetrain on the Lincoln Navigator was ControlTrac, a computer-controlled automatic four-wheel drive system. As with the Expedition, the Navigator was fitted with four-wheel anti-lock disc brakes.

Using the same 230 hp 5.4L Triton V8 as the Expedition/F-150 paired with the 4-speed 4R100 automatic transmission, the 1998 Lincoln Navigator came with a towing capacity of 7,700 lb (3,493 kg). During 1999, Lincoln would fit two different engines in the Navigator in an effort to better match full-size SUVs from General Motors. At the beginning of the model year, the Triton V8 was upgraded to 260 hp; as a running change during the model year, Lincoln would replace the SOHC Triton with a 300 hp DOHC 5.4L V8, named InTech (borrowing a name from the Mark VIII). Due to the increase in power, towing capacity would increase to over 8,500 lb (3,900 kg).

=== Body ===
Although the Lincoln Navigator shares the same bodyshell as the Ford Expedition, giving it a similar exterior appearance, Lincoln stylists would make many design changes to differentiate the two vehicles. Forward of the windshield, the Lincoln Navigator shares no body panels with its Ford counterpart, with its own front fascia (a grille design shared with the 1998 Lincoln Town Car and the 2000 Lincoln LS), wheels, roof rack, lower body trim, and taillights. The interior of the two vehicles shared more commonality, with the dashboard common to both vehicles (with greater use of wood trim); the Navigator was given its own seat design. To make for a quieter interior over the Expedition and Ford F-Series, the Navigator made greater use of sound deadening materials and higher-quality carpeting.

The Lincoln Navigator included standard features available or optional on the Expedition, including power driver and passenger bucket seats, 2nd-row bucket seats (with a 2nd-row bench seat as a delete option), floor consoles, and keyless entry. The few options available included a power moonroof, a universal garage door opener, 7 seven to 8 eight passenger seating an electrochromic rearview mirror (filtering out headlight glare from vehicles seen in the mirror), and a premium audio system (a seven speaker, 290-Watt audio system with a 6-disc front console-mounted CD-changer, and rear seat audio controls), and 17-inch alloy wheels.

Some of the unique features on the first-generation Navigator were power-adjustable pedals (a first-of-its-kind feature on a luxury SUV), a feature on the factory radio that only illuminated the controls necessary for the selected function, full controls for the audio system, climate controls, and cruise controls on the front of the steering wheel, and rear seat radio and climate controls.

During its production run, Lincoln made few changes to the first-generation Navigator. In 1999, alongside the addition of the InTech V8, power-adjustable brake and accelerator pedals were added; the previously optional 17-inch wheels became standard, while an updated instrument cluster features a digital odometer.

For the 2000 model year, the fender-mounted radio antenna was integrated into the right-rear window, while the interior received Nudo leather seating surfaces. The carpeting and netting on the rear of the two front seats were replaced with leather and buttoned map pockets respectively, and the recessed tray on the rear center console's lid for those Navigators that had rear captain's chairs instead of bench seats was replaced with a flat leather lid. The options list expanded to include a satellite navigation system, a reverse-sensing system, side-impact airbags, optional heated seats and cooled front seats, the first manufacturer to offer climate controlled front seats, provided by Amerigon. User-controlled by individual dash-mounted switches, ambient cabin air was drawn into the system and either heated or cooled by a solid-state heat pump, using a thermo-electric device (TED) to convert electric current into the desired hot or cold thermal effect, and conditioned air is circulated via a fan through ducts in the seat cushion and seat back, to heat or cool the surface.

For the 2001 model year, several minor cosmetic changes were made. On the hood's grille and tailgate, the Lincoln emblem was given a black background (replacing the previous red); on the tailgate, the Lincoln and Navigator badging switched sides. A VHS-based video entertainment system became an option.

For the 2002 model year, the Navigator featured a molded Lincoln badge on the steering wheel center, as well as optional heated and cooled seats.

== Second generation (2003) ==
Second generation
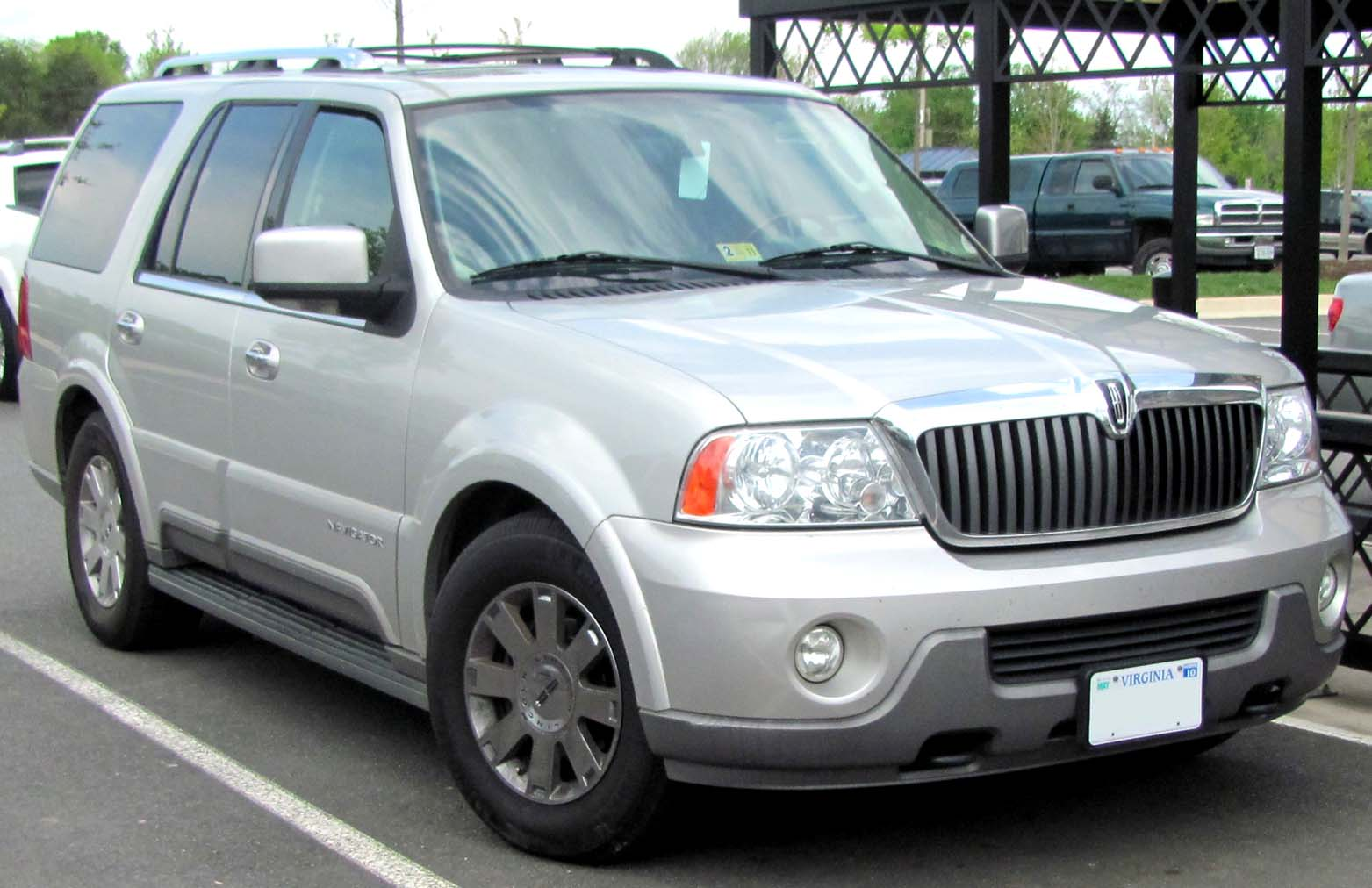

Overview
- Model code: U228
- Production: April 2002 – 2006
- Model years: 2003–2006
- Assembly: Wayne, Michigan, U.S. (Michigan Assembly Plant)

Powertrain
- Engine: 5.4 L InTech DOHC V8; 5.4 L Triton SOHC V8
- Transmission: 4-speed 4R100 automatic 6-speed ZF 6HP26 automatic

Dimensions
- Wheelbase: 118.8 in (3,020 mm)
- Length: 206.0 in (5,230 mm) (2003–04); 207.5 in (5,270 mm) (2005–06)
- Width: 78.7 in (1,999 mm) (2003–04); 80.2 in (2,040 mm) (2005–06)
- Height: 77.8 in (1,980 mm)

Launched in May 2002 for the 2003 model year, a number of changes and improvements were made to the Navigator thanks to a thorough redesign. The Navigator continued to share a platform with the Ford Expedition, which was also redesigned for 2003, but continued to differ from it in terms of styling and various upscale features. The redesign featured a thoroughly revised exterior, the first since the Navigator's launch, with only the front doors and roof panel unchanged from the previous generation. The new exterior came with features such as a larger chrome waterfall grille, brighter quad-beam headlights with larger housings, revised chrome door handles set in color-keyed bezels, and slightly wider running boards.

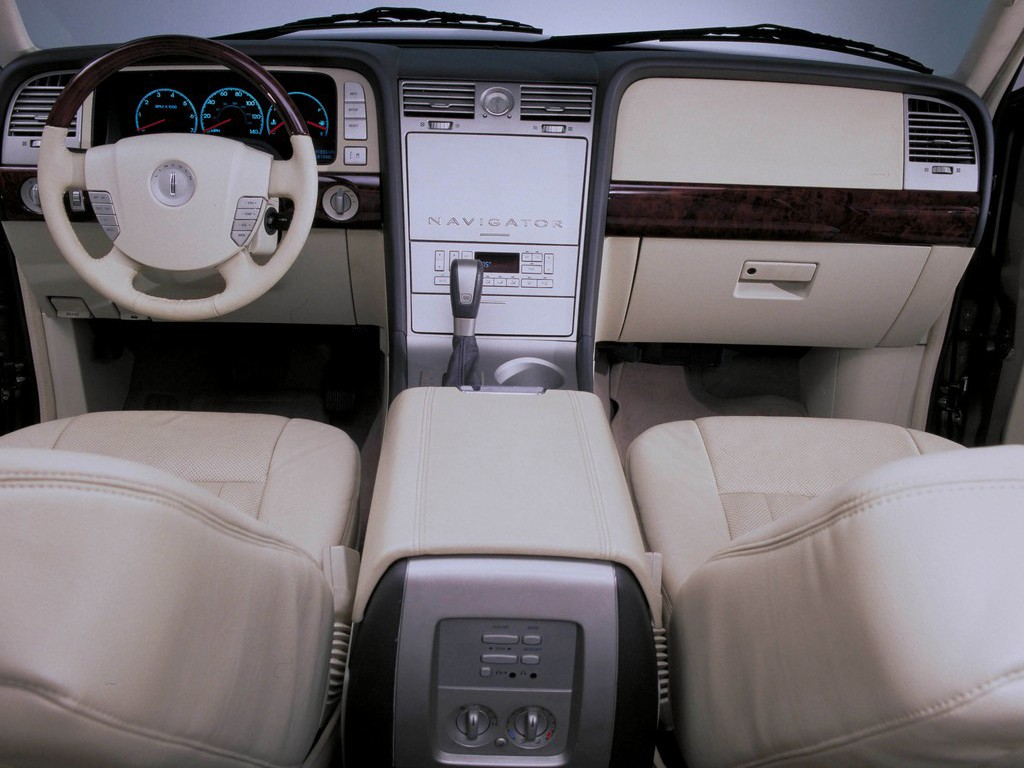
Dashboard of a 2003 Lincoln Navigator

Inside, the Navigator features an all-new instrument panel and dashboard area which, significantly, was not shared with the Expedition. Inspired by the symmetrical, "dual-cockpit" layout of the 1961 Lincoln Continental, the instrument panel and dashboard area was adorned with real walnut burl wood inserts and panels and switches painted with a low-luster satin nickel color. Adding to the upscale interior design further were white LEDs, 120 in all, which provided backlighting for controls and switches. Additionally, to direct attention to the high-quality satin nickel-faced analog clock mounted in the dashboard, an articulating door is present to conceal the radio head unit and optional satellite navigation system when they are not in use.

Highlighting the Navigator's design changes were other new features and options for 2003. Newly available features like Ford's Safety Canopy side curtain airbags and a tire pressure monitoring system improved occupant safety. Convenience was enhanced by the availability of power running boards (an industry first), power-folding third row seats, a power liftgate, and HID headlights (for top end models). The available rear-seat video entertainment system was updated to be DVD-based and all Navigators now came with standard 18×7.5-inch alloy wheels with 18×8-inch chrome wheels available as an option.

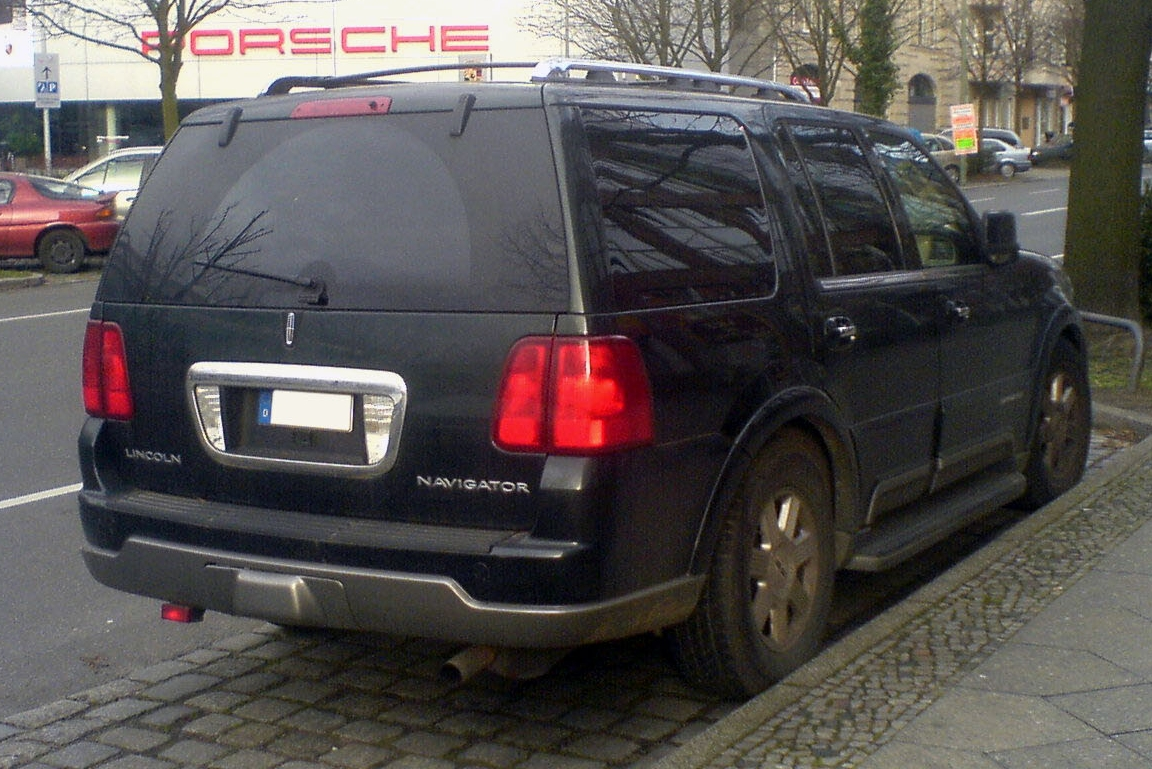
2003–2004 Lincoln Navigator in Germany

Like the redesigned 2003 Expedition (U222), the Navigator benefited from a reworked chassis, new rack-and-pinion steering, and an all-new independent rear suspension (IRS), which brought better handling and ride comfort. The Navigator continued to benefit from a load-leveling air suspension but it now lowered the vehicle by an inch when stopped in the interest of easing entry and exit. The Navigator's powertrain was modified from the UN173, but the 5.4 L DOHC V8 used before was no longer advertised under the InTech name. But it now produced 300 hp (224 kW; 304 PS) at 5500 rpm and 355 lb⋅ft (481 N⋅m) of torque at 3750 rpm. Due to changes brought with the redesign, the Navigator's base curb weight increased to 5,760 lb (2,613 kg) in two-wheel drive models and nearly 6,000 lb (2,700 kg) in four-wheel drive models. In turn, towing capacity dropped slightly.

Tire-pressure monitoring was made standard for the 2004 model year while Ford's AdvanceTrac, a type of traction control system, with Roll Stability Control was an option. In 2004 for the 2005 model year, the Navigator received a minor facelift with new square-shaped foglights replacing the circular ones used previously. AdvanceTrac with RSC was now standard while HID headlights were available on all models. In the interest of cost effectiveness, the 5.4 L DOHC V8 introduced in the 1999 model year was replaced by the same 5.4 L 3-valve SOHC V8 that had been available in the F-150 since the 2004 model year. Though having a different head design, the new engine offered similar overall output, producing 300 hp (224 kW; 304 PS) at 5000 rpm and 365 lb⋅ft (495 N⋅m) of torque at 3750 rpm. The new engine was not marketed under the Triton name in the Navigator even though it is mechanically identical to the F-150's engine. The 4R75W 4-speed automatic transmission used from 2003 until 2004 was replaced with a new ZF-sourced 6-speed automatic transmission. The 2005 Navigator's base curb weight fell to 5,555 lb (2,520 kg) while four-wheel drive models dropped to 5,842 lb (2,650 kg). Towing capacity increased slightly over the previous model year to 8,600 lb (3,901 kg) in two-wheel drive models and 8,300 lb (3,765 kg) in four-wheel drive models. In 2005 for the 2006 model year, an Elite package for the Ultimate trim level was made available, including a DVD-based satellite navigation system with a voice-activated touch screen, THX audio system, rear-seat DVD entertainment system, and HID headlights.

=== Navigator K Concept ===
In 2003, Ford Performance Group introduced the Navigator K concept, the first Lincoln concept vehicle from the group. It was unveiled at the New York Auto Show after a rumor that Cadillac was to produce a V12 version of the Escalade EXT. The Navigator K produces 385 horsepower (287 kW; 390 PS), thanks to the Ford SVT Lightning supercharged 5.4L V8 engine. Feature-wise, it was identical to the “Ultimate” trim level. It was named to pay homage to the Model K, which rejuvenated the Lincoln brand in 1931.

On the exterior, the Navigator K came with 20-inch chrome wheels, a monochromatic scheme, chrome rearview mirrors, chrome front tow hooks, and a polished stainless steel exhaust tip. The interior was available in red only, with satin nickel trim replacing the real walnut burl wood trim that was available in final version of the Navigator. It had red leather seats with black piping all around the bolsters. The steering wheel, unlike production Navigator versions, was all leather-wrapped.

=== In popular culture ===
The Lincoln Navigator is featured in the 2005 family comedy film Are We There Yet?, where Ice Cube’s character Nick Persons drives the SUV throughout much of the story.

== Third generation (2007) ==
Third generation
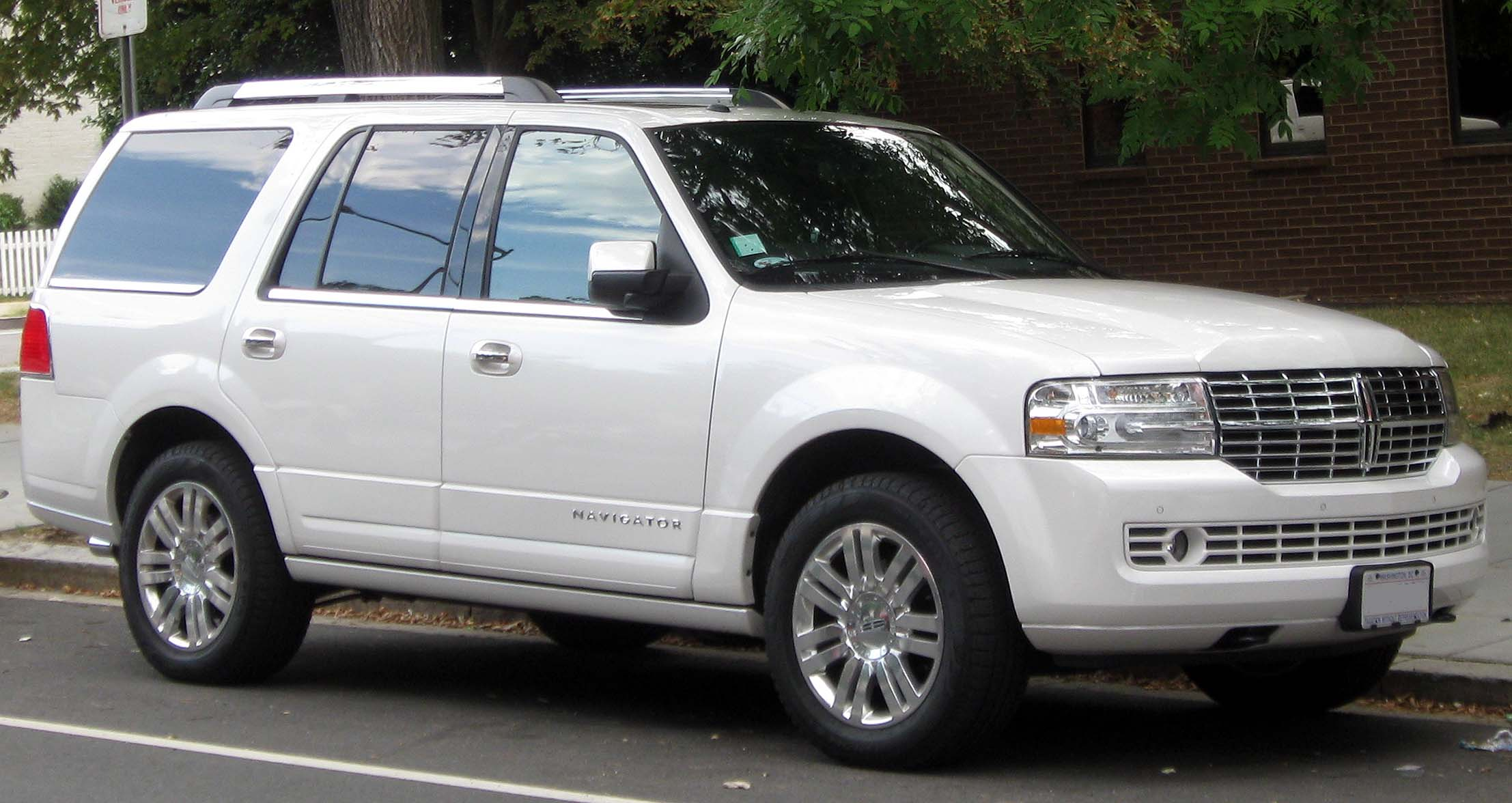

Overview
- Model code: U326; U418 (L)
- Also called: Lincoln Navigator L Lincoln Navigator L Limousine (with conversion)
- Production: August 2006 – July 2017
- Model years: 2007–2017
- Assembly: Wayne, Michigan, U.S. (Michigan Assembly Plant: 2007–2009); Louisville, Kentucky, U.S. (Kentucky Truck Assembly: 2009–2017)

Body and chassis
- Platform: Ford T1 platform

Powertrain
- Engine: 5.4 L Triton SOHC V8; 3.5 L EcoBoost V6 turbo
- Transmission: 6-speed ZF 6HP26 automatic; 6-speed Ford 6R80 automatic

Dimensions
- Wheelbase: 119.0 in (3,023 mm); 131.0 in (3,327 mm) (L)
- Length: 208.4 in (5,293 mm); 223.3 in (5,672 mm) (L)
- Width: 78.8 in (2,002 mm); 78.1 in (1,984 mm) (L 2WD); 79.7 in (2,024 mm) (L 4WD)
- Height: 78.3 in (1,989 mm)
- Curb weight: 5,780–5,986 lb (2,622–2,715 kg); 6,031–6,239 lb (2,736–2,830 kg) (L)

The Navigator was redesigned under the U326 program code name, with new styling and mechanical features for the 2007 model year. Unveiled at the Chicago Auto Show in February 2006, the Navigator featured its most distinctive styling update since its introduction, with new front and rear fascias and side cladding. In front was a split upper and lower chrome grille with integrated fog lights resembling those of classic Lincolns like the 1946–1948 Continental, along with a more complex headlight design and a more prominent "power dome" hood. Elsewhere, an updated rear fascia featured taillights inspired by the Lincoln MKZ and chrome trim was more prominently used along the sides, including chrome lower body molding on the doors. The interior featured an updated dashboard and instrument panel with an extensive use of rectangular shapes, such as in the gauges, as well as greater use of real wood and satin nickel accents.

Accompanying the Navigator's redesign for 2007 was a new model, the Navigator L developed under the U418 program code name. Comparable to the Cadillac Escalade ESV, the Navigator L is 14.7 in (373 mm) longer than the standard Navigator on a 12 in (305 mm) longer wheelbase, increasing its cargo capacity. The Navigator L was introduced parallel to the Expedition EL, an extended version of the Ford Expedition. Both the Navigator and Expedition were redesigned for 2007 and based on Ford's T1 platform, which is related to the platform of the 2004+ F-150. Compared to the Navigator's previous platform, this platform provided greater rigidity for better driving dynamics. The independent rear suspension was replaced with a five-link IRS design to improve handling and ride quality. The Navigator continued to come with standard 18-inch alloy wheels, but both 20- and 22-inch wheels became available. The 5.4 L 3-valve SOHC V8 introduced in the 2005 Navigator remained unchanged for 2007. The ZF Friedrichshafen 6-speed automatic transmission was replaced by Ford's own 6-speed design, the 6R80 in 2008 for the 2009 model year. Due to the Navigator's redesign, its base curb weight increased to 5,872 lb (2,663 kg) in two-wheel drive models and 6,070 lb (2,753 kg) in four-wheel drive models. Navigator L models were even heavier, at 5,963 lb (2,705 kg) in two-wheel drive models and 6,221 lb (2,822 kg) in four-wheel drive models. In spite of this, thanks to an improved frame, the Navigator's towing capacity increased for 2007, approaching 9,000 lb (4,100 kg) in two-wheel drive models.

After the 2007 model redesign, the Navigator no longer used the same transfer case as the Expedition. Expedition four-wheel drives continued to use a two-speed dual range transfer case with off-road low range reduction gearing and default off-road program that remaps (reprograms) the electronic throttle control and traction control system response for off-road conditions. Navigator four-wheel drives were demoted to a light-duty one-speed single range transfer case which lacks low-range gearing.

For the 2008 model year, packaging for the Navigator's luxury and convenience features was simplified, resulting in the elimination of the Luxury and Ultimate trim levels and the standardization of a number of features that were previously optional. Some of these newly standard features included heated and cooled front seats, power-folding third row seats, a power liftgate, and a 600-watt 14-speaker THX II-Certified audio system. Also newly standard was a 3.31:1 rear axle ratio, though a 3.73:1 ratio was still available as option for the Navigator and remained standard in the Navigator L. Newly available was a rearview camera to aid in backing up.

For the 2009 model year, the Navigator's 5.4 L V8 gained 10 hp (7.5 kW) as well as flex-fuel capability. The rearview camera that was new for the 2008 model year was now standard, as were heated second row seats, Front Park Assist, a capless fuel filler, rain-sensing windshield wipers, and Lincoln SYNC.

The third generation Navigator and Navigator L continued to be offered for the 2010 model year, with only slight changes.

For the 2011 model year, both the Navigator and the Navigator L featured HD Radio, Sirius TravelLink, and Lincoln SYNC as standard on all trims. The optional 20-inch chrome aluminum wheels offered from 2007 to 2010 model years were replaced with 20-inch polished aluminum wheels.

For the 2013 model year, the only changes made to the Navigator were the addition of new color trims: Kodiak Brown Metallic Tri-Coat, Midnight Sapphire Metallic, and Ruby Red Metallic Tinted Clearcoat.

The 2014 model year was a carryover from 2013 model year with the same features and no cosmetic changes. This would be the last model year that it would feature the front grille fascias.

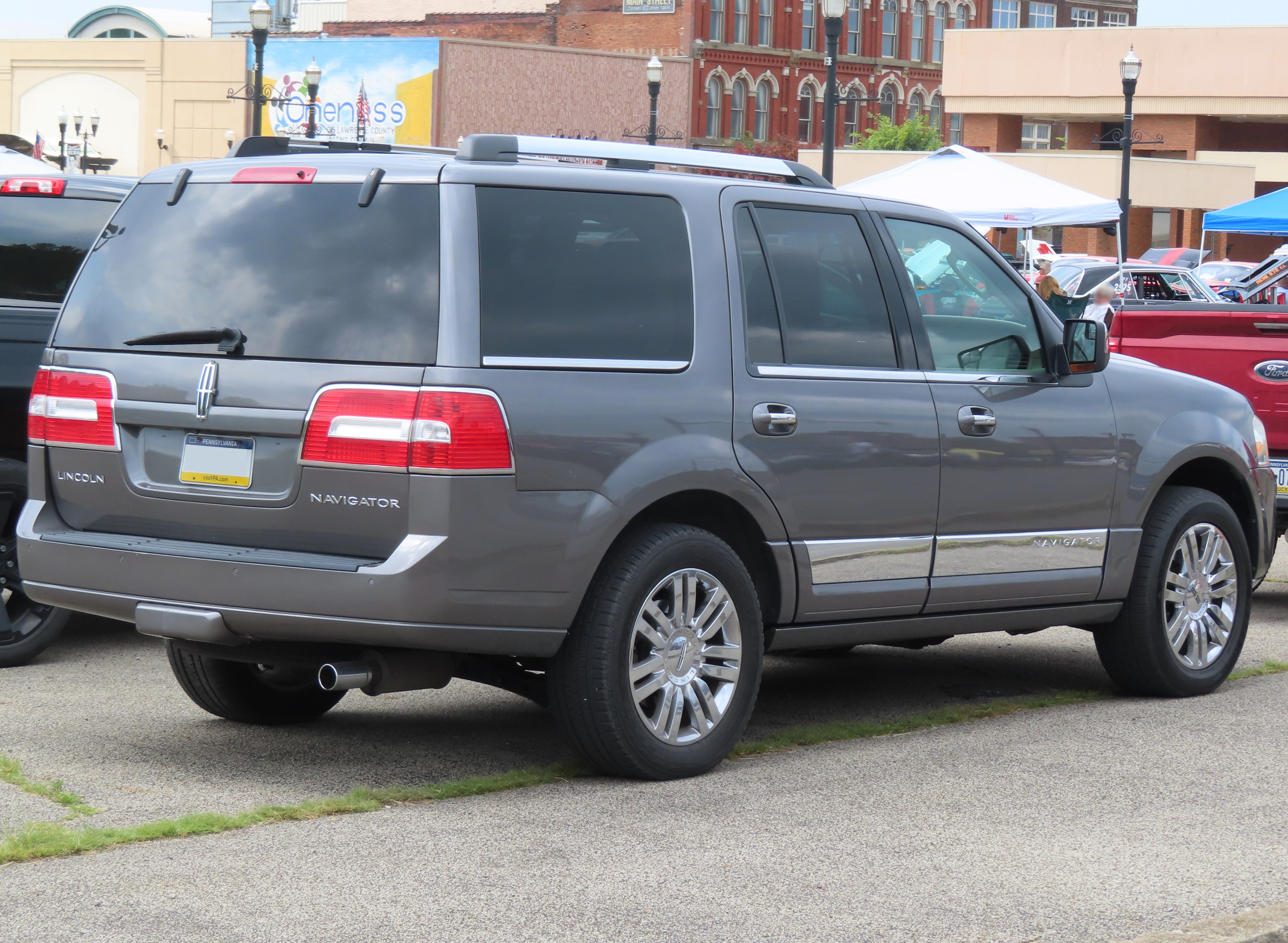
2007–2014 Lincoln Navigator (SWB model)

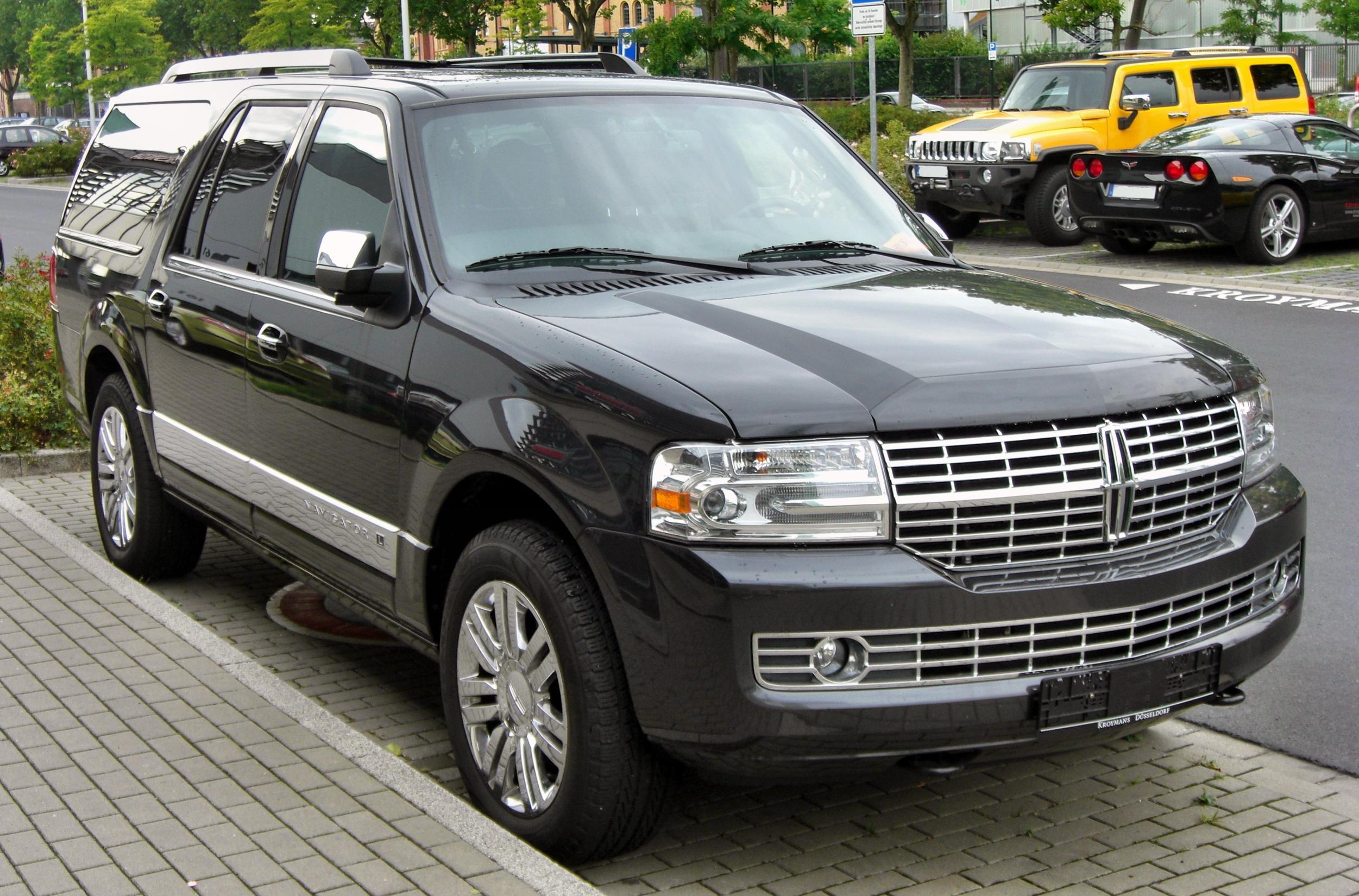
2007–2014 Lincoln Navigator L (LWB model)

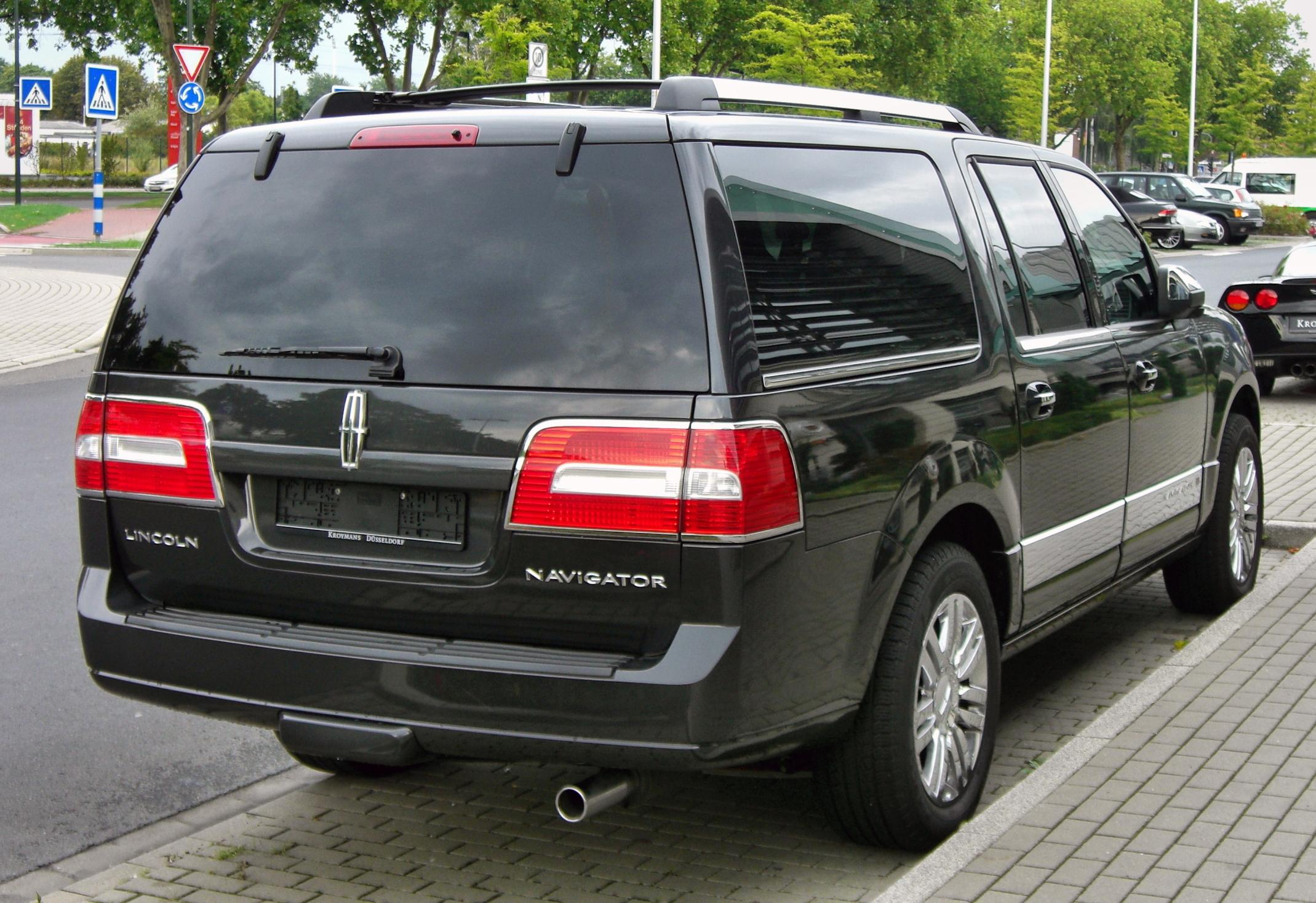
2007–2014 Lincoln Navigator L (LWB model)

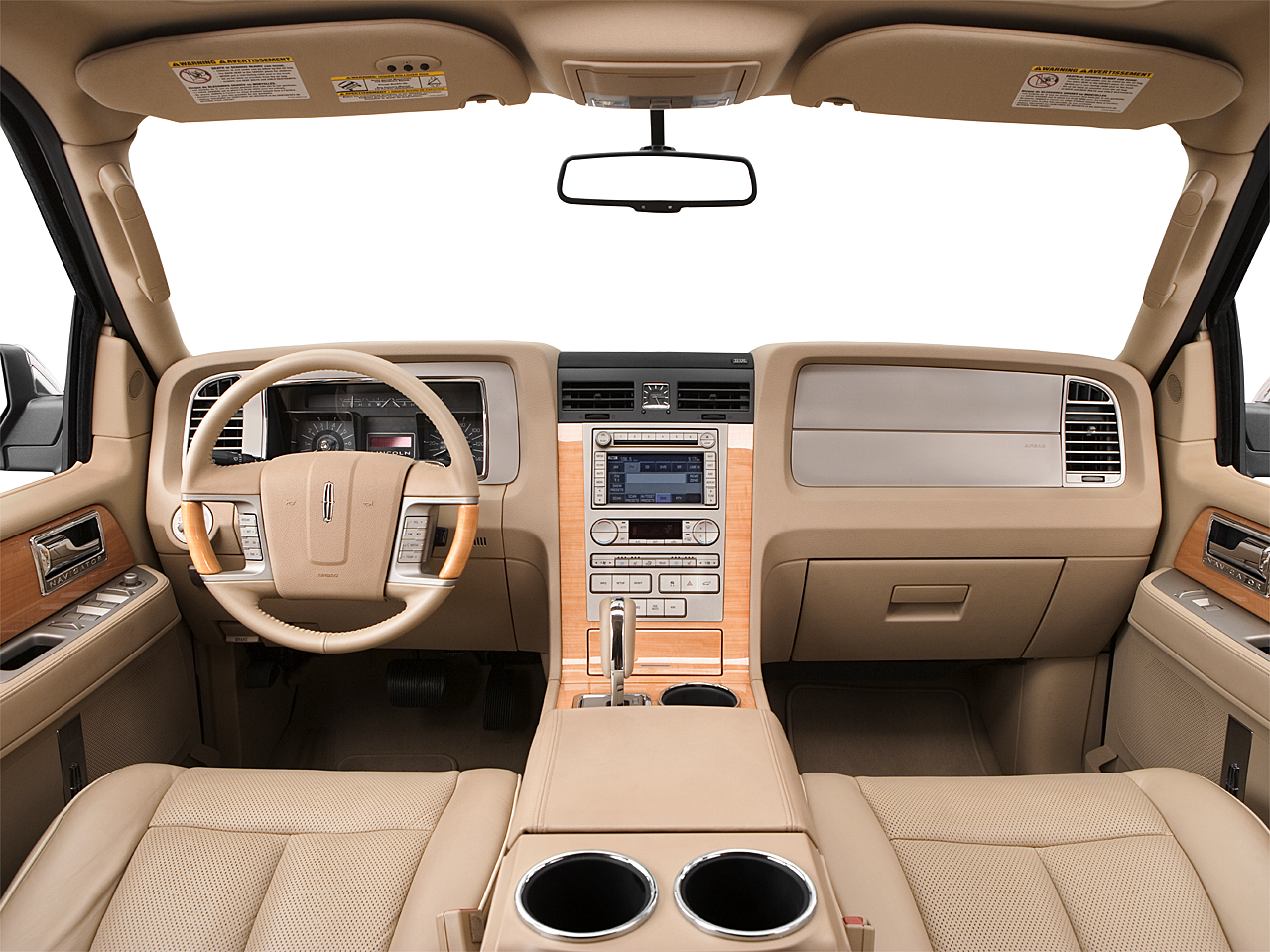
Dashboard of a 2007 Lincoln Navigator

=== 2015 refresh ===
In March 2013, Ford had confirmed reports that the next generation Lincoln Navigator would not be a repackaged Ford Expedition as the previous generations were, despite trailing the MKX in terms of sales but ahead of the MKT, but hopes to make it more competitive in the luxury SUV segment as they prepared to take on the Cadillac Escalade, Infiniti QX80, and the Mercedes-Benz GL-Class, each of which had already or would launch new generations in 2013 or 2014, and would be designed by the new Lincoln design team that also designed the new 2013 MKZ. It would be completely new and would feature the 3.5-liter Ecoboost, interior and exterior and performance upgrades. But in May 2013 a prototype Navigator with a different front grille was tested featuring the EcoBoost in preparation for the updated Navigator, which was followed by more spy shots taken in September 2013 that was sporting Lincoln's updated signature front grille.

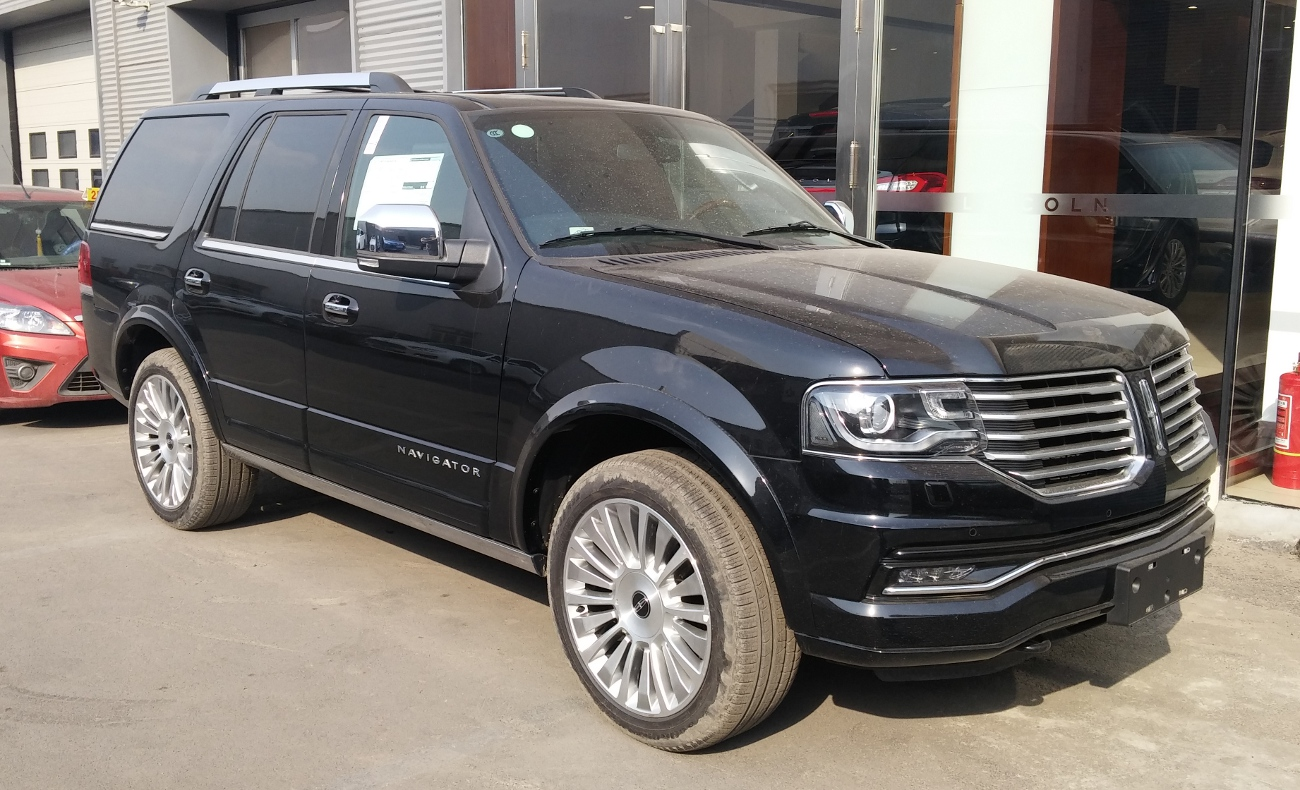
Lincoln Navigator (refreshed)

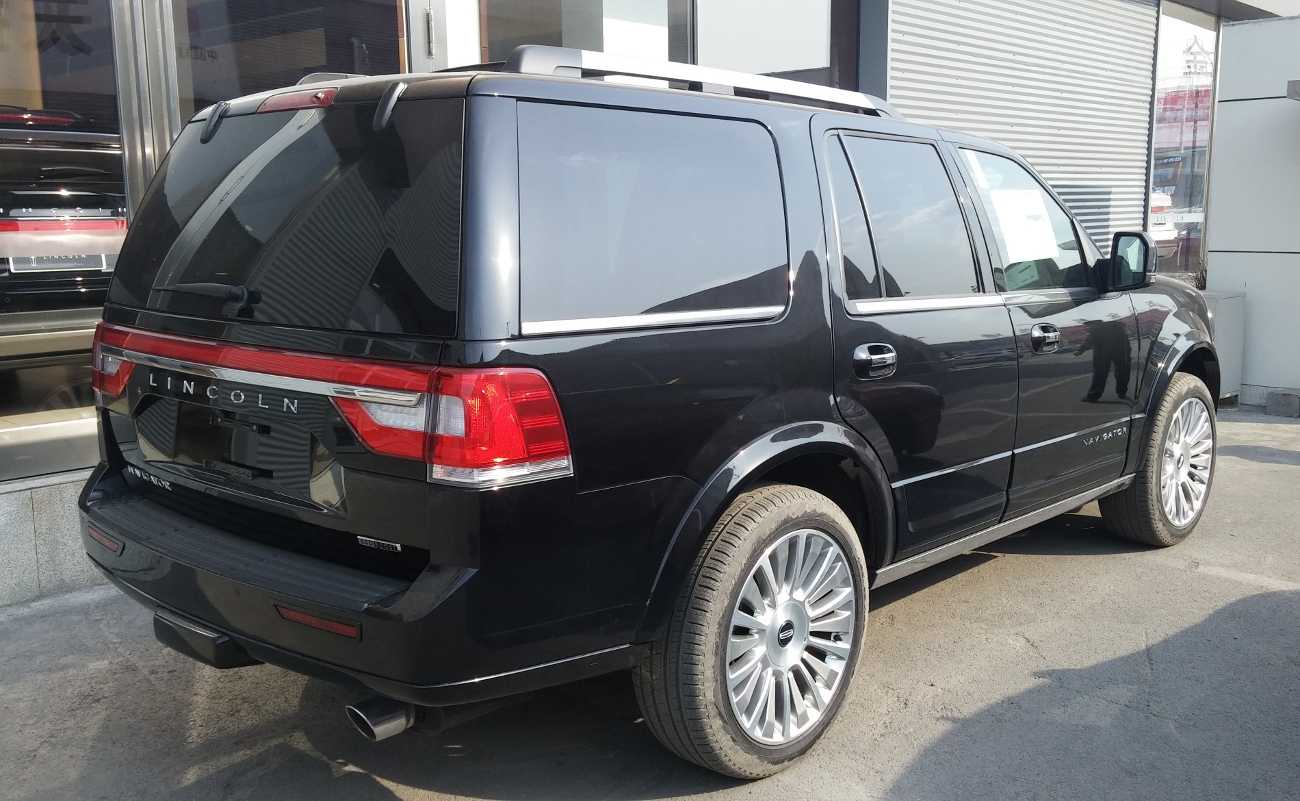
Rear view

On January 22, 2014, three photos of the 2015 Navigator were released on Twitter and Instagram, along with an announcement that the refreshed SUV would be revealed at the Washington Auto Show the following day (January 23, 2014). However, hours after the leaks were made public, Lincoln held a press event in Detroit for the vehicle and revealed the updated Navigator earlier than expected.

The 2015 Navigator and Navigator L kept the same exterior styling design as the Expedition instead of the reported repackaging that was announced earlier by Ford. However, it now featured an updated front grille with the rear tailgate lights bearing a resemblance to the Dodge Durango. The EcoBoost V6 was the only engine offered for the 2015 model year, making 380 hp (283 kW; 385 PS) and 460 lb⋅ft (624 N⋅m) of torque. The exterior included HID headlamps with LED running lights and full LED taillights. Twenty-inch wheels came standard, replacing the 18-inch wheels, while a reserve package featured 22-inch wheels. The dashboard panels features MyLincoln Touch with Sync as standard, controlled through an eight-inch touchscreen display in the dash, and home to twin 4.2-inch displays that flank a central speedometer, falling in line with the rest of the Lincoln models. The push-button start became standard, likewise a passive entry and a rear-view camera. Blind-spot monitoring was added as an optional feature.

Both the updated Navigator and Navigator L went into production in the middle of 2014, and arrived to dealers in late 2014 as a 2015 model.

=== Safety ===
2016 Lincoln Navigator SUV 4x4 NHTSA
Overall:	5/5 stars
Frontal Driver:	5/5 stars
Frontal Passenger:	5/5 stars
Side Driver:	5/5 stars
Side Passenger:	5/5 stars
Side Pole Driver:	5/5 stars
Rollover AWD:	19.8%
Rollover RWD:	21.2%

== Fourth generation (2018) ==
Fourth generation
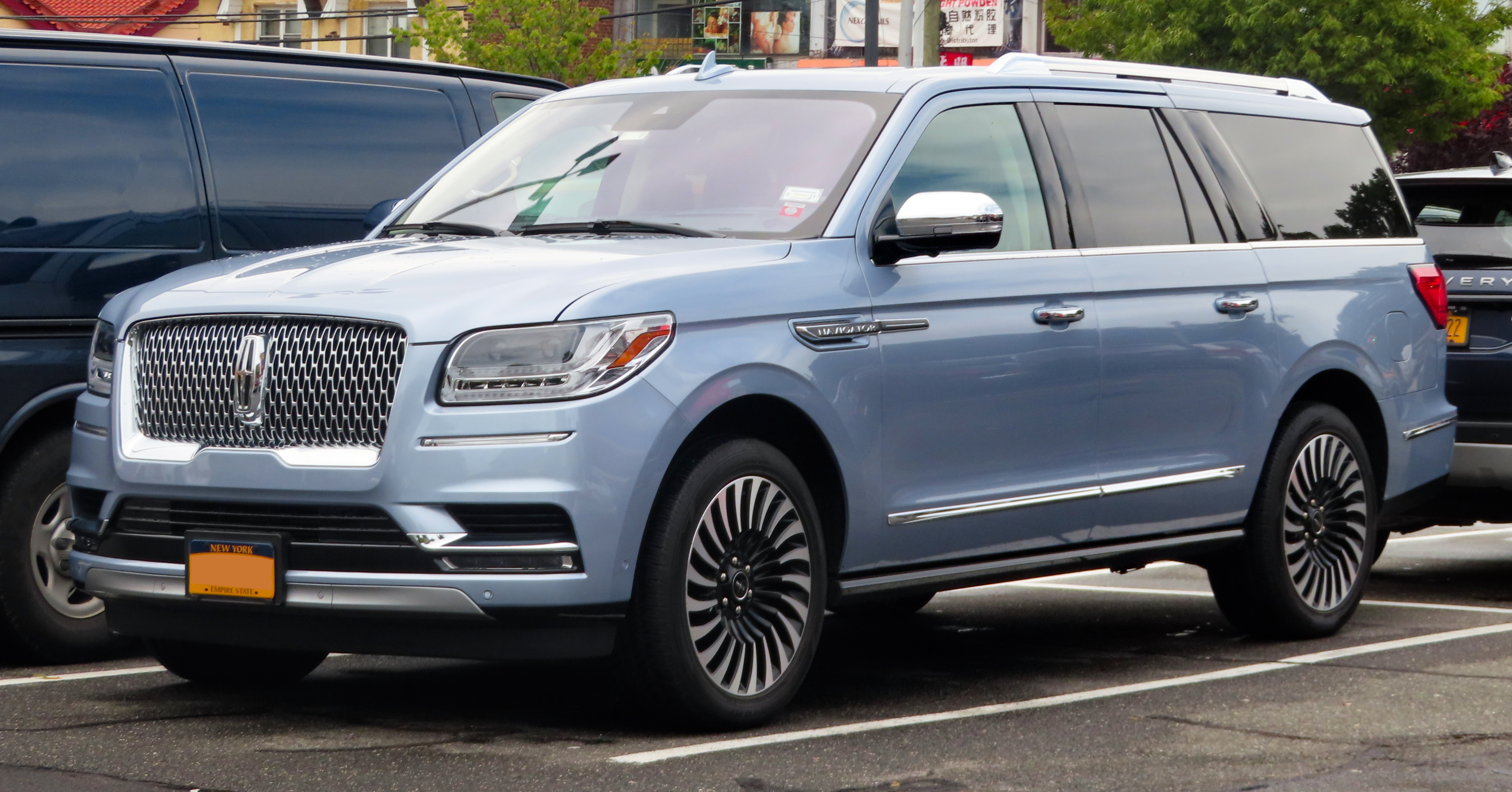

Overview
- Model code: U554
- Also called: Lincoln Navigator L Lincoln Navigator L Limousine (with conversion)
- Production: September 2017 – 2024
- Model years: 2018–2024
- Assembly: Louisville, Kentucky, U.S. (Kentucky Truck Assembly)
- Designer: Earl Lucas, Jaewoo Chang

Body and chassis
- Platform: Ford T3 platform

Powertrain
- Engine: 3.5 L EcoBoost D35 twin-turbo V6
- Transmission: 10-speed 10R80 SelectShift automatic

Dimensions
- Wheelbase: 122.5 in (3,112 mm); 131.6 in (3,343 mm) (L)
- Length: 210.0 in (5,334 mm); 221.9 in (5,636 mm) (L)
- Width: 79.9 in (2,029 mm)
- Height: 78.3 in (1,989 mm)
- Curb weight: 5,685–5,855 lb (2,579–2,656 kg); 5,926–6,056 lb (2,688–2,747 kg) (L)

On April 12, 2017, the fourth-generation 2018 Lincoln Navigator was introduced at the 2017 New York Auto Show. As with previous generations, the fourth-generation remains the Lincoln counterpart of the Ford Expedition, offered in both a standard and long-wheelbase configuration (Lincoln Navigator L). As before, both two and four-wheel drive versions are offered.

The fourth-generation marked a significant shift in the exterior styling of the Navigator, as it adopted styling features of the 2017 Lincoln Continental. In another major shift, the model line adopted aluminum body construction.

Lincoln refreshed the Navigator for the 2022 model year which was unveiled in August 2021. This added certain features such as a larger 13-inch center touchscreen along with BlueCruise, a semiautonomous driver assist system.

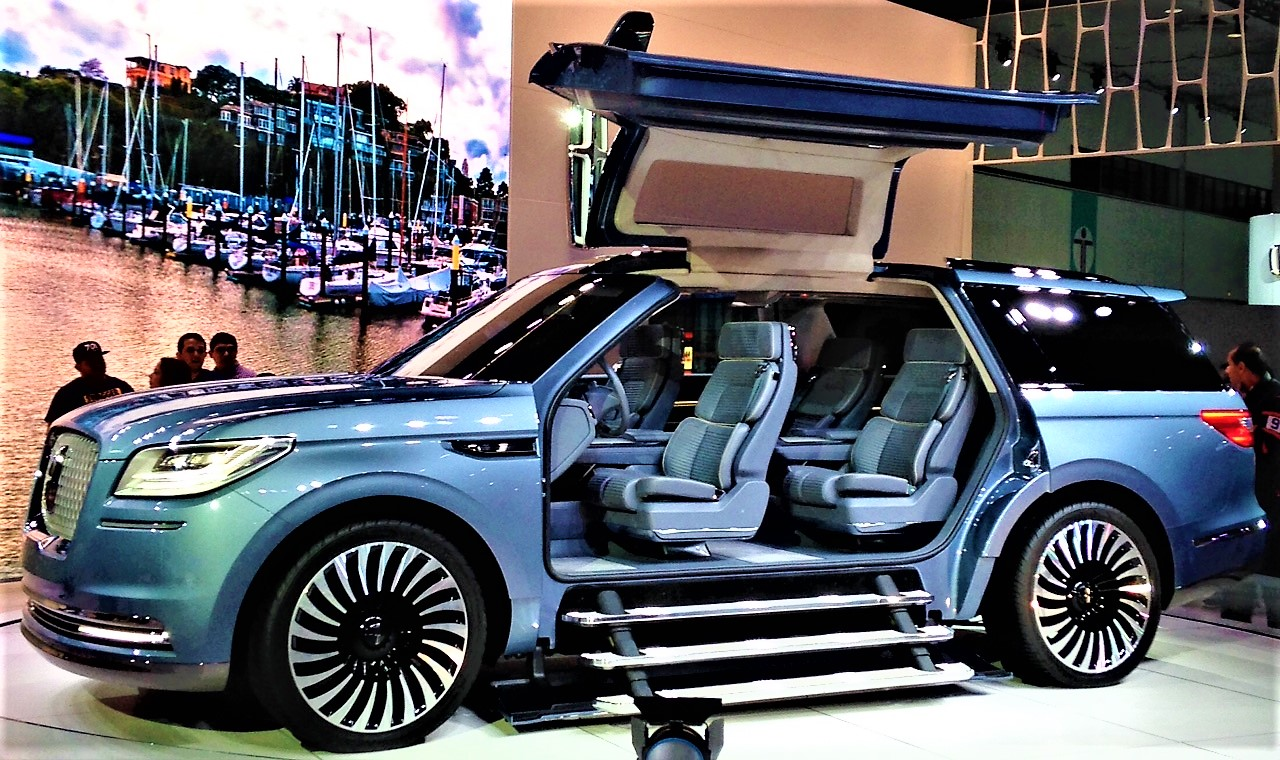
Lincoln Navigator Concept at the 2016 LA Auto Show

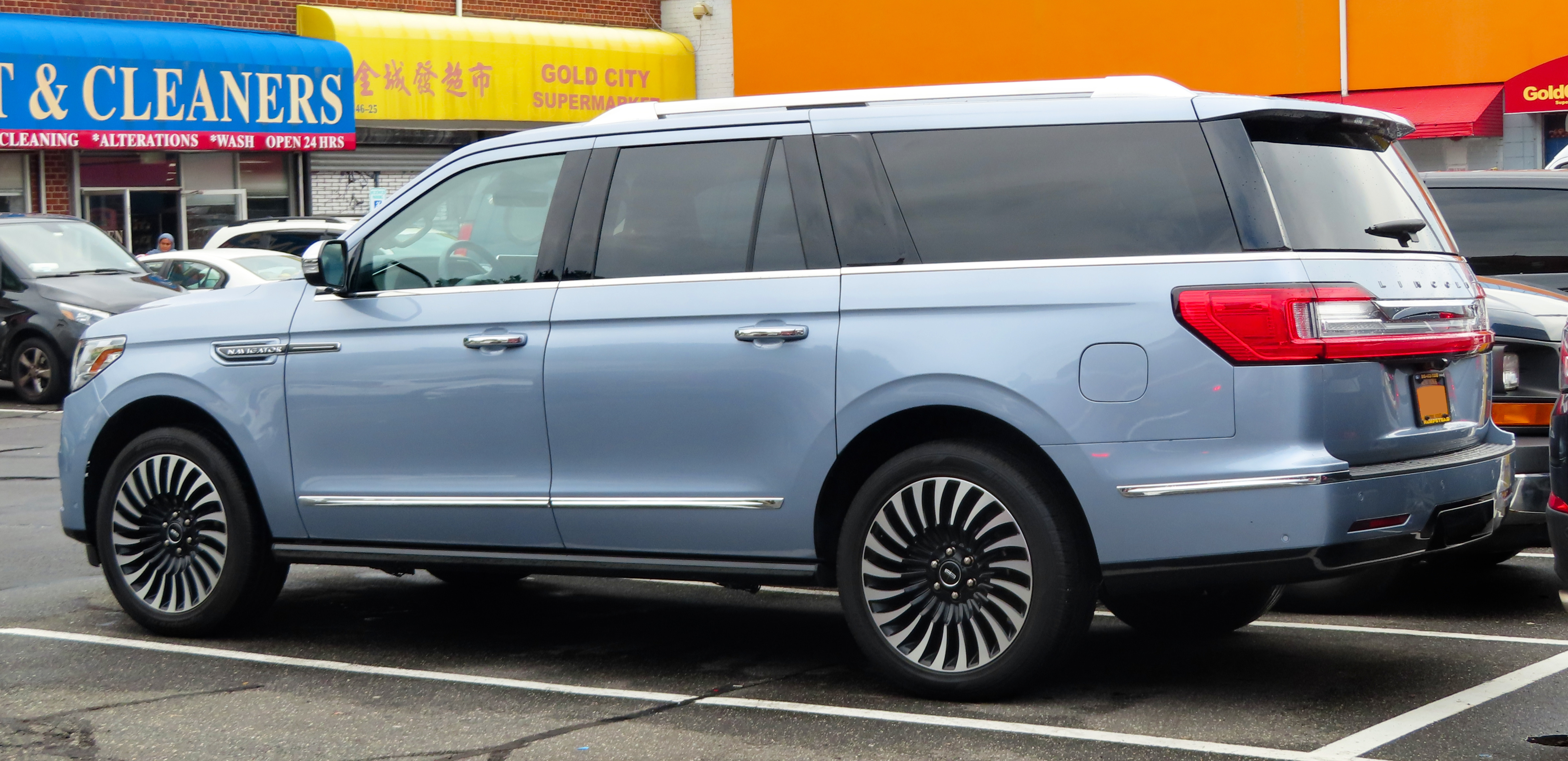
2019 Lincoln Navigator L

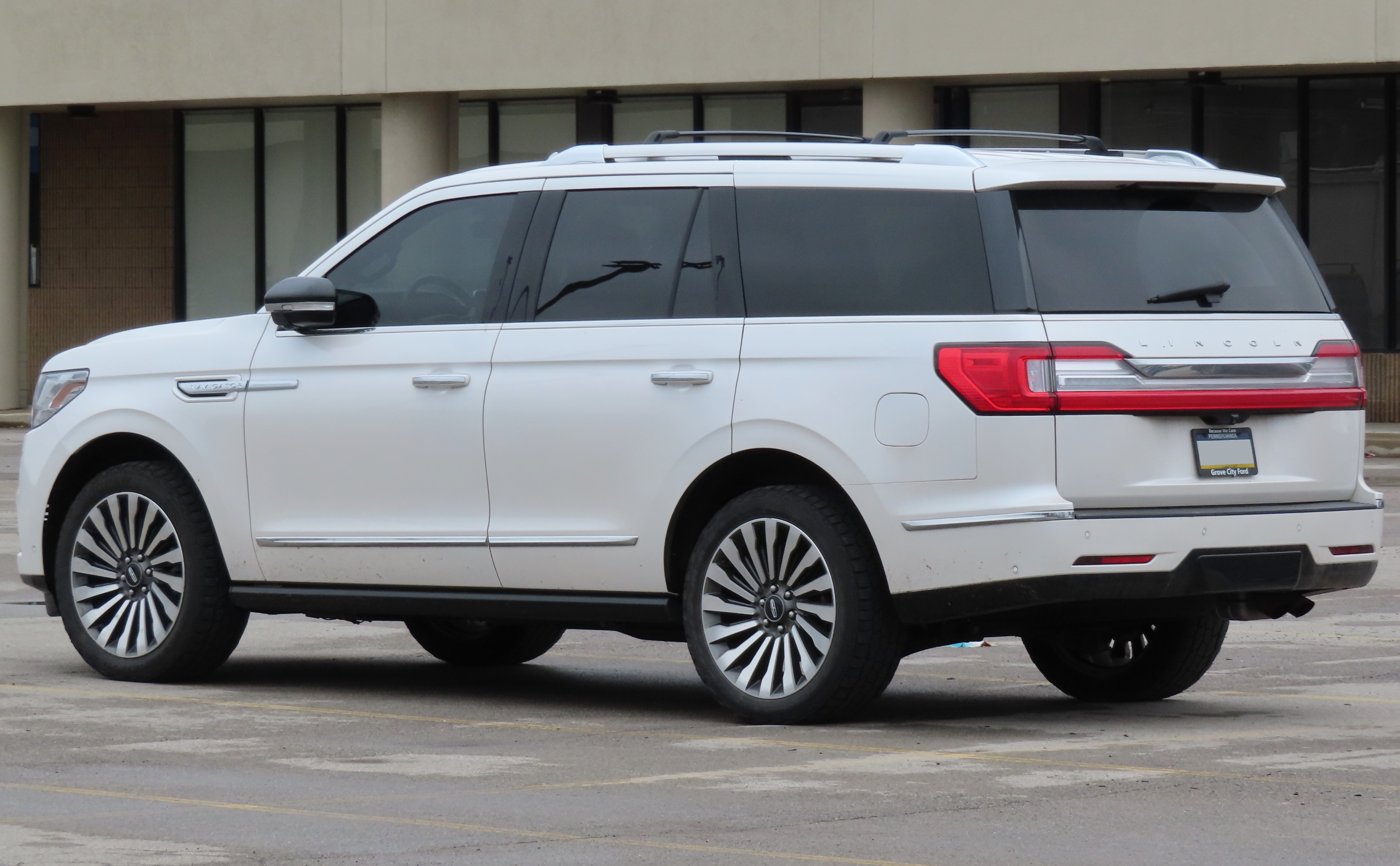
2018 Lincoln Navigator

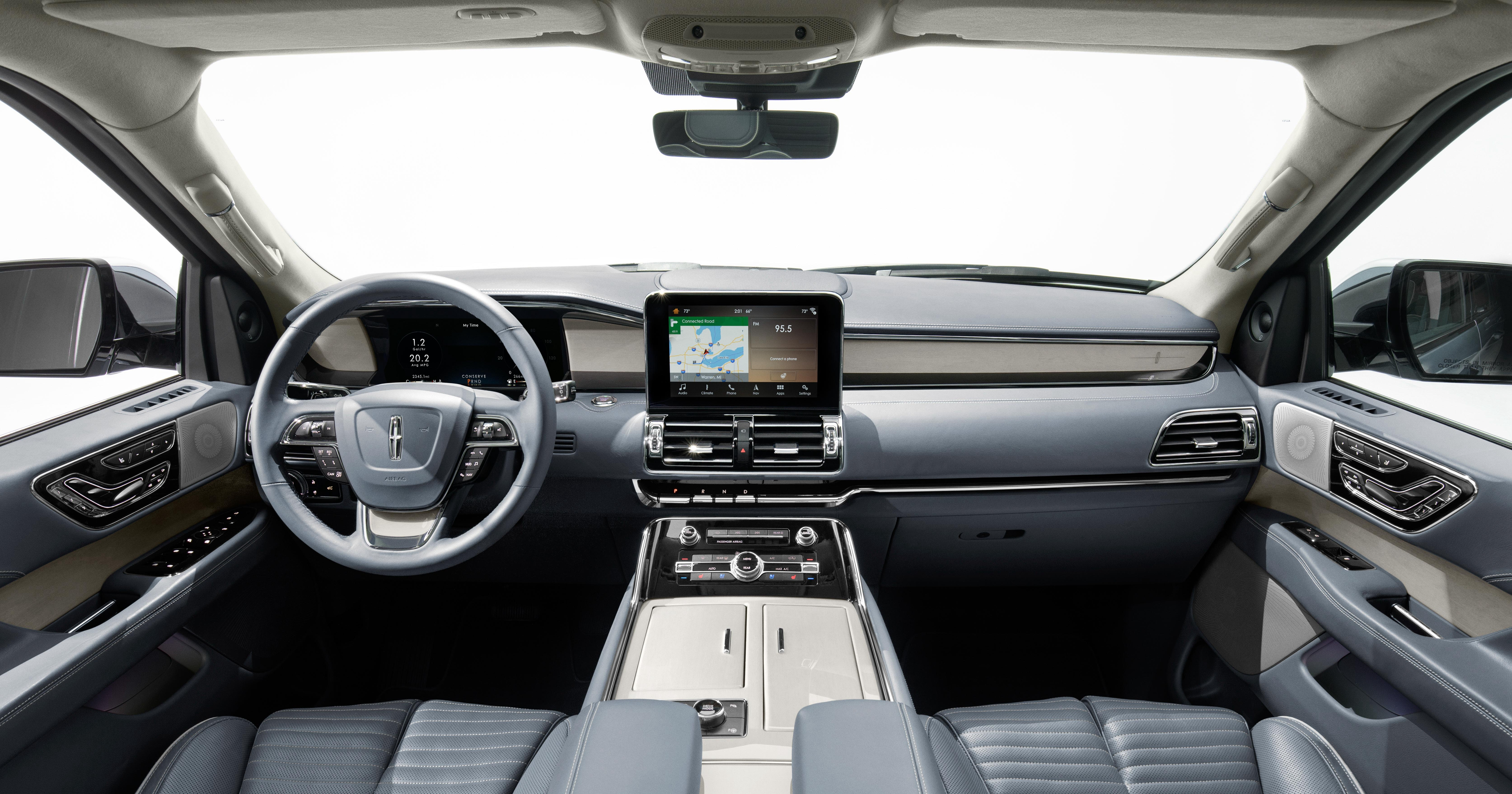
2018–21 Lincoln Navigator Black Label Interior

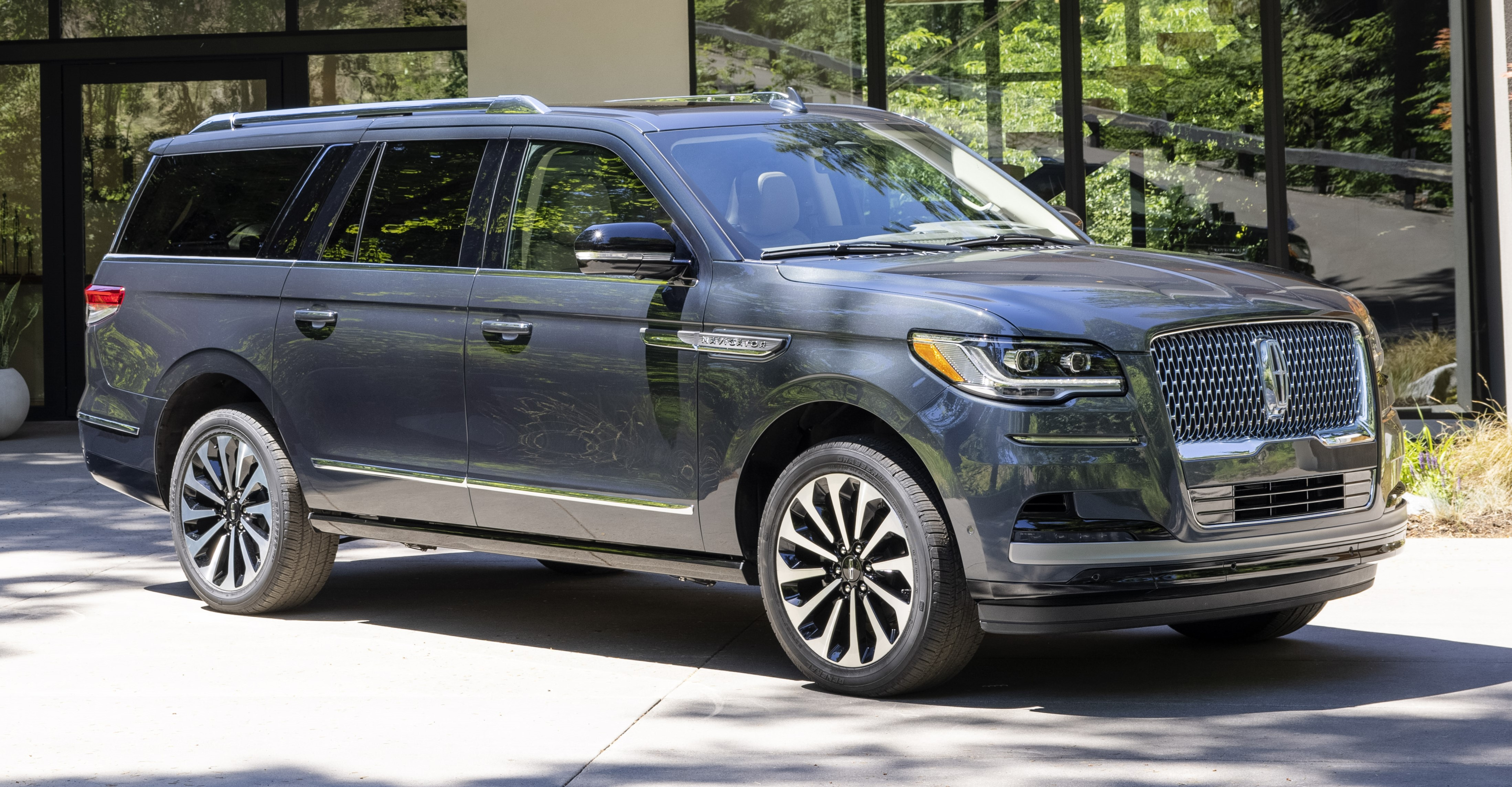
2022 Lincoln Navigator L (facelifted)

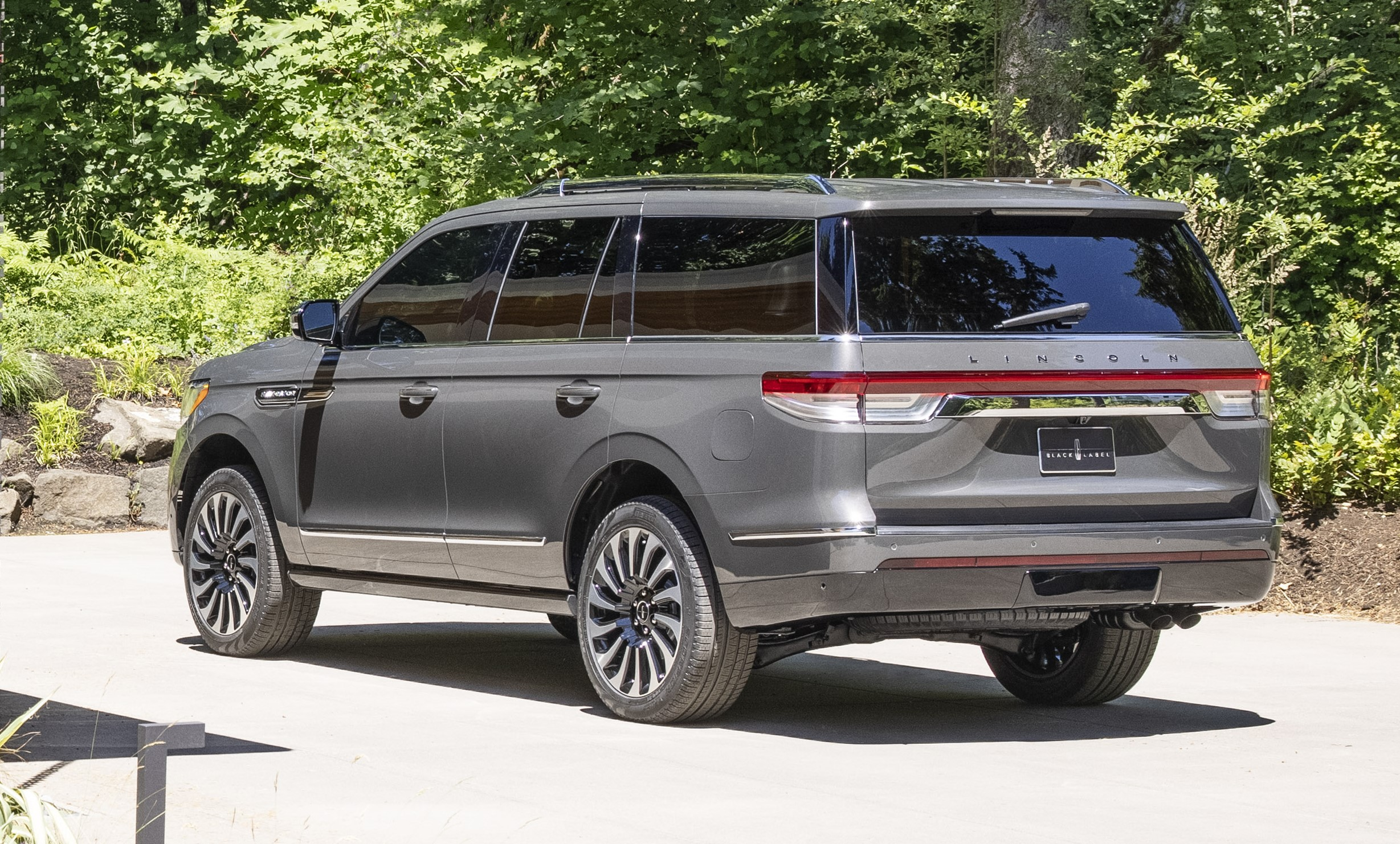
2022 Lincoln Navigator L (rear view)

=== Chassis ===
The fourth-generation Lincoln Navigator uses the Ford T3 platform, developed under the U554 code name. Retaining body-on-frame construction, the Lincoln Navigator (and Ford Expedition) were engineered alongside the 2015 Ford F-150. The four-wheel independent suspension configuration was retained, with a redesigned rear suspension layout.

Shared with the Ford F-150 Raptor, the Lincoln Navigator is equipped with a 450 hp (336 kW; 456 PS) twin-turbocharged 3.5L EcoBoost V6 (although Lincoln has ended its use of the EcoBoost nomenclature). The highest-output engine ever sold by Lincoln, the 3.5-liter V6 is paired with a 10-speed automatic transmission (replacing the previous 6-speed automatic).

=== Body ===
Entering production with only minor differences from the Lincoln Navigator concept vehicle shown at the 2016 New York Auto Show (no inclusion of the gullwing doors and stair-style running boards, used largely for display purposes). The 2018 Lincoln Navigator adopted several design features from the 2017 Lincoln Continental, including the style of its headlights, taillights, side vents, and its front fascia, with a large rectangular grille and a centered Lincoln star emblem. While sharing its roofline and side doors with the Ford Expedition, in the style of Range Rovers, the B, C, and D-pillars are blacked out for a "floating roof" effect.

As with the 2015 Ford F-150, the body of fourth-generation Lincoln Navigator (and Ford Expedition) was designed as a part of a shift to aluminum body construction, with the use of steel largely reserved for the chassis frame rails. Nearly 200 pounds (91 kg) lighter than the previous generation, the fourth-generation Navigator is physically larger than its predecessor, with the standard-wheelbase configuration gaining three inches in wheelbase, while the long-wheelbase L gaining nearly an inch (becoming the longest-wheelbase Lincoln ever produced excluding the Mark LT pickup). In terms of body length, both versions were shortened approximately half an inch.

Shared with the Lincoln Continental, the dashboard of the 2018 Lincoln Navigator replaced a conventional console (or column)-mounted shifter with dashboard-mounted buttons and paddle shifters. In the late 1950s, the Ford Motor company offered mechanical transmission gear selection featured on all 1957 and 1958 Mercury sedans called Multi-Drive which offered a similar approach. For the first time in the model line, the fourth-generation Navigator offers a head-up display along with a 12-inch reconfigurable instrument cluster.

=== Trim ===
The fourth-generation Lincoln Navigator continues the same trim line introduced in the 2015 model update, with Premiere (new to the Navigator for 2018) as the standard trim, Select as the mid-level trim, and Reserve as the highest trim level. Each is powered by a turbocharged 3.5-liter V6 with an output of 450 hp (340 kW; 460 PS) and 510 lb⋅ft (691 N⋅m) of torque and comes with a 10-speed automatic transmission. 4WD models are equipped with a 2-speed BorgWarner 4417 transfer case with a low-range gear ratio of 2.64:1.

In addition to other trim changes for the fourth generation, the Black Label series became available for the first time on the Navigator. A series of vehicles with interiors and exteriors coordinated around a theme (similar to the Designer Series Lincolns and Continentals of the 1970s and 1980s), the Navigator was sold during this generation with five Black Label themes: Chalet, Destination, Invitation, Central Park and Yacht Club.

At a base price of approximately $95,000, the Black Label edition of the Lincoln Navigator is the most expensive vehicle ever sold by Ford Motor Company (with the exception of the Ford GT).

=== Safety ===
NHTSA crash test ratings (2020):

- Front Impact Rating:
- Side Impact Rating:
- Rollover Rating (AWD):
- Rollover Rating (RWD):

== Fifth generation (2025) ==
Fifth generation
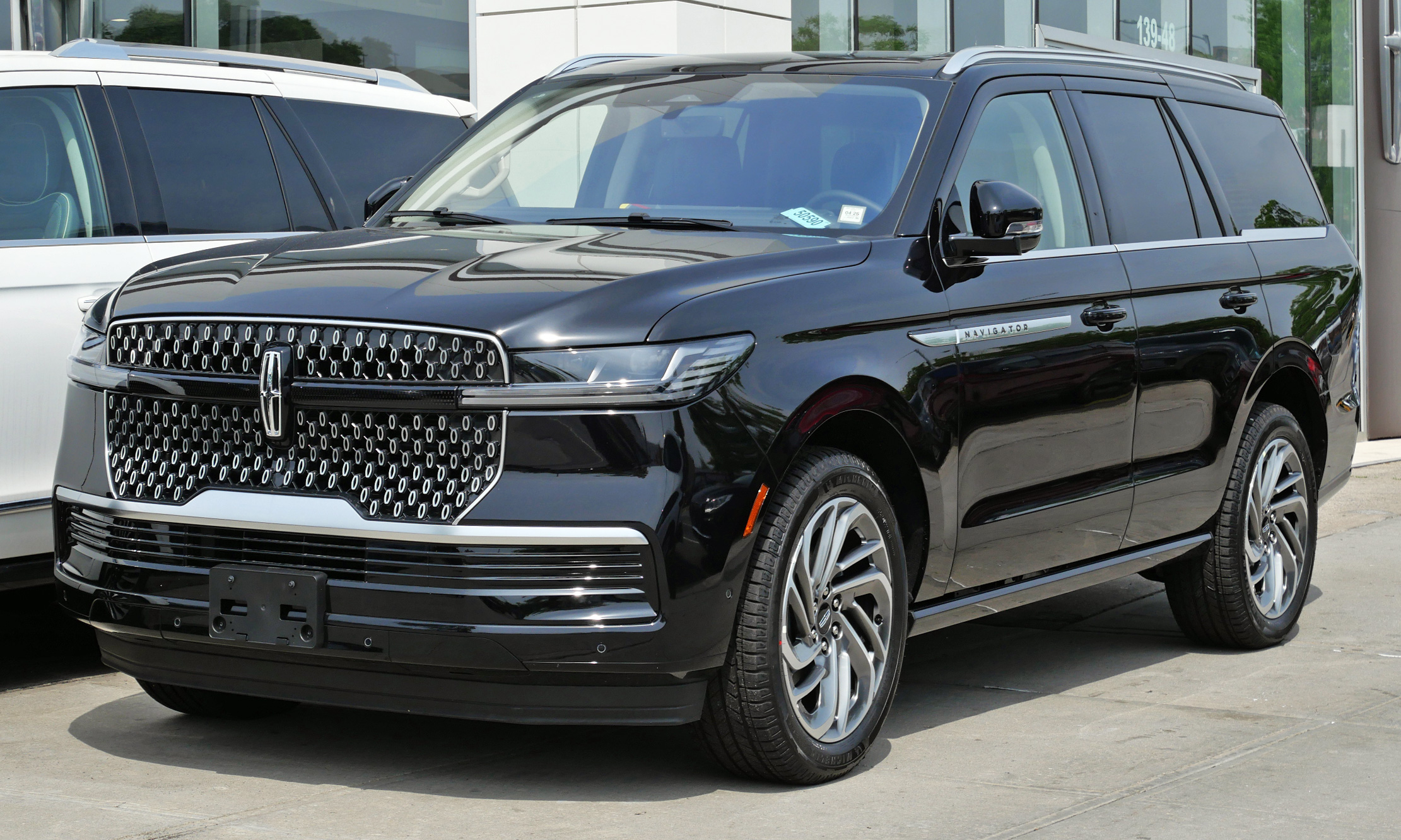

Overview
- Model code: U718
- Also called: Lincoln Navigator L
- Production: January 2025 – present
- Model years: 2025–present
- Assembly: Louisville, Kentucky, U.S. (Kentucky Truck Assembly)

Body and chassis
- Platform: Ford T3 platform

Powertrain
- Engine: 3.5 L EcoBoost D35 twin-turbo V6
- Transmission: 10-speed 10R80 SelectShift automatic

Dimensions
- Wheelbase: 122.5 in (3,112 mm); 131.5 in (3,340 mm) (L)
- Length: 210.0 in (5,334 mm); 221.9 in (5,636 mm) (L)
- Width: 79.9 in (2,029 mm)
- Height: 78 in (1,981 mm)
- Curb weight: 5,929 lb (2,689 kg); 6,044 lb (2,742 kg) (L)

The fifth generation Navigator was revealed on August 15, 2024, with sales set to commence in the first half of 2025.

The Navigator shares a similar design for the front and rear fascias from the Aviator and Nautilus. It has an illuminated light bar on the grille upfront and a full-width LED taillights on the rear. The lights feature Lincoln Embrace welcoming sequence upon vehicle approach. For the first time, the Navigator is available with 24-inch alloy wheels.

The interior features Lincoln Digital Experience user interface with a 48-inch full-width display spanning across the top of the dashboard with Google built-in. There is a 11.1-inch touchscreen used as the control panel. Other interior features include a 28-speaker Revel Ultima 3D Audio System, Lincoln Digital Scent, Lincoln Rejuvenate and Second-Row Power Tailored Seats with massage option.

The independent rear glass opening feature has been ditched for a Split Gate, with the Open on Approach feature. It is also available with a Cargo Tailgate Manager which can be positioned as a bench seatback or a dining table. Another first for the Navigator is power folding third row seats which fold 40/20/40.

For safety, Lincoln BlueCruise hands-free advanced safety assistance system (ADAS) is standard on the Navigator. Other driving assistance features new for the Navigator are Turn Signal View and Intersection Assist.

All models come with a twin-turbocharged 3.5-liter EcoBoost V6 gasoline carried over from the previous model, standard four-wheel drive and adaptive suspension with continuously controlled dampering.

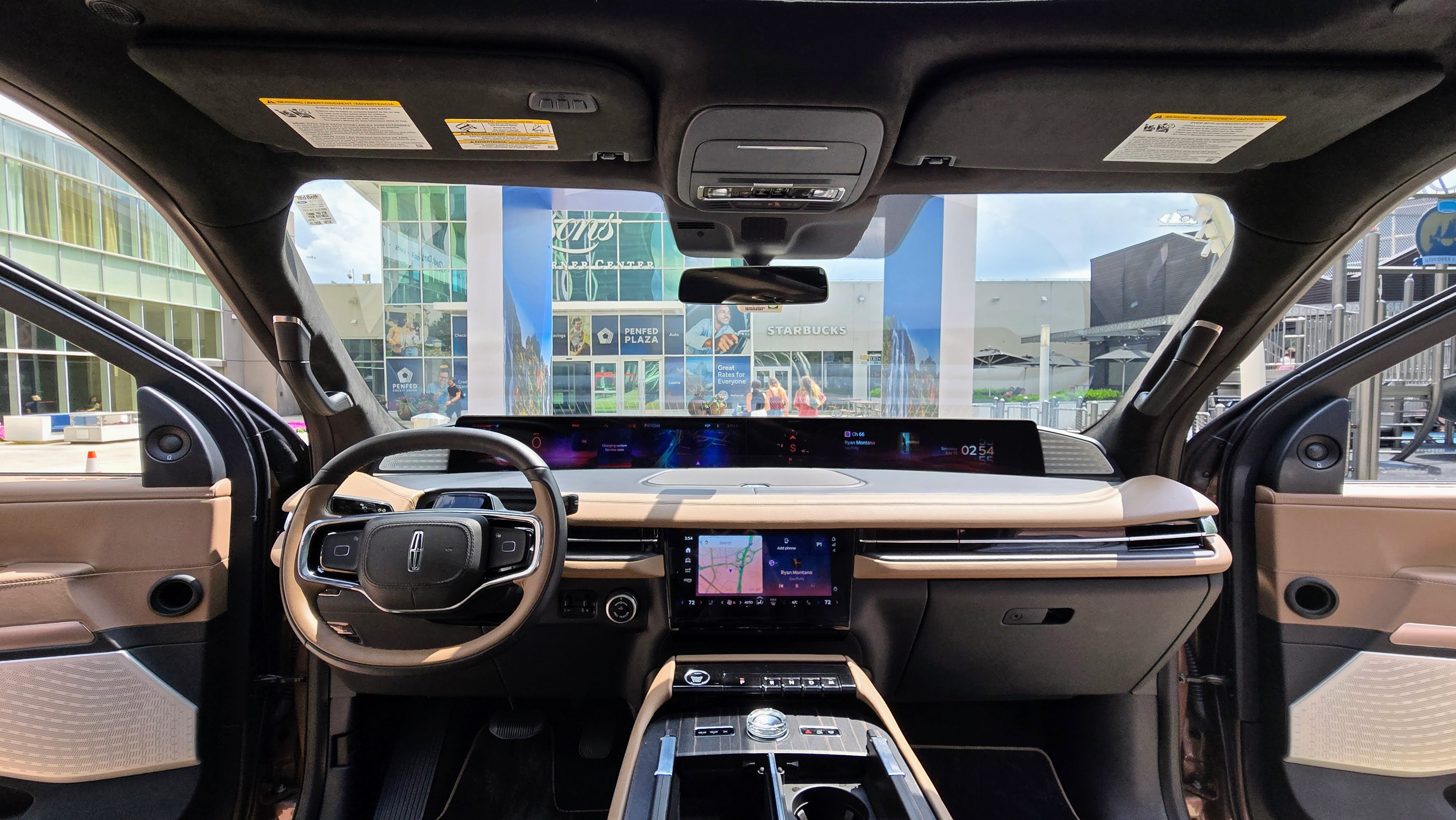
Dashboard of a 2025 Lincoln Navigator

== Awards ==
- On January 14, 2018, The Lincoln Navigator was awarded Truck of the Year at the 2018 North American International Auto Show, marking the first time that a Lincoln vehicle has been given a NAIAS award, as well as the first American-built Luxury Sport Utility Vehicle in this segment to win in this category.
- 2024 Best CPO (Certified Pre-Owned) Value in America Award from Vincentric in the Large Luxury SUV segment for that reason and several others, joining its platform mate – the Ford Expedition – which took home top honors in the Large SUV segment.

== Recalls ==
=== 2026 recall ===
In June 2026 Ford issued a recall order of over 741,000 vehicles, including the Navigator, in the U.S. due to a transmission issue that may damage the park system.

== Sales ==
Calendar year	United States	Canada	China
1997	26,834	—N/a	—N/a
1998	43,859	—N/a	—N/a
1999	39,250	—N/a	—N/a
2000	37,923	—N/a	—N/a
2001	31,759	—N/a	—N/a
2002	30,613	—N/a	—N/a
2003	38,742	—N/a	—N/a
2004	36,398	—N/a	—N/a
2005	25,844	1,025	—N/a
2006	23,947	968	—N/a
2007	24,050	961	—N/a
2008	14,836	384	—N/a
2009	8,057	414	—N/a
2010	8,245	544	—N/a
2011	8,018	609	—N/a
2012	8,371	546	—N/a
2013	8,613	295	—N/a
2014	10,433	328	—N/a
2015	11,964	550	272
2016	10,421	557	731
2017	10,523	652	1,401
2018	17,839	1,177	2,588
2019	18,656	1,644	3,417
2020	15,252	1,209	
2021	15,631	1,311	3,576
2022	13,206		8,172
2023	17,549		1,329
2024	15,531	978	704
2025	22,185		351
