= Louisville (magazine) =

Louisville Magazine
- Categories: Culture
- Frequency: Monthly
- First issue: March 1950
- Company: Louisville Magazine, Inc
- Country: United States
- Based in: Louisville, Kentucky
- Language: English
- Website: www.louisville.com
- ISSN: 0024-6948

Louisville Magazine is distributed in the Louisville area. It covers local business and culture.

== History ==
Founded in March 1950 by the Louisville Chamber of Commerce to replace the Board of Trade Journal. The magazine was printed quarterly and its subscribers consisted of mainly Chamber of Commerce members as a part of membership dues. The magazine would become a monthly magazine in 1952. In the early issues of the magazine it consisted of mainly economy topics. However, from 1951 to 1970 the magazine grew to include community topics and better graphics due to Helen G. Henry. During her tenure with the magazine it received 45 awards from the American Association of Committee Publications.

In January 1971 the magazine ventured into color and increased its circulation. In this new version of the magazine it was planned to be used as a promotional tool for the city. This project was brought on from the Louisville Development Committee. The magazine then joined the Audit Bureau of Circulations (ABC) in 1984 to help boost its advertising and circulation. The magazine also introduced a section for a local television station.

In 1993 the Chamber of Commerce sold the magazine to Dan Crutcher who became the publisher and editor. As a part of the new ownership the television station pages were dropped. The company making the magazine is now known as Louisville Magazine, Inc, and is independent from the city.

In 2018, Louisville Magazine was sold to Matthew Barzun.
