= Kentucky Truck Assembly =

Ford Motor Company manufacturing plant

Kentucky Truck Assembly Plant
- Operated: 1969–present
- Location: 3245 Chamberlain Lane; Louisville, Kentucky, United States
- Coordinates: 38.293944°N 85.531761°W
- Industry: Automotive
- Products: SUVs and pickup trucks
- Employees: 9,201 (2024)
- Area: 500 acres (2.0 km^{2})
- Owner: Ford Motor Company
- Website: corporate.ford.com/operations/locations/global-plants/kentucky-truck-plant.html

Kentucky Truck Plant is an automobile manufacturing plant owned by Ford Motor Company in Louisville, Kentucky. Opened in 1969, the 4,626,490-square-foot (429,815 m^{2}) plant on 500 acres (2.0 km^{2}) currently employs 8,500 people total. The hourly production workers are represented by The United Automobile, Aerospace, and Agricultural Implement Workers of America, better known as the United Auto Workers (UAW) Local 862, It is located at 3001 Chamberlain Lane in the Northeast corner of the city. Ford also operates another plant in Louisville, the Louisville Assembly Plant.

== Production ==
The plant houses approximately 30 miles (48 km) of conveyor belts. Recent expansion has almost doubled the floor area (to include a new paint facility, new body shop for aluminum chassis' in 2016, a new stacker, and a new tire production facility) and the final size is yet to be completed. Vehicle output average is 88 vehicles per hour between two assembly lines.

The F-250 to F-550 Ford Super Duty line of trucks is currently built here. At one time, medium and heavy trucks (semis) and over the road haulers were built here, including the Ford L-Series trucks, which were named for Louisville.

The Kentucky Truck Assembly Plant also manufactures the Ford Expedition (both regular and EL/Max larger models) and Lincoln Navigator (both regular and L versions) alongside the F250, 350, 450 and 550. This additional production began in January 2009.

In October 2025, Ford purchased more than 65 acres of land for over $41 million. The site is adjacent to their existing Kentucky Truck Plant, and likely to be used for future expansion. In June 2026, Gov. Beshear said the state supported Ford's potential $2 billion expansion at its Kentucky Truck Plant, and approved a financial incentive boost.

In September 2026, Ford announced a $1 billion investment to replace the plant's existing paint shop. Construction was expected to begin later that year.

== Current products ==
- Ford Super Duty (1998–present)
- Ford Expedition & Expedition EL/Max (2009–present)
- Lincoln Navigator & Navigator L (2009–present)

=== Past ===
- Ford Excursion (2000–2005)
- Ford B series
- Ford C series
- Ford W series
- Ford CL series
- Ford Cargo
- Ford L series/Louisville/Aeromax

== See also ==
- List of major employers in Louisville, Kentucky
