= Greater Louisville Inc. =

One Louisville, formerly Greater Louisville Inc. (GLI) and the Louisville Area Chamber of Commerce, is an organization that promotes the growth of businesses in Louisville, Kentucky. In 2026, GLI merged with the Louisville Economic Development Alliance and rebranded as One Louisville.

== History ==
In 1862, 220 firms paid $1 each to join the Louisville Board of Trade. Prior to that, there was a Merchants Exchange that met monthly during the 1850s on the southeast corner of Second and Main.

The lineage of Greater Louisville Inc. began in 1943, when Louisville mayor Wilson W. Wyatt formed the Louisville Area Development Association. By 1950, this and other local business groups united and incorporated into the Louisville Chamber of Commerce. It was renamed Louisville Area Chamber of Commerce, and was one of the first such groups accredited by the United States Chamber of Commerce.

Dr. Kenneth Vinsel was named the first Chief Executive Officer of The Chamber. The first issue of Louisville magazine was unveiled on March 1, 1950. The offices were located on Fifth Street, between Jefferson and Liberty. In 1951, The Chamber moved to the Courier-Journal and Louisville Times Building at 300 West Liberty. The Chamber also played a key role in attracting General Electric to Louisville.

The Louisville Development Committee was launched in 1971 to promote Louisville nationally, using direct mailings of Louisville magazine, published by the Chamber. The chamber also revitalized the Kentucky Derby Festival in the 1970s by providing car pooling and business support services.

In the 1990s, the chamber moved to the Commerce Center at 600 W. Main and sold Louisville magazine. In 1997 the Louisville Area Chamber of Commerce merged with the Greater Louisville Economic Development Partnership, which had been founded in 1987, and in January 1998 the board voted to rename the chamber as Greater Louisville Inc. In 1978, Leadership Louisville was launched at The Chamber. This program, designed to broaden the horizons of local leaders, continues to grow and now operates out of separate offices.

In early 1998, GLI became a strategic economic development partner with Metro Louisville Government, leading business attraction and expansion responsibilities for the Louisville area. Also in 1998, GLI launched EnterpriseCorp to assist fast-growth, entrepreneurial companies, and launched a new Workforce initiative to retain and recruit qualified workers for the region.

GLI moved into its current headquarters building at 101 S. Fifth Street, Suite 2300, in Downtown Louisville in 2023. In 2009, GLI launched the Greater Louisville Internationals Professionals (G.L.I.P.) program to attract and retain international talent in our community. The first of its kind in the nation, the program creates networking, professional development, mentoring, and attraction opportunities for international professionals across the region.

In early 2015, Greater Louisville Inc. partnered with surrounding economic development organizations in Kentucky and Southern Indiana to form Advance Greater Louisville, the Regional Economic Development Partnership, which accelerates regional economic growth and raises awareness of the community both nationally and internationally. The Advance Greater Louisville partnership represents all counties in the Louisville metropolitan area.

In late 2025, following the departure of GLI CEO Sarah Davasher-Wisdom, GLI's board approached Louisville Mayor Craig Greenberg to explore combining GLI with the Louisville Economic Development Alliance (LEDA), which served as the official economic development organization for Louisville-Jefferson County. GLI's board voted to approve the merger on February 23, 2026, and LEDA's board voted to approve on February 25, 2026. The new, combined organization, named One Louisville, became effective March 1, 2026. One Louisville is now the official regional chamber of commerce and economic development organization for the Louisville, Kentucky region.

== President/CEO ==
- K. P. Vinsel (1950–1966), former University of Louisville professor
- Charles F. Herd (1966–1983), previously headed Knoxville's Chamber of Commerce
- James O. Robertson (1983–1991), economic development expert
- Robert H. Gayle (1991–1996)
- Douglass Cobb (1996–1997)
- Steven Higdon (2000–2005)
- Joe Reagan (2005–2011)
- Craig Richard (2012–2014)
- Kent Oyler (2014–2020)
- Sarah Davasher-Wisdom (2020–2025)

== See also ==
- Economy of Louisville, Kentucky
