= Hurricane (disambiguation) =

A hurricane is a strong tropical cyclone from the North Atlantic and Eastern Pacific.

Hurricane may also refer to:

== Arts and entertainment ==
=== Fictional characters ===
- Hurricane (comics), several unrelated fictional characters
- Hurricane, the character of Breaux Greer in American Gladiators
- Hurricane, in TV series Black Scorpion
- Hurricane, in Thomas & Friends: Journey Beyond Sodor

=== Film ===
- Hurricane (1929 film), directed by Ralph Ince
- The Hurricane (1937 film), directed by John Ford
- Hurricane (1974 film), a made-for-TV film
- Hurricane (1979 film), starring Mia Farrow, a remake of the 1937 film; and a soundtrack album, and the title song by The Roots
- The Hurricane (1999 film), starring Denzel Washington
- Hurricane (2018 film), also known as Hurricane: 303 Squadron and Mission of Honor

=== Television ===
- Hurricanes (TV series), a British animation
- "Hurricane" (Dawson's Creek), a 1998 episode
- "Hurricane" (Quantum Leap), a 1991 episode
- "Hurricane!" (American Dad!), a 2011 episode
- "Hurricane!", an episode of Nova, 1989
- "The Hurricane!", a 2011 episode of The Cleveland Show

=== Music ===
==== People ====
- Hurricane Chris (rapper), an American rapper
- Hurricane Wisdom, an American rapper

==== Groups ====
- Hurricane (American band), a heavy metal band
- Hurricane (Serbian band), a girl group
- Hurricane #1, an English rock band
- The Hurricanes, British R&B band

==== Albums ====
- Hurricane (Eric Benét album) (2005)
- Hurricane (Nick Fradiani album) (2016)
- Hurricane (Natalie Grant album) (2013)
- Hurricane #1 (album) (1997)
- Hurricane (Grace Jones album) (2008)
- Hurricane Season (studio album) (2021)
- The Hurricane, 1997, by Agatha Christie

==== Songs ====
- "Hurricane" (Bob Dylan song) (1975)
- "Hurricane" (Bridgit Mendler song) (2012)
- "Hurricane" (Eden Golan song) (2024), the Israeli entry in the Eurovision Song Contest 2024
- "Hurricane" (Halsey song) (2014)
- "Hurricane" (I Prevail song) (2019)
- "Hurricane" (Kanye West and the Weeknd song) (2021)
- "Hurricane" (Lauren Bennett song) (2016)
- "Hurricane" (Lead song) (2011)
- "Hurricane" (Leon Everette song) (1981)
- "Hurricane" (Lifehouse song) (2015)
- "Hurricane" (Luke Combs song) (2016)
- "Hurricane" (Natalie Grant song) (2013)
- "Hurricane" (Ofenbach and Ella Henderson song) (2021)
- "Hurricane" (Rebound! song) (2010)
- "Hurricane" (The Click song) (1995)
- "Hurricane" (Thirty Seconds to Mars song) (2011)
- "Hurricane" (Thrice song) (2017)
- "Hurricane (Cradle to the Grave)", by Grace Jones (1997)
- "HURRICANE", 2022, by Aaliyah Qureishi
- "Hurricane", by Alyssa Reid from Time Bomb
- "Hurricane", by Athlete from the 2007 album Beyond the Neighbourhood
- "Hurricane", by B.A.P. from Badman EP
- "Hurricane", by Cascada from Waterfall: The Essential Dance Remix Collection
- "Hurricane", by Collective Soul from See What You Started by Continuing
- "Hurricane", by Come from Near-Life Experience
- "Hurricane", by Cover Drive from Bajan Style
- "Hurricanes", by Dido from Still on My Mind
- "Hurricane", by Faker from Addicted Romantic
- "Hurricane", by the Fray from Helios
- "Hurricane", by the Hush Sound from Goodbye Blues
- "Hurricane", by Ilse DeLange
- "Hurricane", by Infernal
- "Hurricane", by Kim Carnes from Café Racers
- "Hurricane", by Kyuss from ...And the Circus Leaves Town
- "Hurricane", by Light from Death Note: The Musical
- "Hurricane", by Martin Garrix and Sentinel
- "Hurricane'", 2011, by Middle Class Rut
- "Hurricane", by MS MR
- "Hurricane", by Natalie Imbruglia from White Lilies Island
- "Hurricane", by Needtobreathe from The Outsiders
- "Hurricane", by Panic! at the Disco from Vices & Virtues
- "Hurricanes", by Pull Tiger Tail from the 2007 album Paws.
- "Hurricane", by Puffy AmiYumi from the 2002 album The Hit Parade
- "Hurricane", by Samestate
- "Hurricane (The Formal Weather Pattern)", by Something Corporate from Audioboxer
- "Hurricane", by Theory of a Deadman from The Truth Is...
- "Hurricane", by The Vamps from Alexander and the Terrible, Horrible, No Good, Very Bad Day
- "Hurricane", by Warm Jets from Future Signs
- "Hurricane", by MisterWives from Our Own House
- "Hurricane", by Westend, the Austrian entry in the Eurovision Song Contest 1983
- "Hurricane", from the musical Hamilton

=== Rides ===
- Hurricane (ride), an amusement ride
- Hurricane: Category 5, a former roller coaster at Myrtle Beach Pavilion
- Hurricane (Fun Spot America), a roller coaster in Kissimmee, Florida

=== Other uses in arts and entertainment ===
- Hurricane (British comics), a weekly British comic book 1964–1965
- Hurricane (painting), by John Marin, 1944
- Hurricane (pinball), a pinball game
- The Hurricane (novel), by Charles Nordhoff and James Norman Hall, 1936

== Places ==
=== Australia ===
- Hurricane, Queensland

=== United States ===
- Hurricane, Alabama
- Hurricane, Kentucky
- Hurricane, Mississippi
- Hurricane, Bollinger County, Missouri
- Hurricane, Washington County, Missouri
- Hurricane, North Carolina
- Hurricane, Utah
  - Hurricane Cliffs
  - Hurricane Mesa, a landform
- Hurricane, West Virginia
- Hurricane, Wisconsin
- Hurricane Canal, near Hurricane, Utah
- Hurricane Lake, in Minnesota
- Hurricane Pass, Grand Teton National Park, Wyoming
- Hurricane Plantation, near Vicksburg, Mississippi
- Hurricane Ridge, in Olympic National Park, Washington
  - Hurricane Hill
- Hurricane Mesa (Wyoming), a mountain in Park County, Wyoming
- Hurricane Township, Fayette County, Illinois

== Sport ==
=== Canada ===
- Guelph Hurricanes, now Cambridge Redhawks, an Ontario ice hockey team
- Lethbridge Hurricanes, an Alberta ice hockey team
- Newmarket Hurricanes, an Ontario ice hockey team
- Toronto RCAF Hurricanes, a former Ontario rugby team
- Waterloo Hurricanes, an Ontario ice hockey team
- Westfort Hurricanes, a former Ontario ice hockey team

=== United Kingdom ===
- Bristol Hurricanes, a British-Lithuanian basketball club
- Dundee Hurricanes, a former American football team
- Midlands Hurricanes, a semi-professional rugby league team in Coventry, England
- Paisley Hurricanes, an amateur rugby league team in Paisley, Scotland; see History of the Rugby League Conference

=== United States ===
- Carolina Hurricanes, an ice hockey team in Raleigh, North Carolina
- Harmarville Hurricanes, a former soccer team in Pennsylvania
- Hartford Hurricanes, a 1940s basketball team in Connecticut
- Holyoke Hurricanes, a former women's football team in Massachusetts
- Honolulu Hurricanes, a former indoor football team in Hawaii
- Houston Hurricanes (disambiguation), several teams
- Miami Hurricanes, athletic teams of the University of Miami, Florida
- Tulsa Golden Hurricane, athletic teams of the University of Tulsa, Oklahoma

=== Elsewhere ===
- Hurricanes (rugby union), in New Zealand
- Hurricanes (X-League), an American football team in Kodaira, Tokyo, Japan
- Hurricanes Rugby League, a Jamaican rugby league team
- Budapest Hurricanes, an American football team in Hungary
- Hobart Hurricanes, an Australian T20 cricket franchise
- Hørsholm Hurricanes, a softball club in Denmark
- Kiel Baltic Hurricanes, an American football team in Germany
- Saarland Hurricanes, an American football team in Germany

== Transportation and military ==
=== Air ===
- Hawker Hurricane, a British fighter aircraft of the 1930s–40s
- RAE Hurricane, a British light monoplane of the 1920s

=== Rail ===
- GWR Hurricane locomotive, on the Great Western Railway, 1838–1839
- Hurricane, a GWR 3031 Class locomotive, on the Great Western Railway, 1891–1915
- Hurricane, a Romney, Hythe and Dymchurch Railway locomotive

=== Road ===
- Jeep Hurricane, a 2005 concept vehicle
- Stellantis Hurricane engine, Stellantis engine
- Hurricane 4 EVO, an upcoming engine from Stellantis
- Willys Hurricane engine, powering the military Jeep
- Honda Hurricane (disambiguation), several Honda motorcycles
- Project Hurricane, the Ford Boss engine

=== Ships ===
- Hurricane (clipper), launched 1851
- HMS Hurricane (H06), a Royal Navy destroyer
- USS Hurricane, U.S. Navy patrol ship

=== Military ===
- 48th Armored Division (United States), nicknamed "Hurricane"
- Hurricane (weapon), a Chinese high-power microwave weapon

== Other uses ==
- Hurricane (cocktail), an alcoholic drink
- Hurricane (dog) (born 2009), a Special Operations canine of the US Secret Service
- Hurricane (nickname), including a list of people with the nickname
- Hurricane Festival, a German rock music festival
- Hurricane High School (Utah)
- Hurricane High School (West Virginia)
- ACA Hurricane, a civil defense siren
- Hurricane, a type of glass candle holder

== See also ==
- Hurricane Creek (disambiguation)
- Hurricane Mountain (disambiguation)
- Operation Hurricane (disambiguation)
- Harry Kane (disambiguation)
- Atlantic hurricane, a strong tropical cyclone in the Atlantic Ocean and northeastern Pacific Ocean
- Hurricane lamp, a type of kerosene lamp
- Hurricane glass
- Hurriganes, a 1970s Finnish rock band
