= Henry Kane =

Henry Kane may refer to:

- Henry Kane (Poltergeist), a character in the film series Poltergeist
- Henry Kane (1918–1988), American author of Mystery novels fr
- Henry B. Kane (1902–1971), American illustrator, photographer, and author of nature books for children
- Henry Coey Kane (died 1917), Royal Navy officer
- Henry Plow Kane (1825-1893), founding headmaster at Launceston Church Grammar School, Tasmania, Australia

== See also ==
- Harry Kane (disambiguation)
