= Hurricane Creek =

Hurricane Creek may refer to:

- Hurricane Creek (Alabaha River), a tributary of the Alabaha River in Georgia
- Hurricane Creek (Arkansas), a stream on the list of National Wild and Scenic Rivers
- Hurricane Creek (Black Warrior River), a tributary of the Black Warrior River, Tuscaloosa County, Alabama
- Hurricane Creek (Paint Rock River), a tributary of the Paint Rock River, arising in Tennessee and flowing into Alabama
- Hurricane Creek (Current River), a stream in Missouri
- Hurricane Creek (Missouri River), a stream in Missouri
- Hurricane Creek (Tenmile Creek), a stream in Missouri
- Hurricane Creek (Brown Creek tributary), a stream in Anson County, North Carolina
- Hurricane Creek, Cass County, Texas, a stream in Cass County, Texas
- Hurricane Creek, Wise County, Virginia, a stream in Wise County, Virginia
- Hurricane Creek Wilderness in Arkansas, on the list of U.S. Wilderness Areas

== See also ==
- Hurricane Creek mine disaster, 1970 mining accident in Hyden, Kentucky
- List of rivers of Alabama
- List of rivers of West Virginia
