= Ford Godzilla engine =

Overview
- Manufacturer: Ford Motor Company
- Production: 2020–present

Layout
- Configuration: Naturally aspirated 90° V8
- Displacement: 6.8 L (412.0 cu in); 7.3 L (445.0 cu in)
- Cylinder bore: 4.22 in (107.2 mm)
- Piston stroke: 3.681 in (93.5 mm); 3.976 in (101 mm)
- Cylinder block material: Cast iron
- Cylinder head material: Aluminum
- Valvetrain: OHV (2 valves × cyl.)
- Compression ratio: 10.8:1 (6.8); 10.5:1 (7.3)

Combustion
- Fuel system: Sequential multiport fuel injection
- Fuel type: Gasoline

Output
- Power output: 300–612 hp (224–456 kW)
- Torque output: 425–670 lb⋅ft (576–908 N⋅m)

Chronology
- Predecessor: Ford Modular V10 engine Ford Boss engine

Godzilla is a family of heavy-duty gasoline V8 engines offered by the Ford Motor Company. The engines are intended to replace the 6.8L Triton V10 and the 6.2L Boss V8 in many uses. The engine, first introduced with a displacement of 7.3L was first used with Ford Super Duty trucks starting with the 2020 model year and was later added to the Ford E-Series for the 2021 model year. A smaller-displacement 6.8L variant was introduced in 2023, but discontinued for 2027. Exterior dimensions are smaller than the 385-series 460 engine and slightly larger than those of the 351 Windsor engine. It is available as a crate engine, along with a performance-oriented version called the Megazilla.

The displacement of 7.3L is believed to be a callback to the 7.3L Power Stroke, while the 6.8L variant is a callback to the displacement of the Triton V10.

== Specifications ==
All variants are oversquare, i.e. the bore is larger than the stroke.

Variant	6.8L	7.3L (E-Series)	7.3L (Chassis Cab/Medium Duty)	7.3L (Pickup Truck)	Megazilla
Displacement	6,751 cc (6.8 L; 412.0 cu in)	7,293 cc (7.3 L; 445.0 cu in)			
Bore spacing	4.530 in (115 mm)				
Deck height	9.650 in (245 mm)				
Bore	4.220 in (107.2 mm)				
Stroke	3.681 in (93.5 mm)	3.976 in (101.0 mm)			
Valvetrain	16-valve pushrod OHV (2 valves per cylinder)				
Variable camshaft timing	Yes				No (Locked out)
Fuel system	Sequential multiport fuel injection				
Induction	Naturally aspirated				
Cylinder heads	Aluminum				CNC-ported aluminum
Pistons	Hypereutectic aluminum alloy				Mahle forged
Connecting rods	Cracked powdered metal				Callies forged H-beam
Crankshaft	Forged steel cross-plane				
Compression ratio	10.8:1	10.5:1			
Octane requirement (AKI)	87 (Regular)				91–93 (Premium)
Peak power output	405 hp (302 kW) at 5,000 rpm	300 hp (224 kW) at 3,750 rpm (Economy); 325 hp (242 kW) at 3,750 rpm (Premium)	335 hp (250 kW) at 3,900 rpm	430 hp (321 kW) at 5,500 rpm (2020–26); 420 hp (313 kW) at 5,350 rpm (2027–present)	612 hp (456 kW) at 5,580 rpm
Peak torque	445 lb⋅ft (603 N⋅m) at 4,000 rpm	425 lb⋅ft (576 N⋅m) at 3,250 rpm (Economy); 450 lb⋅ft (610 N⋅m) at 3,750 rpm (Premium)	468 lb⋅ft (635 N⋅m) at 3,750 rpm	475 lb⋅ft (644 N⋅m) at 4,050 rpm (2020–22); 485 lb⋅ft (658 N⋅m) at 4,000 rpm (2023–2026); 445 lb⋅ft (603 N⋅m) at 4,250 rpm (2027–present)	670 lb⋅ft (908 N⋅m) at 3,920 rpm

Miscellaneous characteristics:

- Knock sensors from the 6.2L Boss
- Siamesed cylinders with saw cuts between cylinders to increase cooling capacity
- Variable-displacement oil pump for optimum oil pressure

The use of OHV cylinder heads makes the Godzilla smaller than many overhead camshaft Modular engines. In addition, unlike many of Ford's turbocharged EcoBoost engines, the Godzilla does not use a wet belt to drive the oil pump.

=== 7.3L variants ===
Ford offers several different ratings of the Godzilla that prioritize either performance or economy. Performance-oriented tunings are intended as a replacement for the Modular V10 engine, while economy-oriented tunings replace the Boss V8 engine.

The highest current state of tune, offered on the Ford Super Duty (F-250/350) pickup trucks, offers 430 hp (321 kW) at 5,500 RPM and 475 lb⋅ft (644 N⋅m) of torque at 4,000 RPM. For the 2023 model year, torque was increased to 485 lb⋅ft (658 N⋅m).

For the largest Super Duty trucks (F-550/600) and the medium-duty Ford F-650/750 trucks, the engine is de-tuned to 335 hp (250 kW) at 3,750 RPM and 468 lb⋅ft (635 N⋅m) at 3,750 RPM.

The E-Series offers two versions that were de-tuned even further. The "premium-rated" version generates 325 hp (242 kW) and 450 lb⋅ft (610 N⋅m) of torque at 3,750 RPM, while the "economy-rated" variant produces 300 hp (224 kW) and 425 lb⋅ft (576 N⋅m) of torque at 3,250 RPM. The "economy-rated" variant was discontinued for 2024.

In 2026, for the 2027 model year, the Super Duty (F-250/F-350 pickup) Godzilla was de-rated to 420 hp (313 kW) at 5,350 RPM and 445 lb⋅ft (603 N⋅m) at 4,250 RPM to meet newer environmental and emissions standards.

==== Megazilla ====
The Megazilla is an off-highway crate engine offshoot of the Godzilla that generates up to 612 hp (456 kW) at 5,580 RPM and 670 lb⋅ft (908 N⋅m) of torque at 3,920 RPM on premium fuel, with at least 500 lb⋅ft (678 N⋅m) available from 2,500 to 6,000 RPM. It achieves these figures while retaining the 7.3L displacement, cast iron block, forged crankshaft, port injection system, and 10.5:1 compression of the original Godzilla by using CNC-ported aluminum cylinder heads, a 92 mm throttle body from the supercharged Predator V8 of the Mustang Shelby GT500, Mahle forged pistons, Callies H-beam forged connecting rods, and a high-performance camshaft with a VCT delete and the following specifications:

- Intake duration: 220° at 0.050 in (1.270 mm)
- Exhaust duration: 226° at 0.050 in (1.270 mm)
- Intake valve lift: 0.630 in (16.002 mm)
- Exhaust valve lift: 0.621 in (15.773 mm)
- Lobe separation angle: 111°

The camshaft is available separately from the complete Megazilla crate engine package.

=== 6.8L variant ===
A short-stroked 6.8L version has been introduced in the revamped 2023 Ford Super Duty as a replacement for the 6.2L Boss.

For 2024, the 6.8L gained flex-fuel capability.

In 2026, it was reported that the 6.8L would be discontinued for 2027 alongside the standard-output 6.7L Power Stroke, leaving the 7.3L as the only gas option in the Super Duty.

== Common applications ==
- 2020–present Ford Super Duty (F-250/350/450/550/600) (2023-present for 6.8 L)
- 2020–present Ford F-650/750
- 2021–present Ford E-Series (E-350/450)
- 2020–present Ford F-53 Motorhome Stripped Chassis
- 2020–present Ford F-59 Commercial Stripped Chassis
- 2021–present Blue Bird Vision school bus
- Crate engine (7.3L and Megazilla)
