= Ford Raptor =

High performance off-road model line from Ford

Raptor

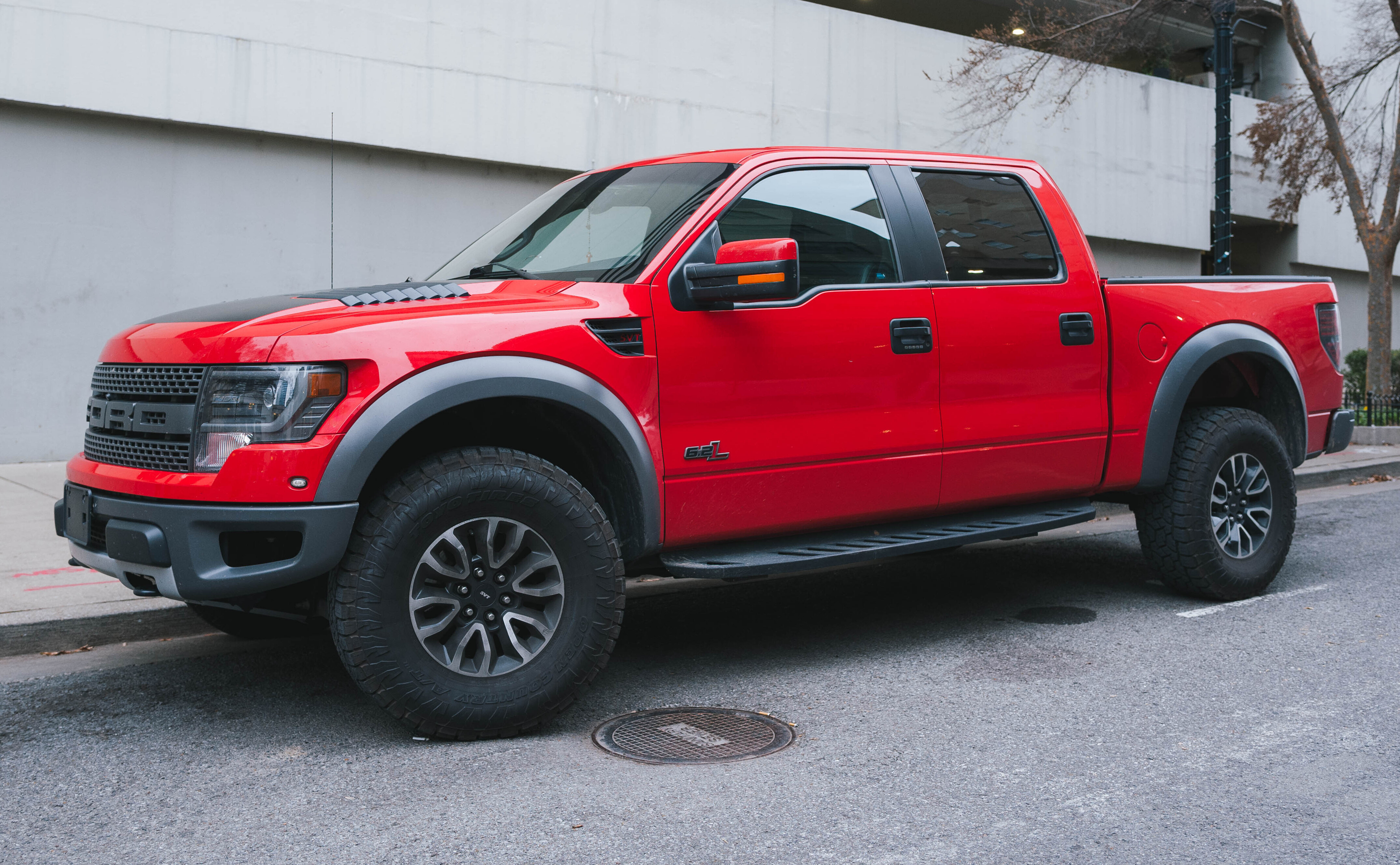
- Ford F-150 SVT Raptor (first generation)
- Product type: Pickup trucks, SUVs
- Current owner: Ford Motor Company
- Country: United States
- Introduced: 2010; 16 years ago
- Markets: Worldwide

Raptor is a nameplate used by Ford since 2010 for high-performance off-road vehicles. The Raptor designation is used on the highest-performance versions of the F-150, Ranger and Bronco.

The F-150 Raptor was introduced in 2010, the Ranger Raptor was introduced in 2019, in markets outside of North America, and the Bronco Raptor was introduced in late 2021.

The name comes from both bird of prey and the velociraptor. It is intended to be the street-legal counterpart to an off-road racing trophy truck.

== F-150 Raptor ==
=== First generation (SVT Raptor; 2010) ===
First generation (P415)
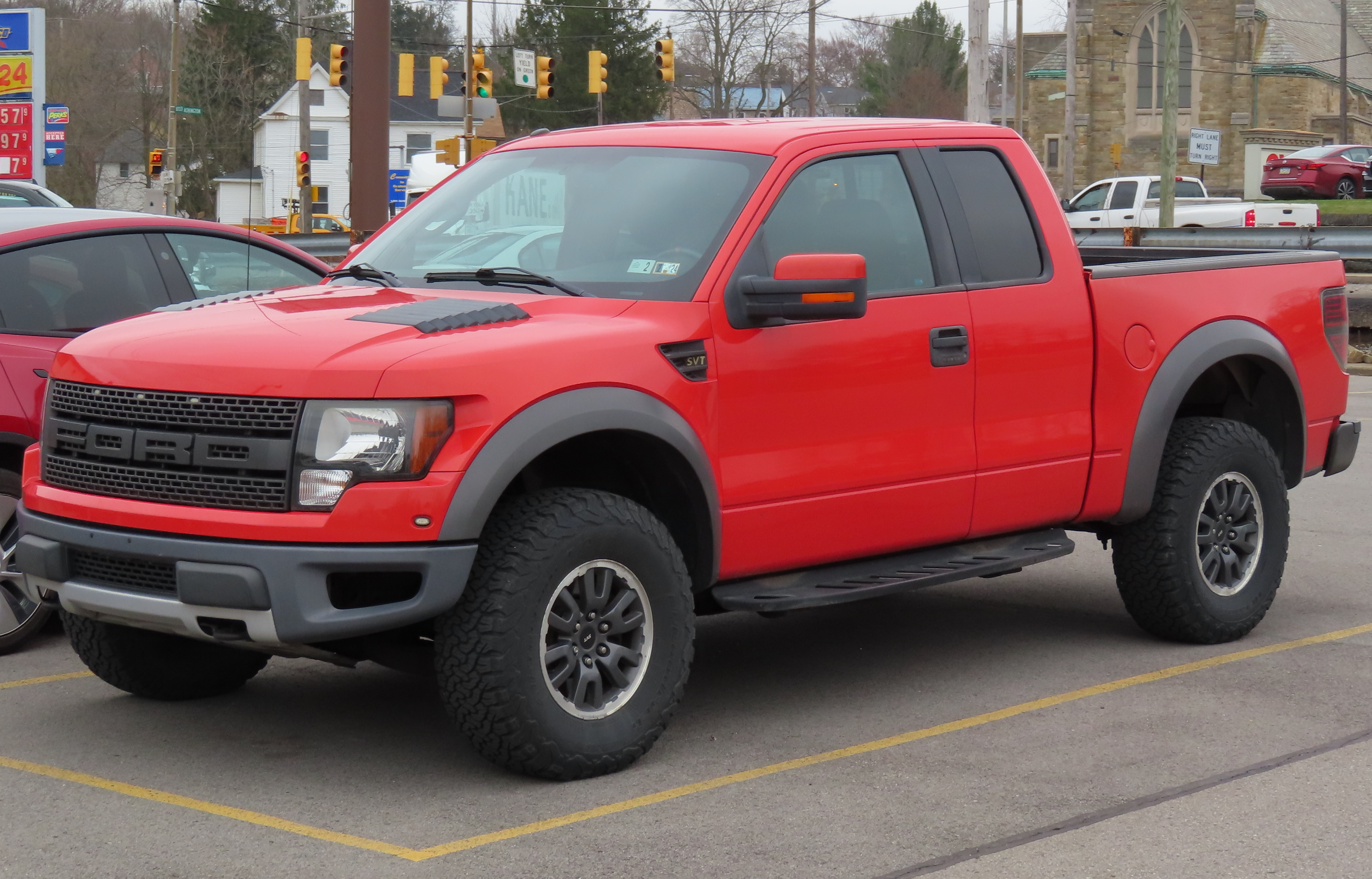
- 2010 Ford F-150 SVT Raptor SuperCab

Overview
- Manufacturer: Ford SVT
- Also called: Ford Lobo SVT Raptor (Mexico)
- Production: 2009–2014
- Model years: 2010–2014
- Assembly: United States: Dearborn, Michigan (Dearborn Truck Plant)

Body and chassis
- Class: Full-size pickup truck
- Body style: 2+2 door extended cab 4-door crew cab
- Platform: Ford T1 platform
- Related: Ford F-Series (twelfth generation)

Powertrain
- Engine: 5.4 L Modular 3-valve V8; 6.2 L Boss V8
- Transmission: 6-speed 6R80 automatic

Dimensions
- Wheelbase: SuperCab: 133.3 in (3,390 mm); SuperCrew: 145.2 in (3,690 mm)
- Length: SuperCab: 220.6 in (5,600 mm); SuperCrew: 232.1 in (5,900 mm)
- Width: 86.3 in (2,190 mm)
- Height: SuperCab: 78.5 in (1,990 mm); SuperCrew: 78.4 in (1,990 mm)
- Curb weight: SuperCab: 6,016 lb (2,729 kg); SuperCrew: 6,210 lb (2,820 kg)

For the 2010 model year, Ford SVT introduced the F-150 SVT Raptor, its second vehicle derived from the Ford F-150. In notable contrast to the on-road capability of the 1993–2004 SVT Lightning, the SVT Raptor was optimized for off-road performance, similar to a desert racing vehicle. "Raptor" was initially the vehicle's placeholder nickname during development, with Ford having to come to an arrangement with Mosler for the Raptor name rights.

The first production Raptor, molten orange with the digital mud graphic, sold at auction for $130,000 with all proceeds above the MSRP going to charity. The race version, the F-150 SVT Raptor R, was built for the Baja 1000 races. It uses a 6.2 L V8 engine rated at 500 hp (373 kW).

==== Chassis upgrades ====
SVT fitted the Raptor with Fox Racing internal bypass shocks with external reservoirs, allowing for 11.2 inches of front suspension travel, and 12.1 inches in the rear. To accommodate the long-travel suspension design, the rear leaf springs and the front upper and lower A-arms were redesigned, with SVT widening the track by seven inches and raising the ride height by two inches.

The rear axle has a locking differential with a 4.10:1 gear ratio, with an open-differential front axle. For 2012, the open front axle was replaced by a Torsen helical-gear limited-slip differential. In place of the all-season tires of the F-150, the Raptor was fitted with 315/70/17 BFGoodrich KO tires.

Towing capacity is up to 8,000 pounds (3,629 kg) with a 1,770-pound (803 kg) payload (SuperCrew only).

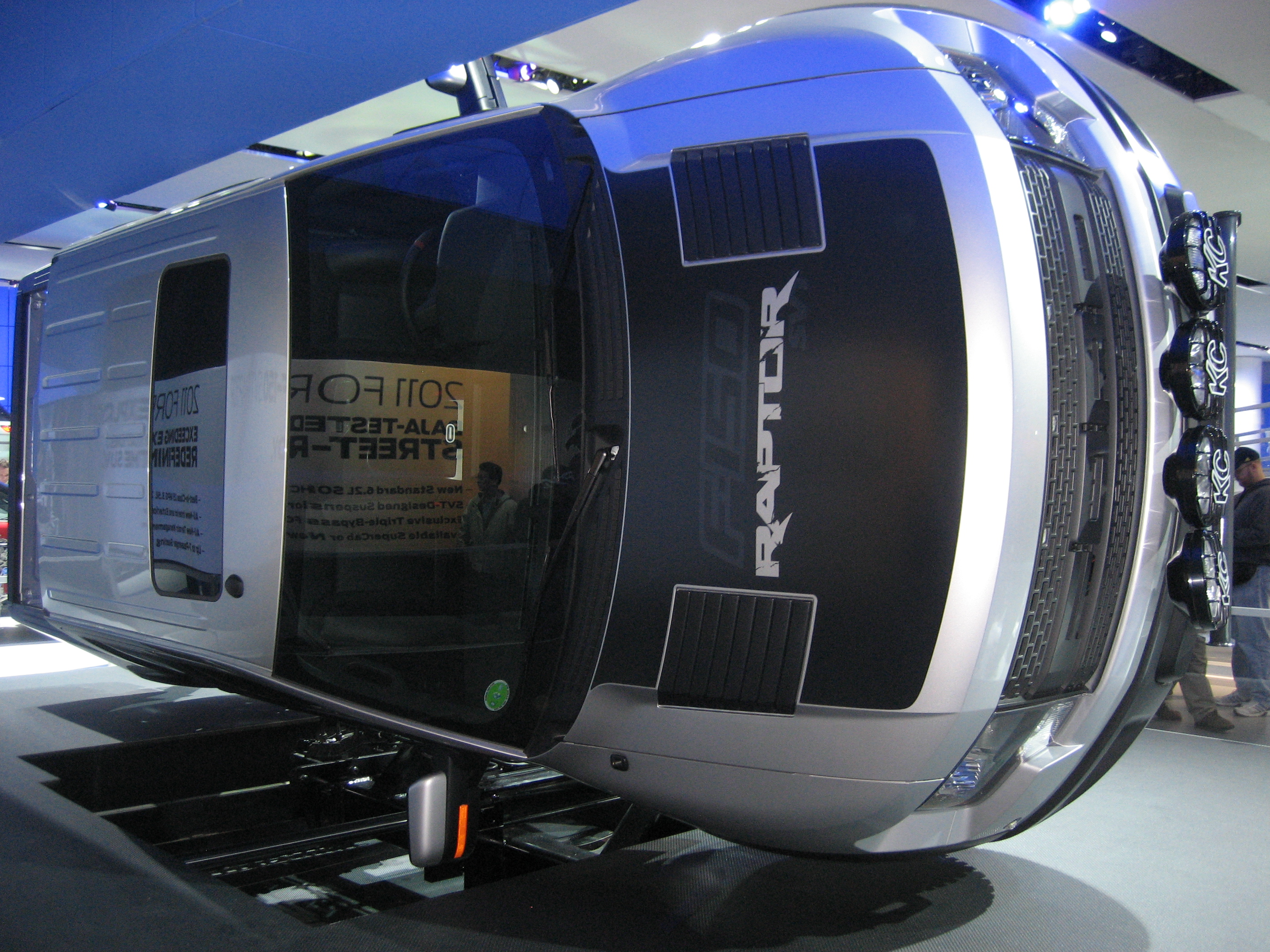
Top of body, showing hood extractors

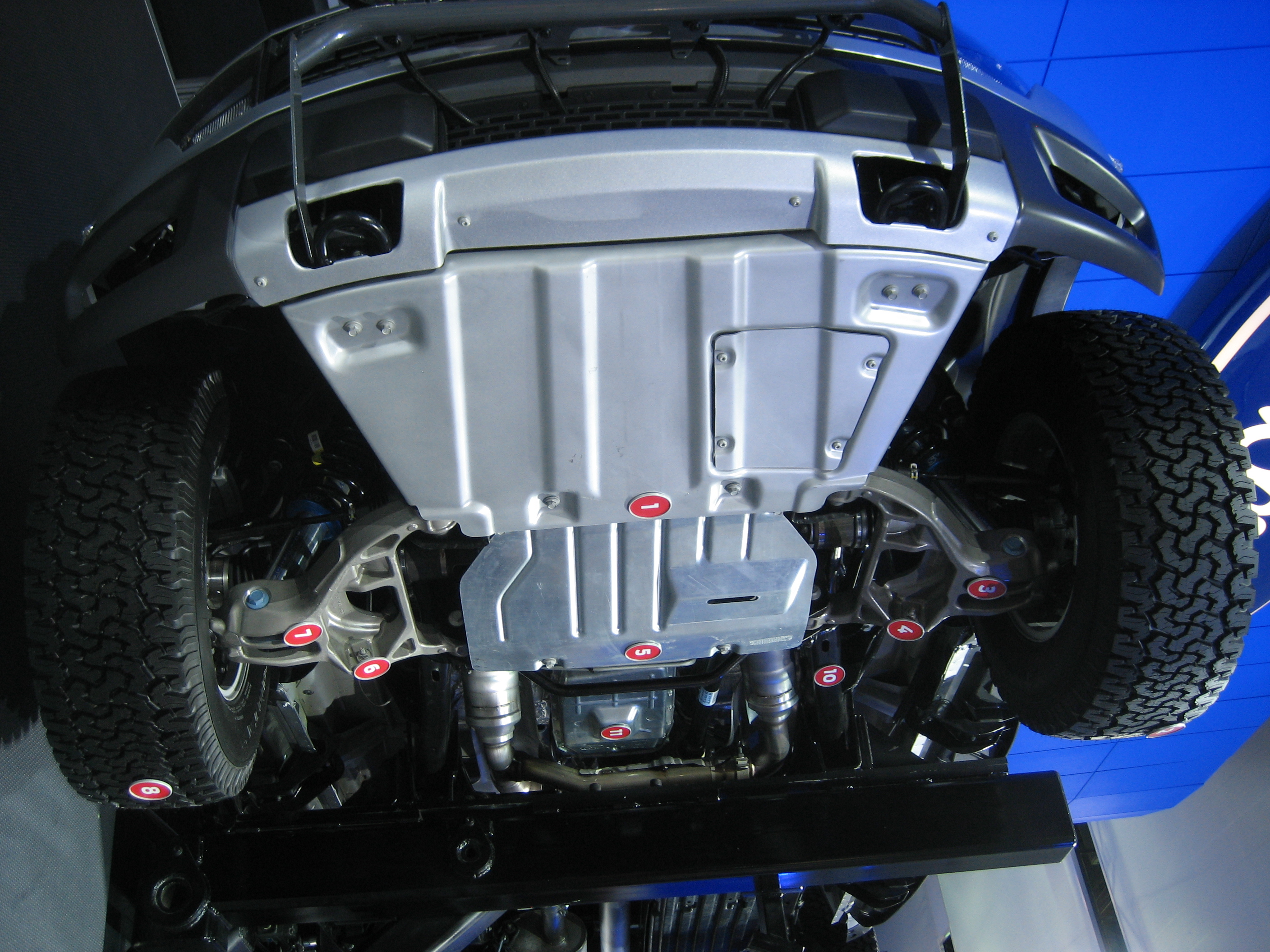
Front skid plate

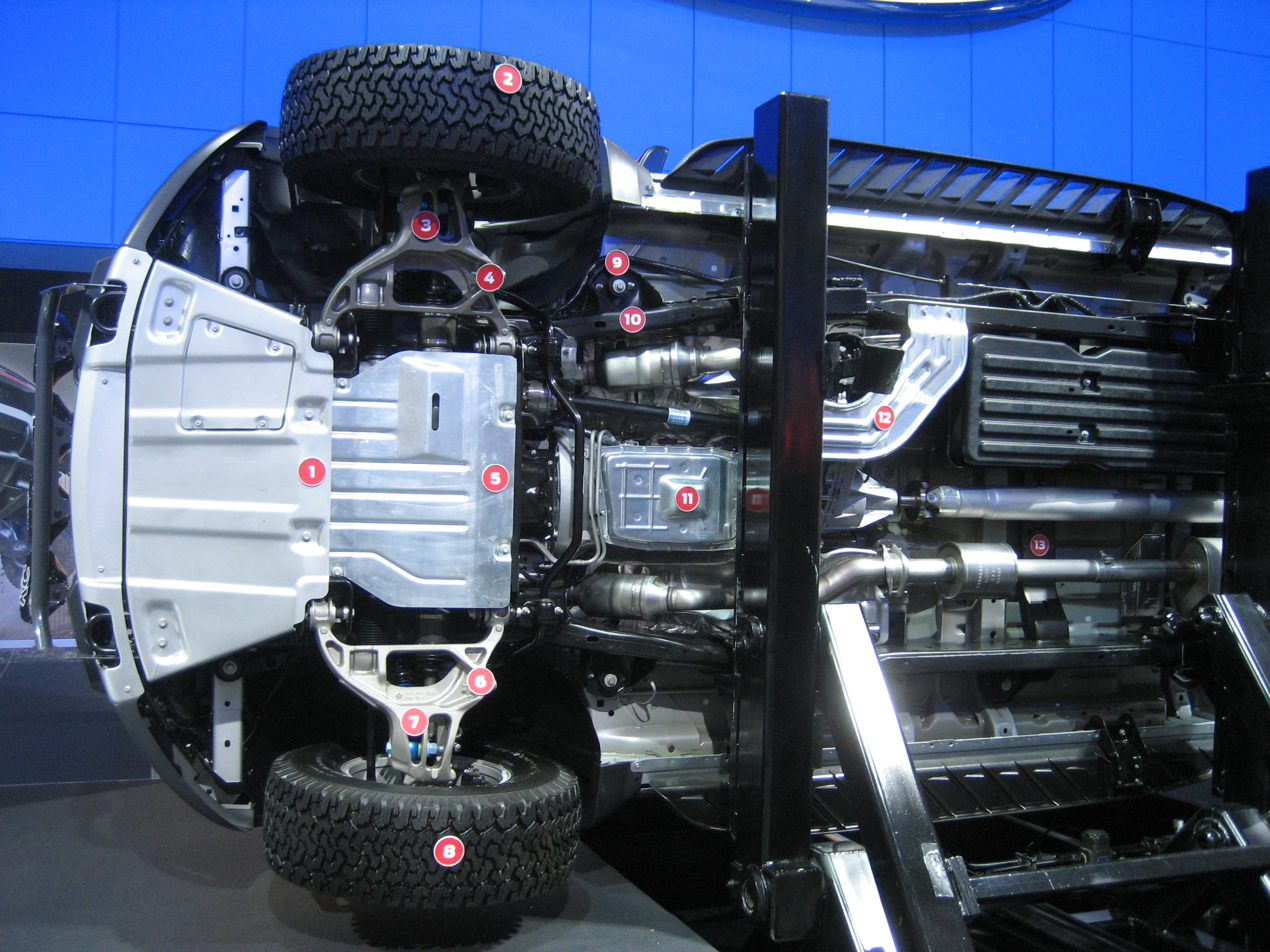
Front underbody, showing independent front suspension

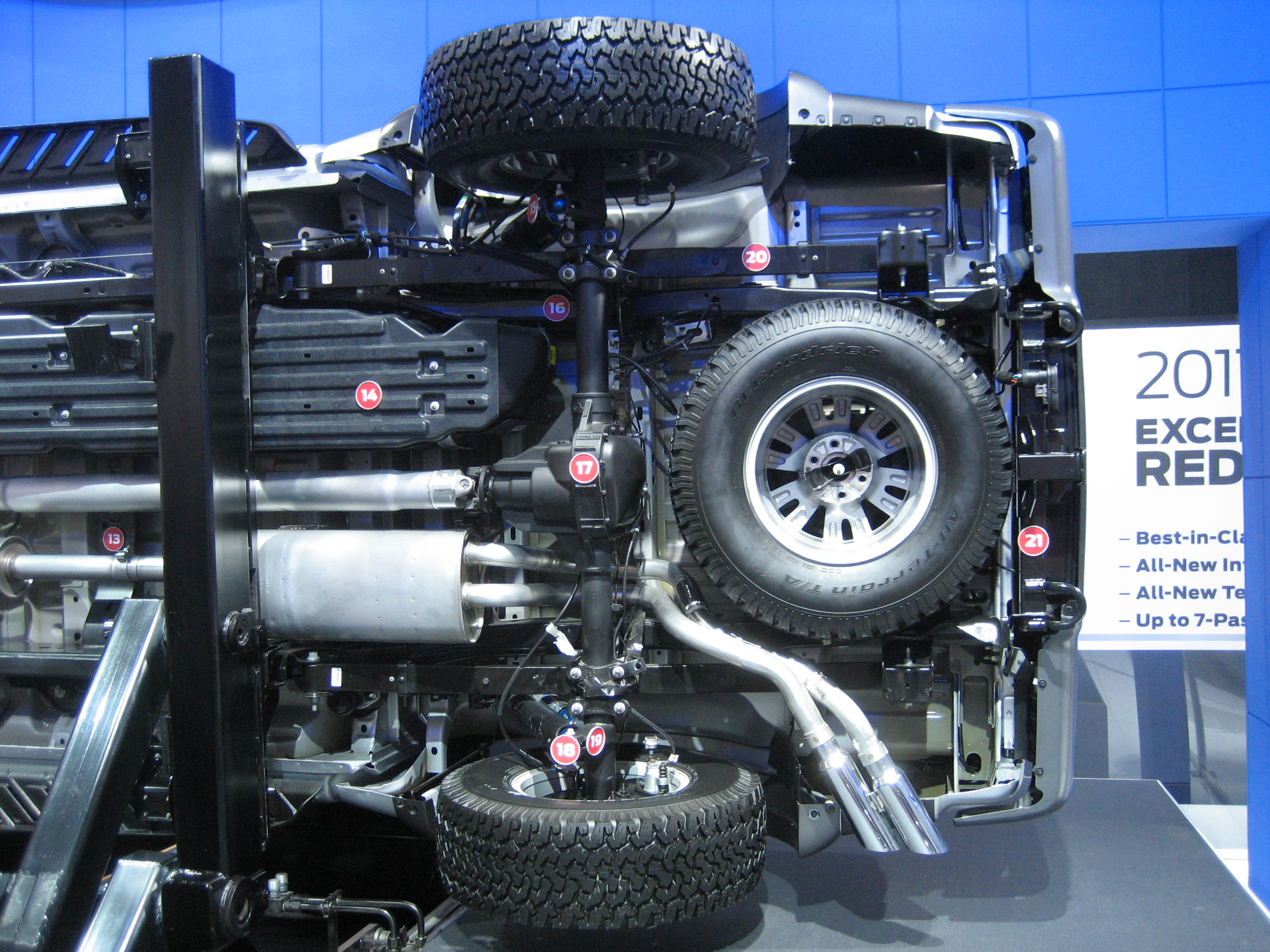
Rear underbody, showing rear suspension (and spare tire)

==== Powertrain ====
For 2010, the standard engine was a 5.4L V8 with 320 hp (239 kW; 324 PS) and 390 lb⋅ft (529 N⋅m) of torque, while an optional 6.2L V8 (shared with the Super Duty) output 411 hp (306 kW; 417 PS) and 434 lb⋅ft (588 N⋅m). Both engines were paired with a 6-speed automatic transmission. For 2011, the 5.4L engine was dropped from the F-Series as a whole, leaving the 6.2L V8 as the only engine offering for the Raptor.

==== Driving technology ====
Alongside other versions of the F-Series, the F-150 SVT Raptor was equipped with anti-locking braking (ABS), stability control (AdvanceTrac with RSC), and traction control. To optimize its capability as both an off-road and on-road vehicle, the SVT Raptor included several design features to maximize traction and control. The first Ford with hill descent control, the SVT Raptor was designed to use ABS to minimize driver modulation of the brakes (to increase control of the steering). In off-road settings, the Raptor can be driven in sport mode (traction control off) and "full off-road" mode (no electronic intervention except ABS; throttle and ABS reprogrammed for low traction).

==== Body design ====
Coinciding with the widened track and upgraded suspension, the SVT Raptor received several changes to its exterior. Sharing only its cabin and headlamps with the standard F-150, the SVT Raptor is fitted with a model-specific front fascia, with a composite hood, wider fenders (at 86.3 inches wide, the Raptor was fitted with grille-mounted clearance lamps) and the Ford Blue Oval replaced by "FORD" lettering in the grille. Though not using the Flareside configuration, the cargo bed was redesigned to accommodate the wider rear track and tires; to shorten its wheelbase and maximize its breakover angle, a 5.5-foot bed was used.

For 2010, the F-150 SVT Raptor was offered solely as a 2+2 door SuperCab (a regular cab Raptor was never developed) and was offered in four colors: Tuxedo Black, Oxford White, Blue Flame, and Molten Orange. As an option, Ford offered a "digital mud" vinyl decal for the rear sides of the vehicle. For 2011, a four-door SuperCrew cab configuration was introduced, alongside a fifth color from all other F-150 trims: Ingot Silver.

Largely equipped between the F-150 XLT and Lariat, the SVT Raptor is fitted with several interior features specific to the model line, serving as functional upgrades. Alongside high-bolstered seats, an orange stripe was added to the leather wrap of the steering wheel (serving as a visual centering reference). In line with the Super Duty, the SVT Raptor was prewired for aftermarket equipment.

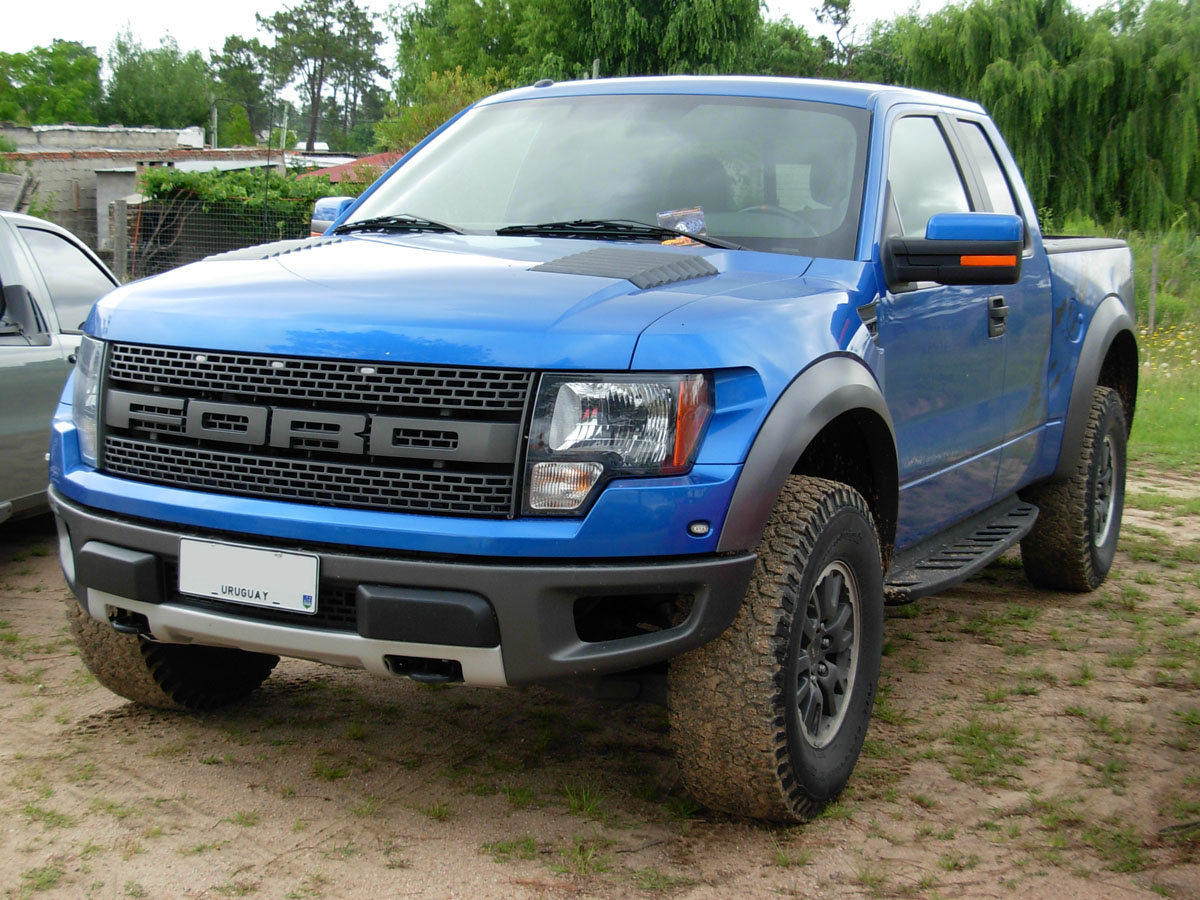
Ford F-150 SVT Raptor SuperCab

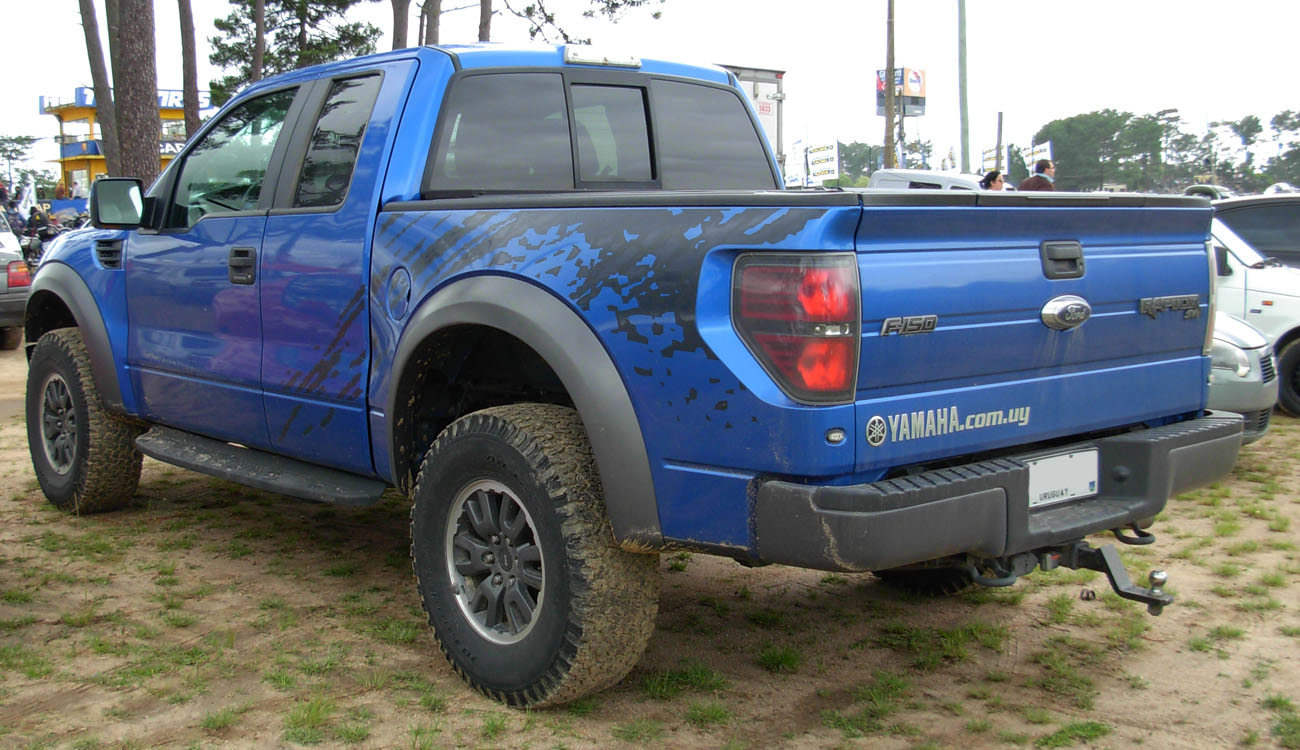
Ford F-150 SVT Raptor SuperCab, rear (showing "digital mud" graphic)

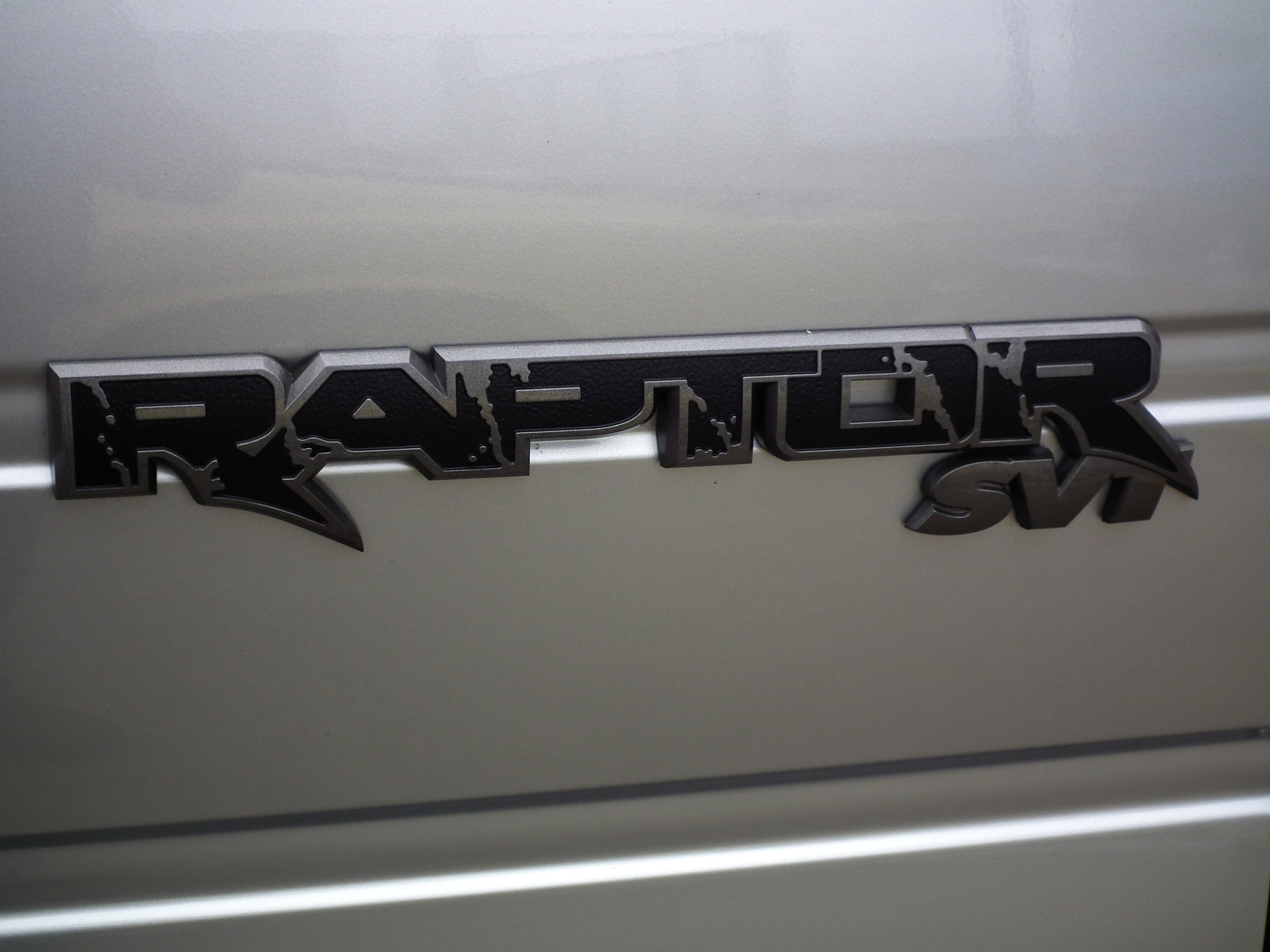
SVT Raptor badging

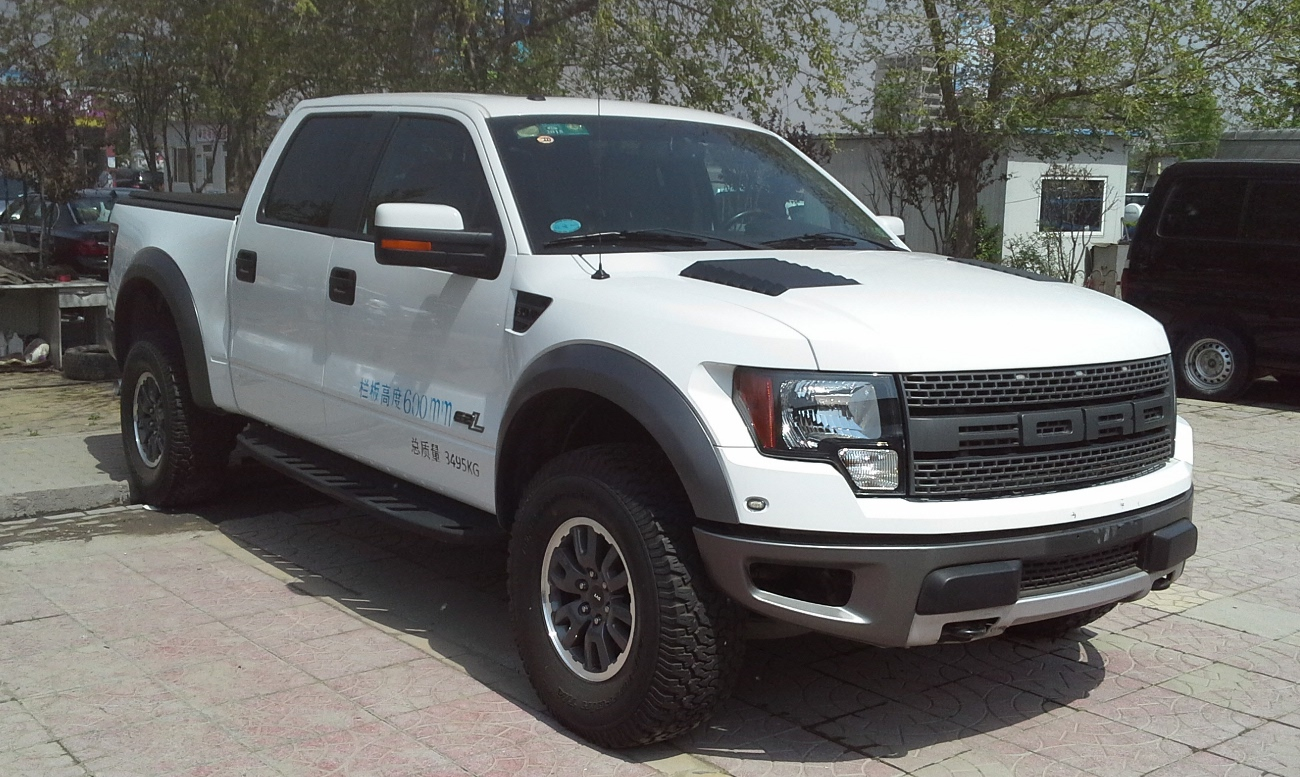
Ford F-150 SVT Raptor SuperCrew

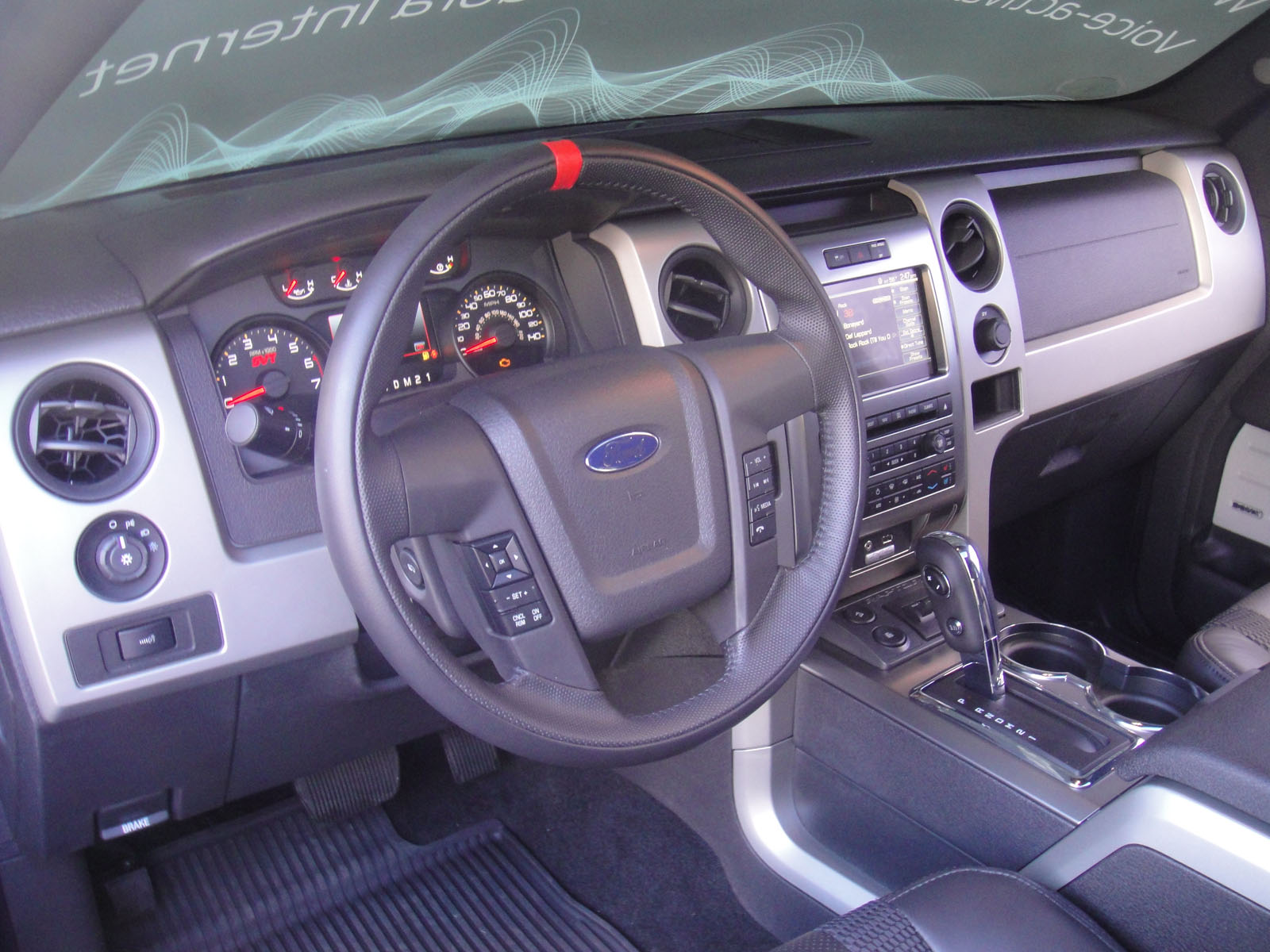
SVT Raptor interior

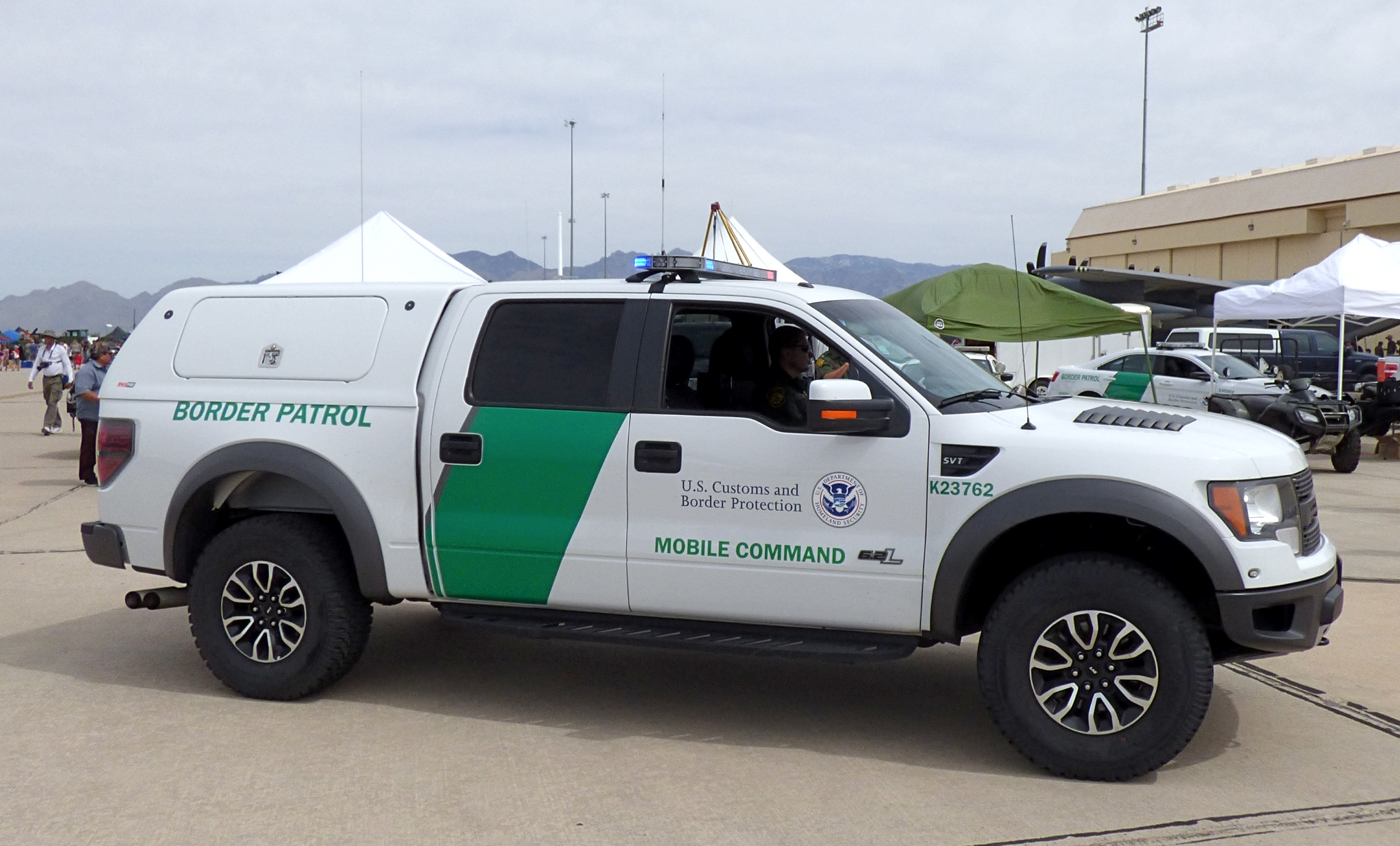
F-150 SVT Raptor in use by U.S. Customs and Border Protection as a mobile command vehicle.

=== Second generation (2017) ===
Second generation (P552)
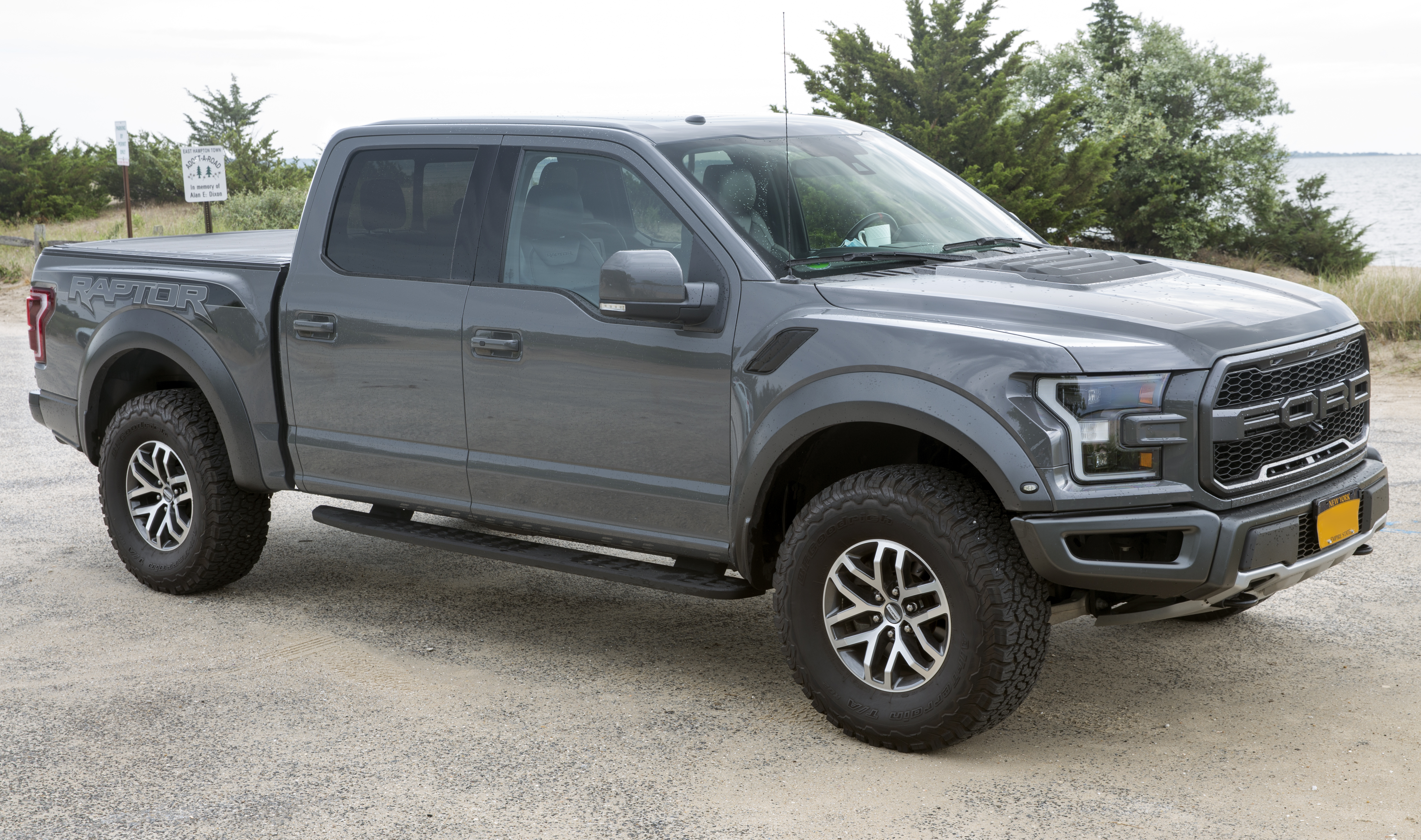
- 2018 Ford F-150 Raptor

Overview
- Manufacturer: Ford
- Also called: Ford Lobo Raptor (Mexico); Sutton CS 3500 (Malaysia)
- Production: 2017–2020
- Model years: 2017–2020
- Assembly: United States: Dearborn, Michigan (Dearborn Truck Plant); Malaysia: Gurun, Kedah (CKD)
- Designer: Gordon Platto

Body and chassis
- Class: Full-size pickup truck
- Body style: 2+2 door extended cab 4-door crew cab
- Platform: Ford T platform (T3)
- Related: Ford F-Series (thirteenth generation)

Powertrain
- Engine: 3.5 L EcoBoost D35 twin-turbo V6
- Transmission: 10-speed 10R80 automatic

Dimensions
- Wheelbase: SuperCab: 134.2 in (3,410 mm); SuperCrew: 146.0 in (3,710 mm)
- Length: SuperCab: 220.0 in (5,590 mm); SuperCrew: 231.9 in (5,890 mm)
- Width: 86.3 in (2,190 mm)
- Height: 78.5 in (1,990 mm)
- Curb weight: SuperCab: 5,525 lb (2,506 kg); SuperCrew: 5,697 lb (2,584 kg)

Following the 2014 introduction of the thirteenth-generation F-Series, the Raptor model line went on a two-year hiatus. Unveiled as a pre-production vehicle in January 2015 at the 2015 Detroit International Auto Show, the second generation of the Raptor was released in early 2017 for the 2017 model year, dropping the SVT prefix. As with its predecessor, the second-generation Raptor is a pickup truck derived from the F-150, optimized for off-road capability.

As with the standard F-150, the Raptor is an aluminum-intensive vehicle, using steel primarily for the frame rails; compared to the SVT Raptor, curb weight was reduced by over 500 pounds.

==== Chassis specifications ====
As with the previous generation, the Raptor retained Fox Racing internal-bypass shocks with external reservoirs. With larger shocks (3 inches, from 2.5), wheel travel increased to 13 inches for the front axle (13.9 for the rear). An all-new transfer case was introduced; a torque-on-demand system, the design combined the on-demand capability of all-wheel drive with the durability of four-wheel drive. With a widened track over the F-150, the Raptor again used a leaf-sprung rear axle and upper and lower A-arms for the front axle. For 2019, the Fox Racing shocks were updated with "Live Valve" capability, automatically adjusting for the terrain.

As before, 35-inch all-terrain tires were fitted to 17-inch wheels; as a rare option for a mass-produced vehicle, Ford offered beadlock wheels to prevent tire bead separation from the wheel at low pressures.

===== Powertrain =====
In a significant departure from its predecessor, the second-generation Raptor was not offered with a V8 engine. Instead, it uses a high-output second-generation 3.5L EcoBoost twin-turbocharged gasoline V6, which is a detuned version of the engine used in the Ford GT, rated at 450 hp and 510 lb-ft of torque, which it also shares with the Lincoln Navigator. The 2017 Raptor marked the debut of the 10-speed 10R80 automatic transmission, the first non-commercial vehicle fitted with a 10-speed transmission (of any type).

==== Body design ====
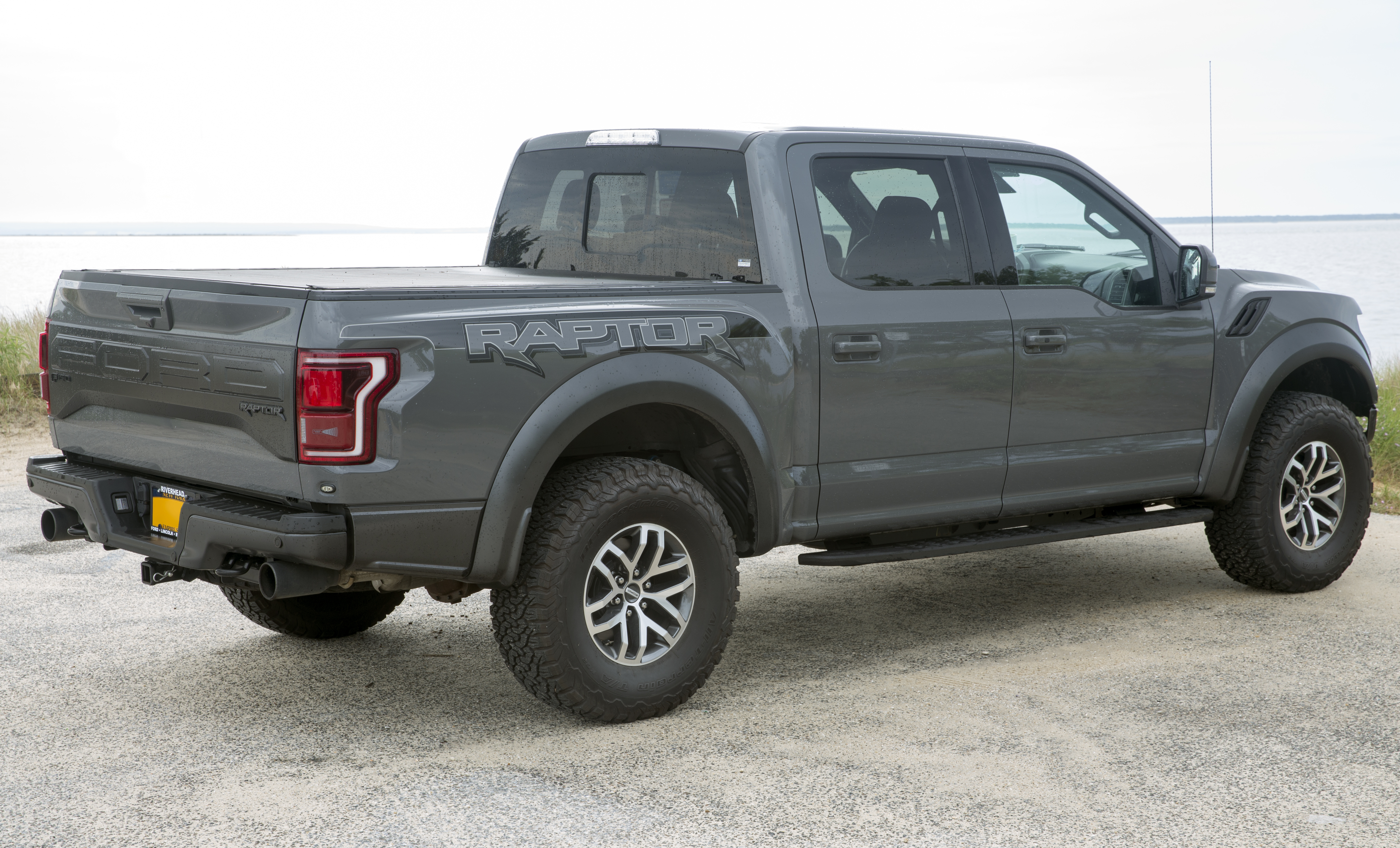
2018 Ford F-150 Raptor SuperCrew

As with the standard F-150, much of the body of the Raptor is constructed of aluminum, using a composite hood. In line with the previous generation, the "FORD" grille replaced the Ford Blue Oval emblem, with clearance lights mounted in the grille and front fenders (mandated due to its width). Sharing its 5.5-foot length with the SuperCrew, the pickup bed design is specific to the Raptor.

Alongside the previous generation, the Raptor is offered in both SuperCab and SuperCrew configurations. The "digital mud" decal option was replaced by a large black decal on the pickup bed, denoting the Raptor name; as an additional option, a black "FORD" tailgate decal is offered.

=== Third generation (2021) ===
Third generation (P702)
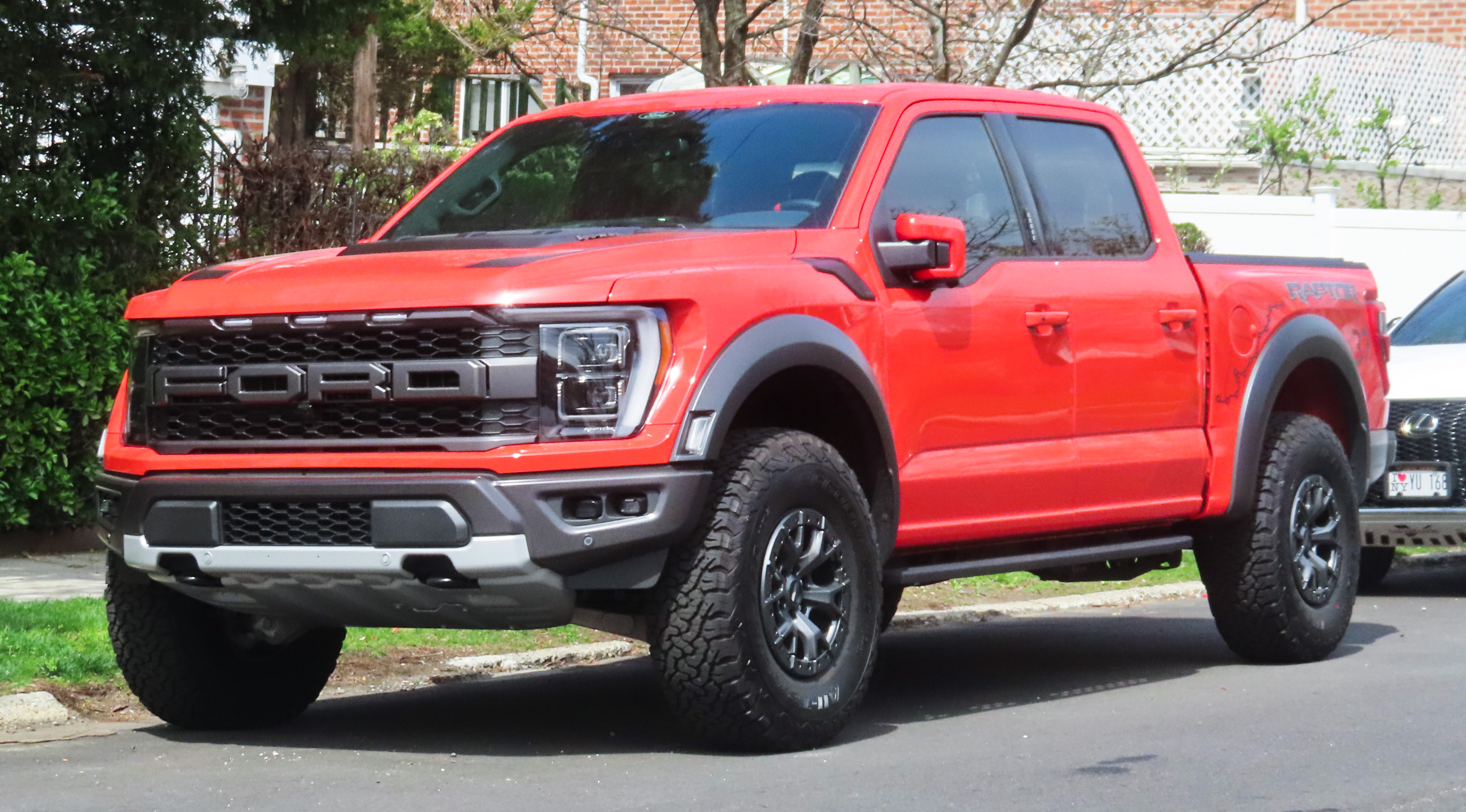

Overview
- Manufacturer: Ford
- Also called: Ford Lobo Raptor (Mexico)
- Production: 2021–present
- Model years: 2021–present
- Designer: Tom Liu

Body and chassis
- Class: Full-size pickup truck
- Body style: 4-door crew cab

Powertrain
- Engine: 3.5 L EcoBoost D35 twin-turbo V6; 5.2 L Carnivore supercharged V8
- Transmission: 10-speed automatic transmission

Dimensions
- Wheelbase: 3,693 mm (145.4 in)
- Length: 5,908 mm (232.6 in)
- Width: 2,200 mm (86.6 in)
- Height: 2,027–2,050 mm (79.8–80.7 in)

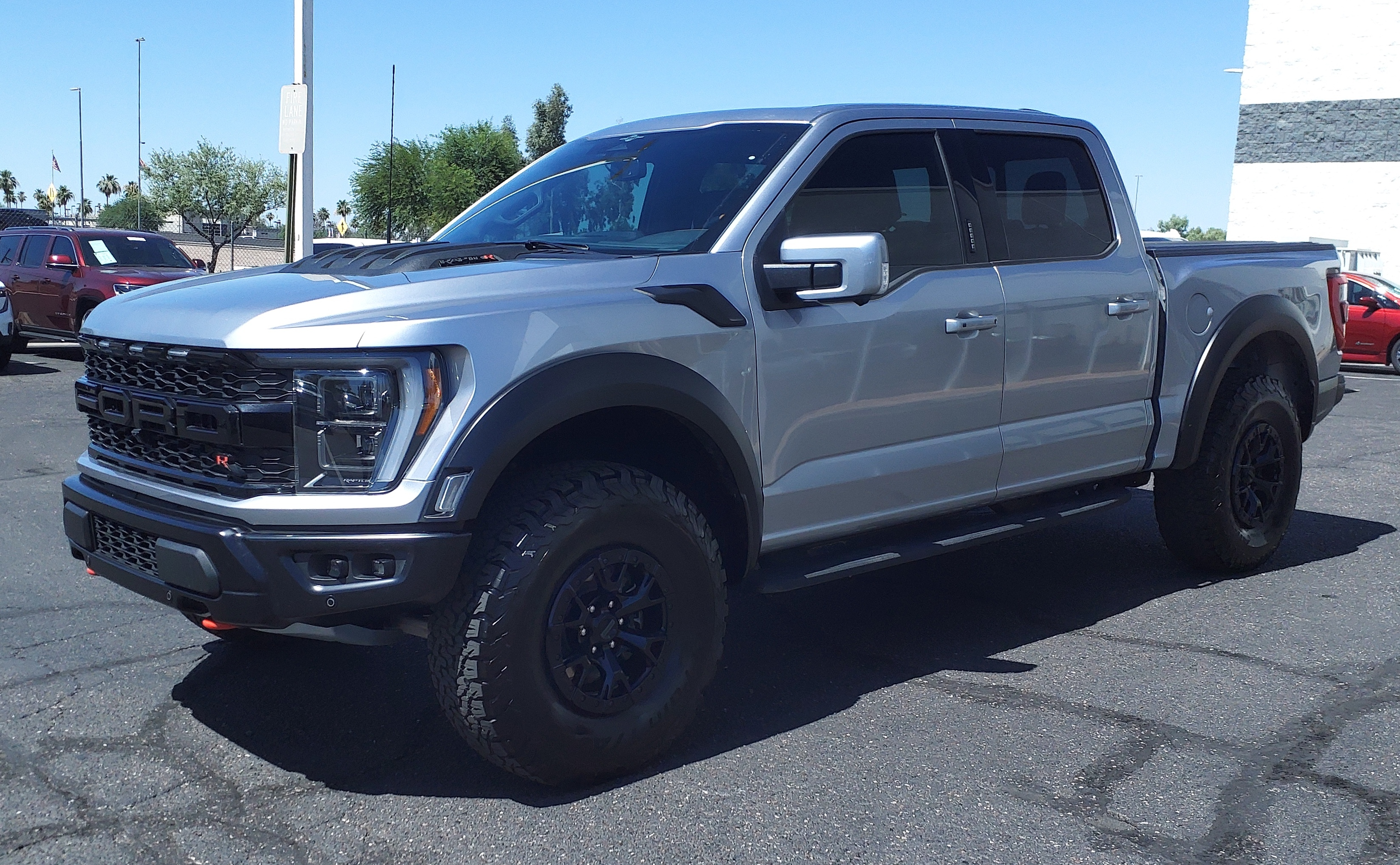
2023 F-150 Raptor R

Ford introduced the third generation F-150 Raptor in February 2021; the new base model retains the same 3.5-liter EcoBoost V6 engine as its predecessor. For the first time ever on a production light-duty truck, the 2021 Ford Raptor 37 does offer 37” tires from the factory. Ford also confirmed the return of a V8 powered Raptor, the Raptor R, utilizing a 5.2L Carnivore supercharged V8 engine which produces 700 hp (522 kW) and 640 lb⋅ft (868 N⋅m), based on the 5.2L Predator in the Mustang Shelby GT500, to compete against the new Ram 1500 TRX. The rear suspension of the Raptor no longer uses leaf springs, opting instead to have coil springs and a five link setup with Panhard bar.

=== 2024 refresh and Raptor R updates ===
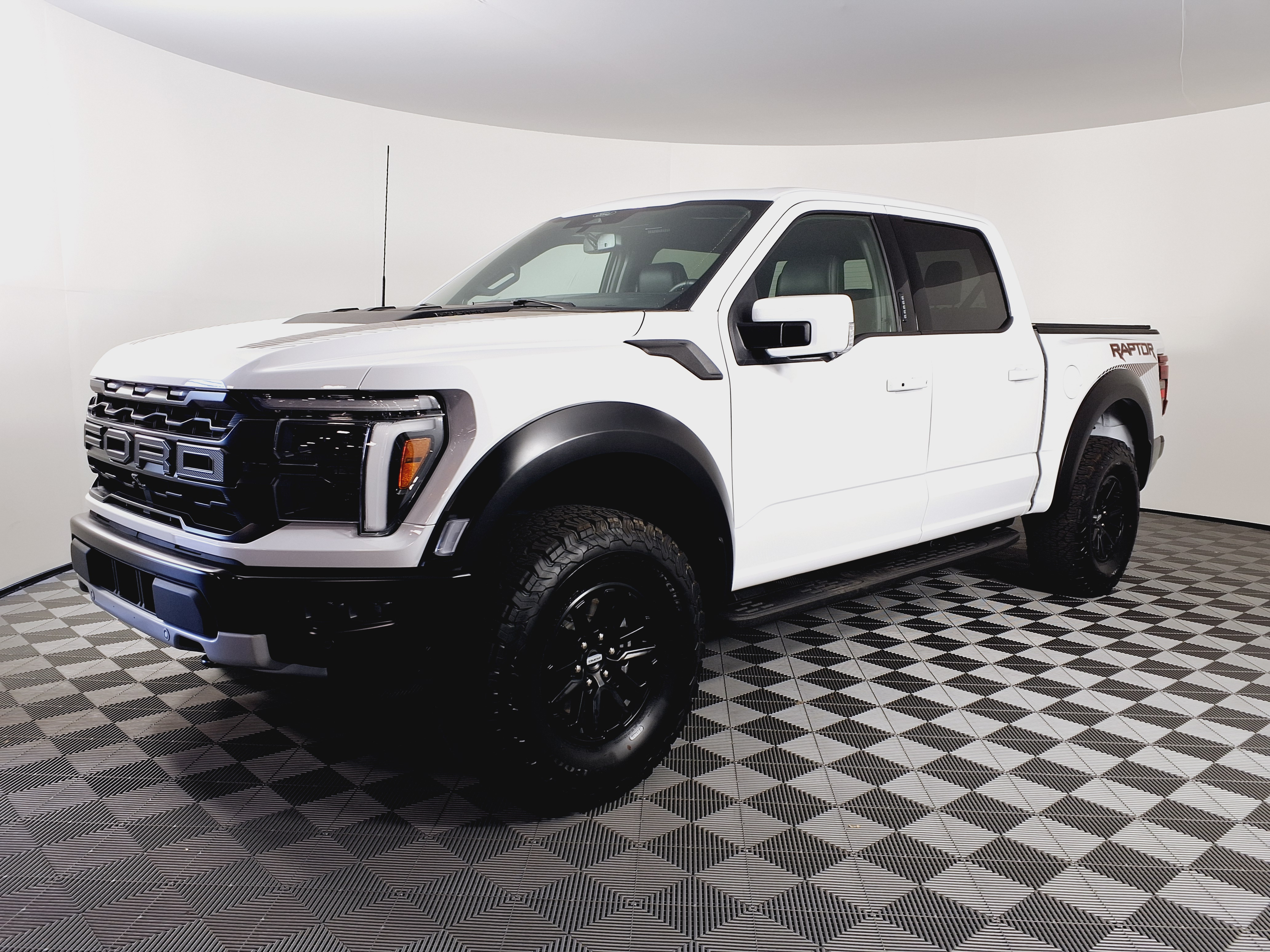
2025 F-150 Raptor (facelift)

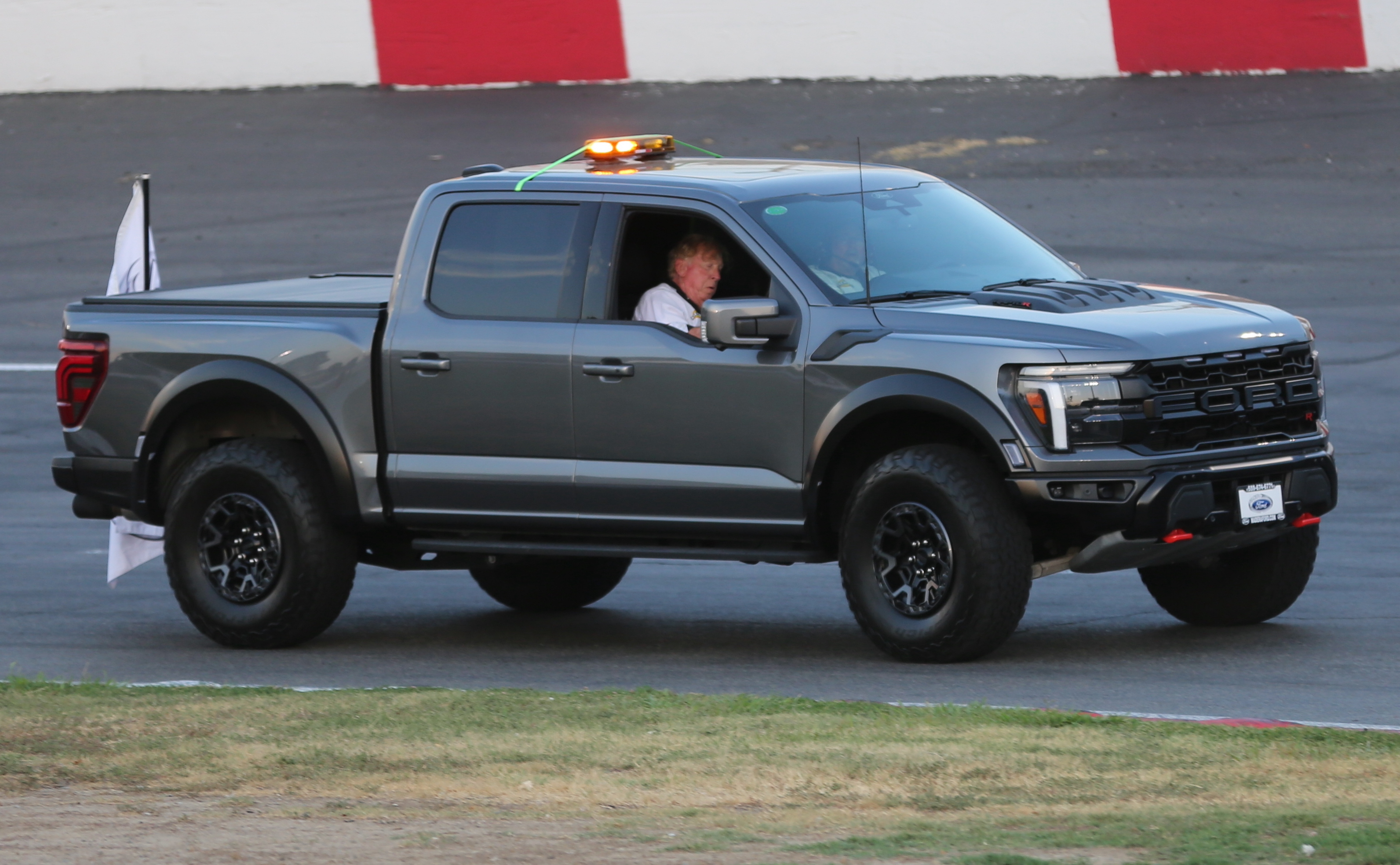
2025 F-150 Raptor R (facelift)

For the 2024 model year, Ford introduced a mid-cycle refresh for the third-generation F-150 Raptor, focusing on suspension technology and increased performance for the Raptor R. The engine output was also increased to 720 hp (537 kW).

==== Mechanical and suspension ====
The most significant mechanical update is the introduction of new FOX Dual Live Valve shocks. Building on the previous Live Valve technology, the dual-valve system adds position-sensitive compression control and continuously variable rebound control. This allows the suspension to adapt more precisely to high-speed desert running and low-speed crawling by adjusting damping at both the compression and rebound stages.

The Raptor R received a power increase for its 5.2-liter supercharged V8 engine. Through optimized air intake and revised calibration, the output was raised to 720 hp (537 kW) and 640 lb⋅ft (868 N⋅m), an increase of 20 hp (15 kW) over the previous model. This update officially made the Raptor R the most powerful gas-powered production pickup in its class at the time of release.

==== Exterior and utility ====
Visually, the 2024 refresh features a revised front end with new "C-clamp" LED headlamps and a modular front bumper. The modular bumper is designed to be more durable and allows for the easier addition of off-road lighting accessories or a winch. It also exposes more of the front tires, improving the truck's approach angle for technical terrain.

Other new utility features include:

- Pro Access Tailgate: A new multi-function tailgate design that incorporates a side-swinging door, allowing users to access the bed even when a trailer is attached.
- Shelter Green: A new Raptor-exclusive exterior paint color.
- Standard 37-inch Tires: The Raptor R now comes standard with 37-inch BFGoodrich All-Terrain T/A KO2 tires, which were previously an optional package on the standard V6 Raptor.

==== Interior and technology ====
The 2024 refresh introduced a Head-Up Display (HUD) to the Raptor for the first time, featuring specialized off-road drive modes that project real-time pitch, roll, and drivetrain status onto the windshield. The infotainment system continues to utilize Ford's SYNC 4 on a 12-inch touchscreen, but with enhanced software for Trail Control and Trail 1-Pedal Drive, which simplifies off-roading by allowing the driver to control the vehicle's speed using only the accelerator pedal.

== Ranger Raptor ==
=== First generation (2019) ===
For the 2019 model year, Ford introduced the Ranger Raptor, derived from the global Ranger T6 mid-size pickup truck. Slotted above the Wildtrak appearance package, the Raptor is fitted with suspension and chassis upgrades to improve its off-road capability. In line with its F-150 namesake, the Raptor is fitted with a widened track and a raised ride height.

The Ranger Raptor is fitted with a 2.0L EcoBlue biturbo diesel engine, producing 210 hp (157 kW). Shared with globally-marketed versions of the Ford Transit and the Ford Everest, the engine is coupled to a 10-speed automatic transmission (shared with the F-150, including the Raptor). Similar to the F-150 Raptor, the four-wheel drive system of the Ranger Raptor is adaptable to terrain.

While not wide enough to require clearance lights, the Ranger Raptor adopts several design elements of its F-150 counterpart, including gray six-spoke wheels, a FORD-lettered grille, and large Raptor decals on the sides of the cargo bed.

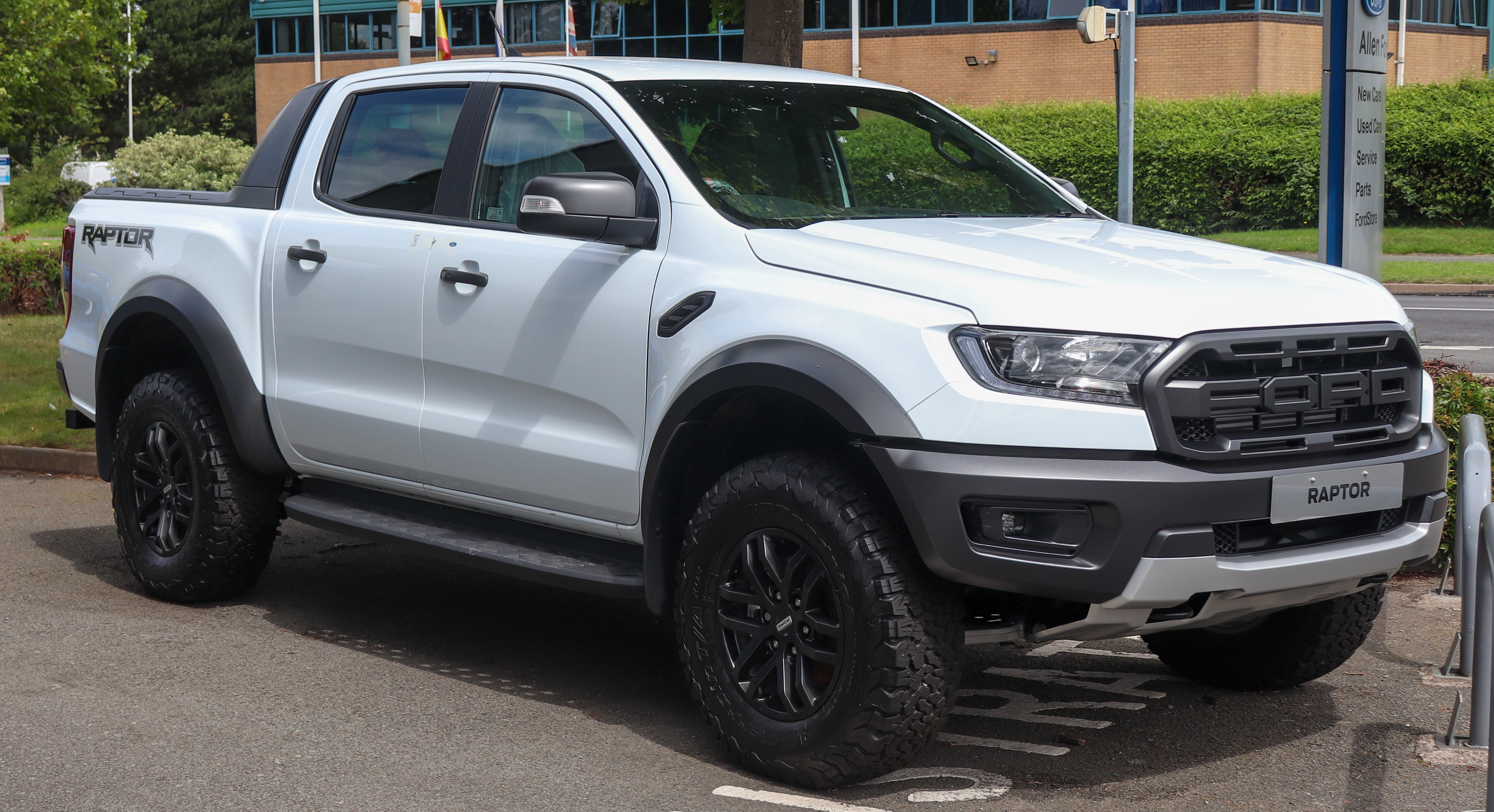
Ford Ranger Raptor (first generation)

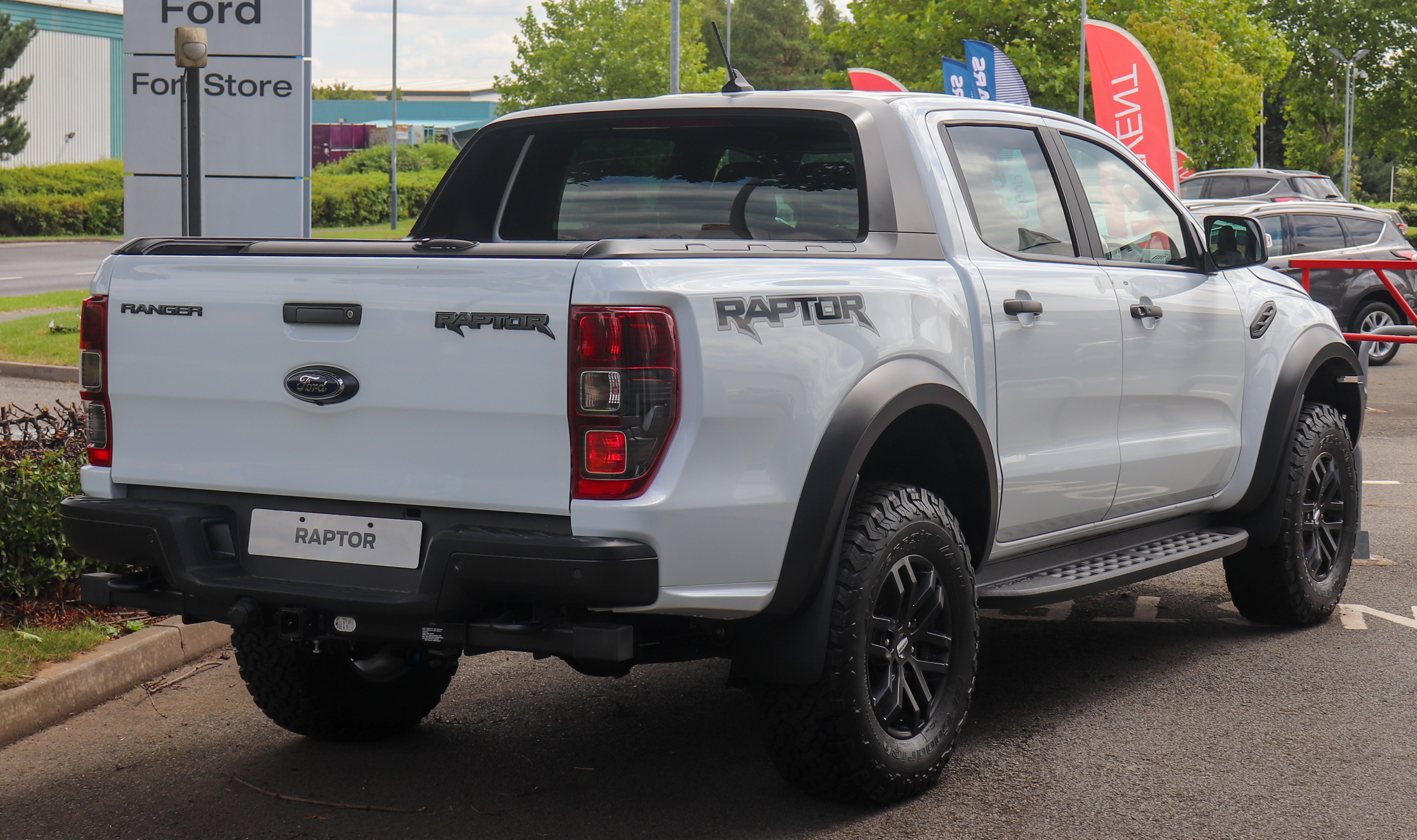
Rear view

==== North American exclusion ====
In October 2018, Ford confirmed that the Ranger Raptor will not be marketed in the United States (until the second generation). While the marketing of the model would have offered Ford a direct competitor to the Chevrolet Colorado ZR2, Ford has cited the risk of model overlap with the larger F-150 Raptor (a model whose demand exceeds supply). A secondary factor is the powertrain design: as the 2.0L EcoBlue diesel engine (not yet approved for US emissions standards) offers similar output to the regular Ranger's 2.3-liter EcoBoost gasoline engine; a redesign to include a more powerful engine was cited as too costly.

While unlikely to be sold in North America in its first generation, as a mid-size truck, the Ranger Raptor is sold in markets where the F-Series based Raptor is unlikely to be widely marketed because of its larger size, although in some markets such as Argentina and Mexico, the Ranger Raptor is sold alongside the F-150 Raptor.

=== Second generation (2022) ===
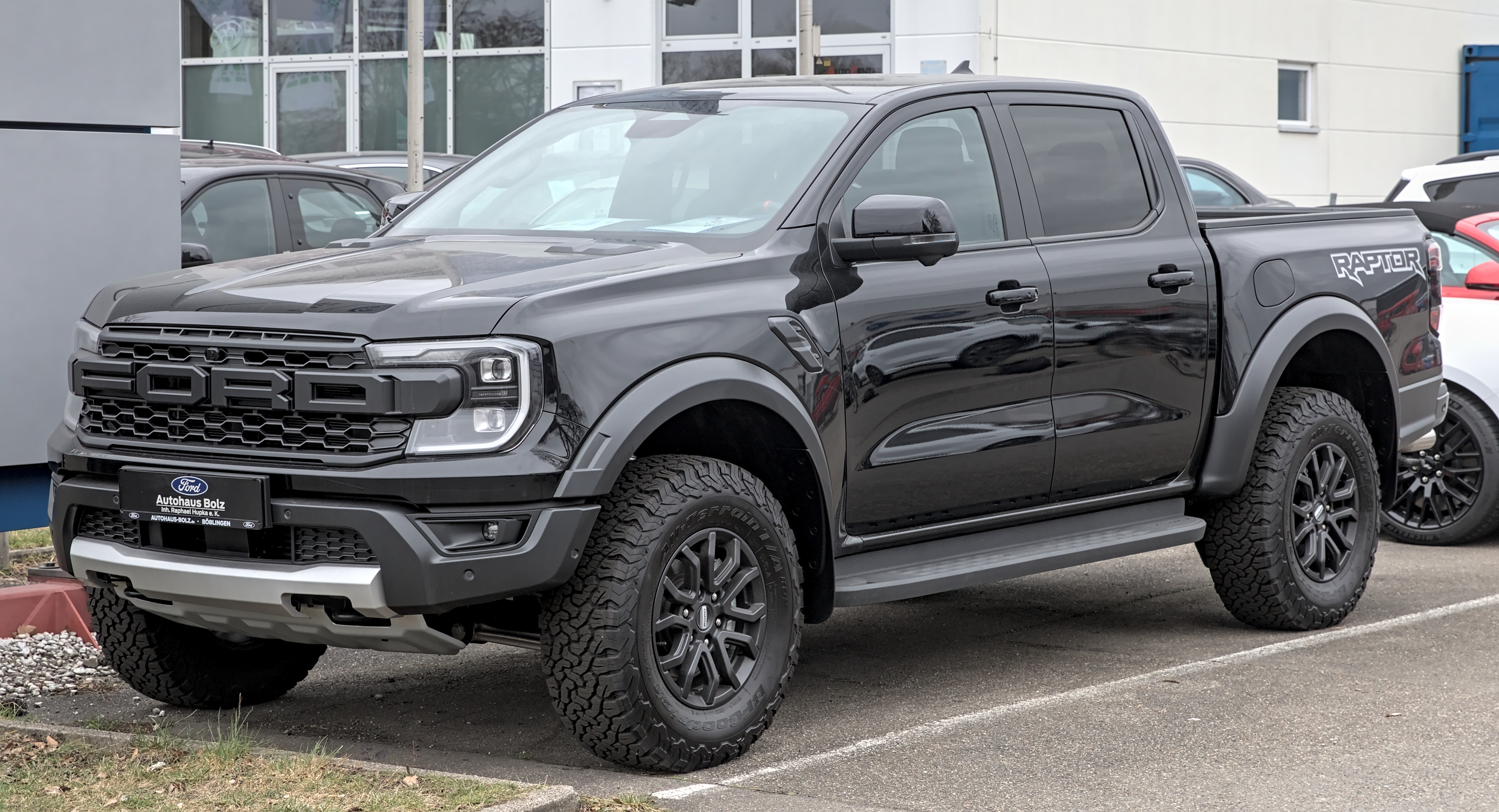
2022 Ranger Raptor

The second-generation Ranger Raptor was unveiled in February 2022. It is powered by a twin-turbo 3.0-liter EcoBoost V6 petrol engine rated at 292 kW (397 PS; 392 hp) for the Australian market while the European market is limited to 212 kW (288 PS; 284 hp) to meet EU emissions standards and paired with a 10-speed automatic transmission. The second-generation Ranger Raptor will be sold in the United States and Canada starting in 2023. The American-spec Ranger Raptor was unveiled in May 2023, with its power output rated at 405 hp (302 kW; 411 PS) and will concurrently launch with the standard Ranger trims by late summer 2023.

=== Ranger Raptor (North American debut) ===
In 2024, Ford officially brought the Ranger Raptor to the North American market. Positioned as the "mid-sized" sibling to the F-150, it features a 3.0-liter EcoBoost V6 engine producing 405 hp (302 kW) and 430 lb⋅ft (583 N⋅m). It utilizes a similar suspension philosophy, including 2.5-inch FOX Live Valve shocks and a Watt's link rear suspension to handle high-speed off-road maneuvers. It also introduced a dedicated "Baja Mode" which includes an anti-lag system that keeps the turbochargers spinning for up to three seconds after the driver backs off the throttle, ensuring immediate power delivery upon exit from corners.

== Bronco Raptor ==
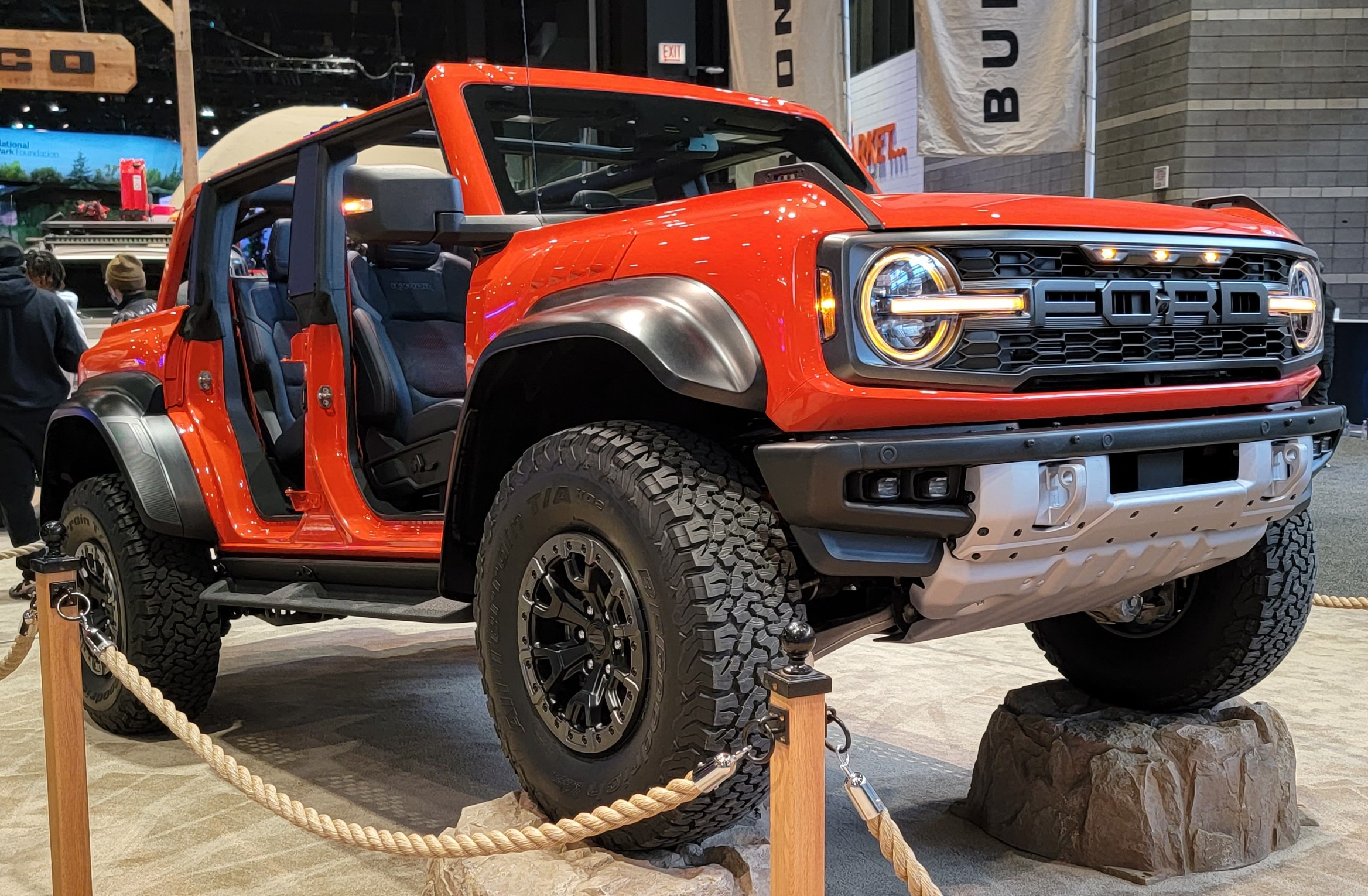
2023 Ford Bronco Raptor

For the 2022 model year, Ford introduced the Bronco Raptor. It was developed under the codename "Warthog", but Ford chose to bring it to market with the already recognized "Raptor" name instead. It has 37-inch tires, a 3.0-liter twin-turbo EcoBoost V6 and 10-speed automatic transmission shared with the Ford Explorer.
