= Siamesed cylinders =

Type of engine cylinders

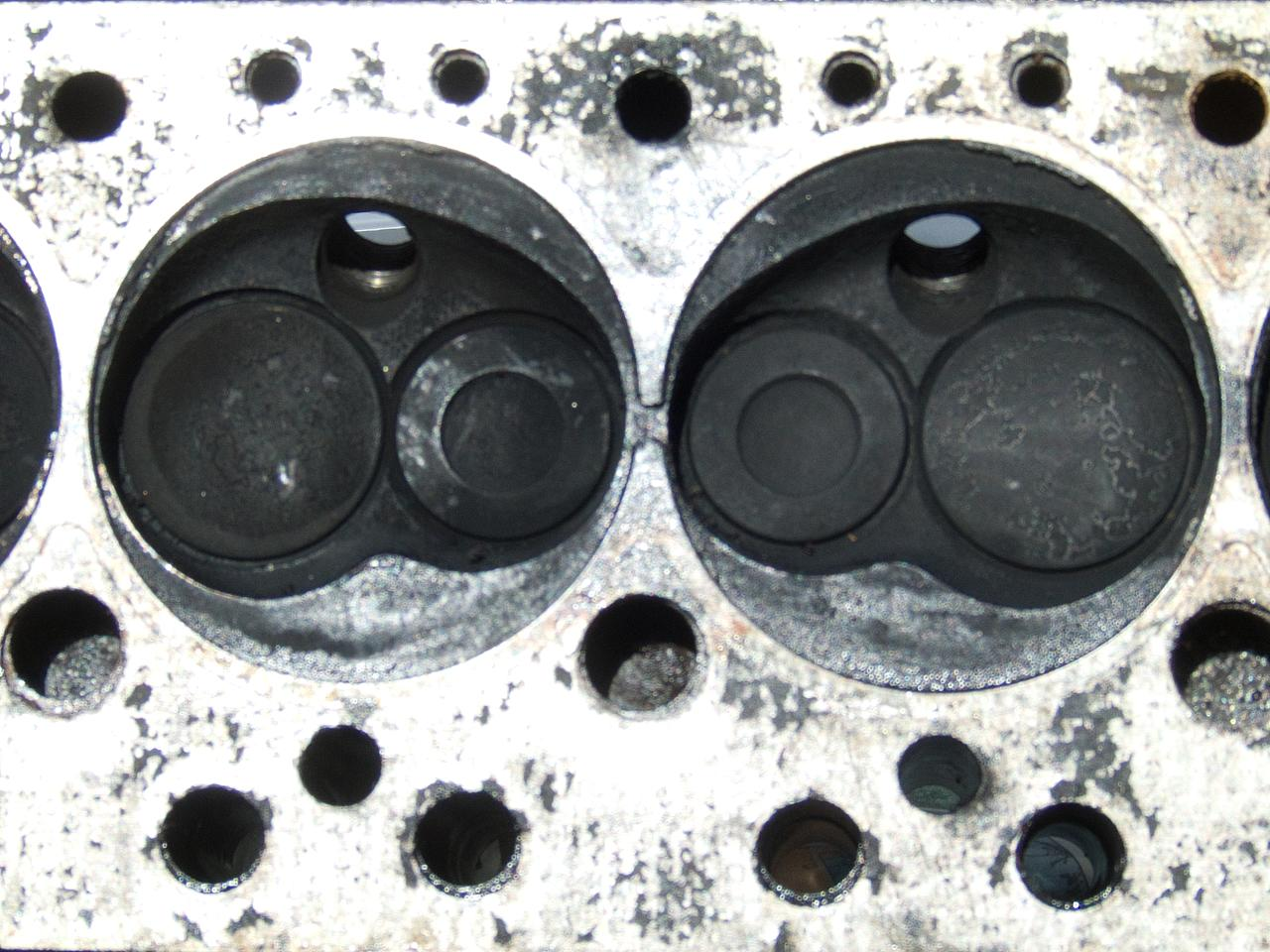
Blown head gasket at the hottest location between two siamesed cylinders

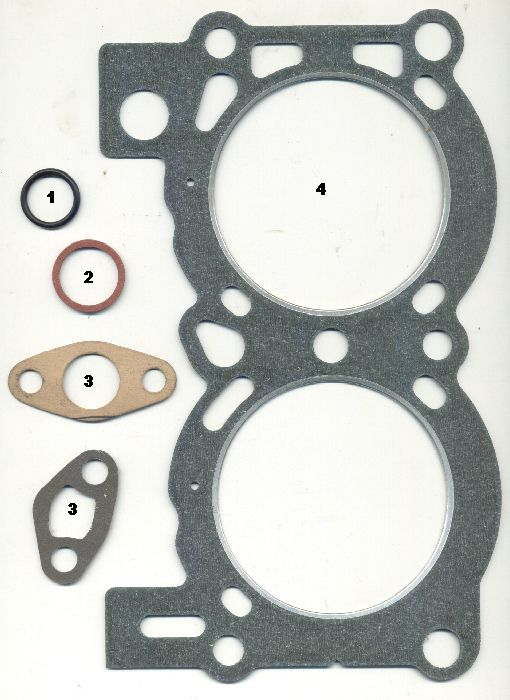
Gasket with a cooling channel between the two bores

Siamesed cylinders are engine cylinders arranged in such a way that they have no channels between them to allow water or other coolant to circulate.

Cylinders are generally arranged in this manner when the engine block is of limited size or when stability of the cylinder bores is of concern, such as in racing engines. The advantage is that the engine block will be reduced in size, or the bore can be increased in size. The disadvantage is a higher temperature between two cylinders, requiring a stronger engine block to avoid distortion of the metal, and better gasket sealing between the two bores.

== Examples ==
Examples of engines with siamesed cylinders:

- Chevrolet Stovebolt engine
- Chevrolet small-block engine (first- and second-generation)#4.125 in bore family (1970–1980)
- Oldsmobile 403 small-block V8 (1977-1979)
- Ford Godzilla engine
- Ford Racing versions of the Ford (Windsor) small block engine
- Honda B engine
- Mazda E engine
- Honda K engine
- Toyota A engine (including both performance engines like the 4A-GE and small economy engines like the 3A and 4A)
