= Hurricane Creek (Current River tributary) =

Stream in Missouri

Coordinates: 36.5256159°N 90.8067873°W

Hurricane Creek is a stream in Ripley County, Missouri, United States. It is a tributary of the Current River.

Hurricane Creek was so named on account of a hurricane (tornado) which struck the area, according to local history.

== See also ==
- List of rivers of Missouri
