= Ford Boss engine =

Ford Boss V8
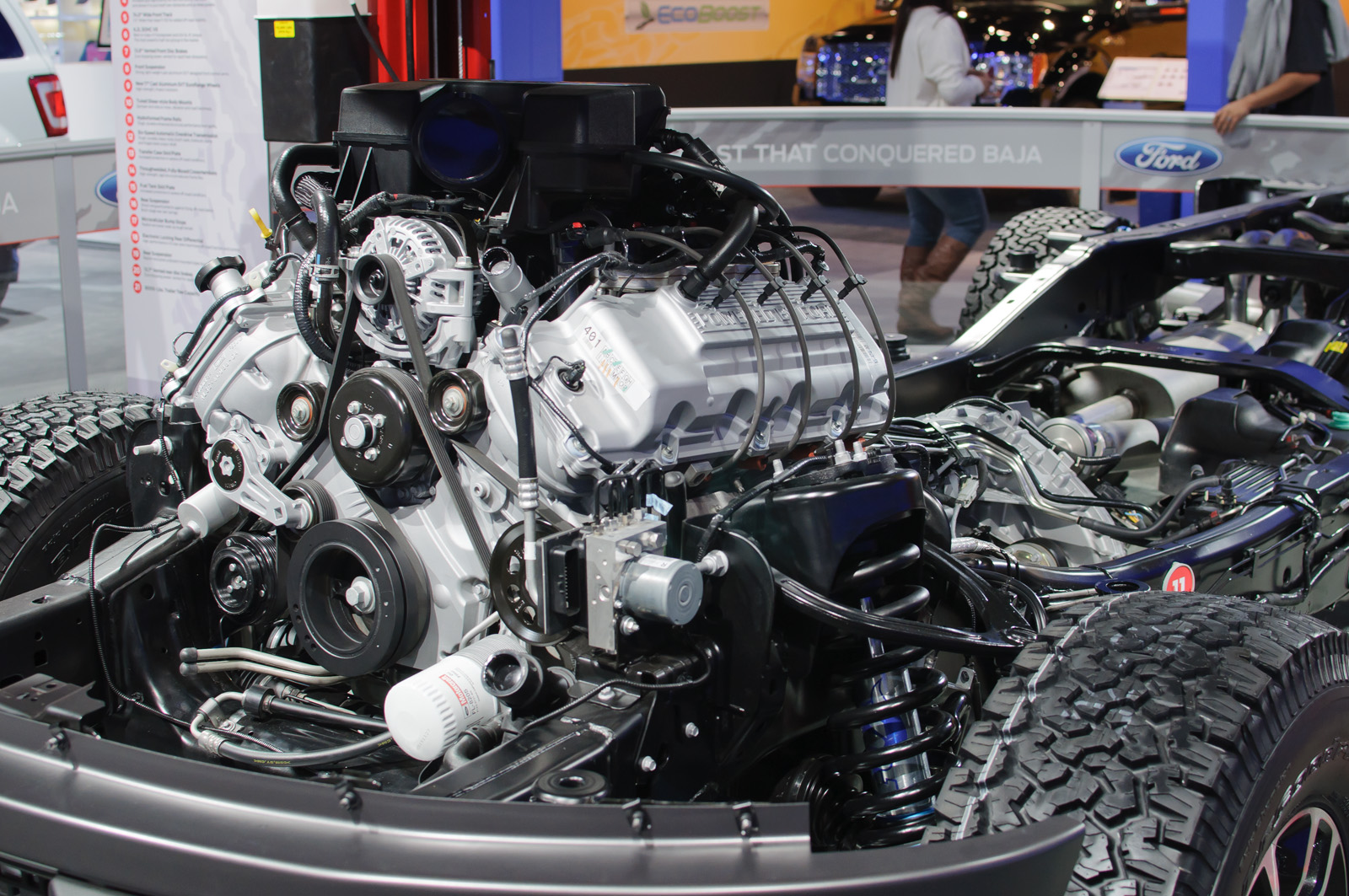
- 6.2 L Boss V8 in a Ford F-150 SVT Raptor

Overview
- Manufacturer: Ford Motor Company
- Also called: Ford Hurricane V8 (prototype only)
- Production: 2010–2022

Layout
- Configuration: Naturally aspirated 90° V8
- Displacement: 6.2 L (379 cu in)
- Cylinder bore: 4.015 in (102.0 mm)
- Piston stroke: 3.74 in (95 mm)
- Valvetrain: SOHC 2 valves per cyl. with roller rocker shafts

Combustion
- Fuel system: Fuel injection
- Fuel type: Gasoline, E85
- Cooling system: Water-cooled

Output
- Power output: 385–500 hp (287–373 kW)
- Torque output: 405–477.5 lb⋅ft (549–647 N⋅m)

Chronology
- Predecessor: Modular V8
- Successor: 6.8 L Godzilla

Boss is the internal name for a family of large-displacement V8 engines from Ford Motor Company intended to compete with Chrysler's Hemi and General Motors' 6.0 L Vortec engines. Originally named Hurricane, development of the engine was cancelled in 2005, then revived in early 2006 by Mark Fields In light of the devastation caused by Hurricane Katrina in 2005, it was renamed the Boss engine. In spite of this change, Ford did not officially market the engines with the Boss name in any production vehicle where they were used, instead referring to the engines by their displacement.

The first (and ultimately only) modern Boss engine, a 6.2 L V8, was produced at the Ford Romeo Engine Plant in Romeo, Michigan, from 2010 to the plant's closure in December 2022.

Ford Australia and Ford Performance Vehicles used the "Boss" name for V8 engines from 2002, but these were variations of the Ford Modular V8 with locally produced parts.

== 6.2 L ==
The 6.2 L (379 cu in) V8 is the main variant of the Boss engine. The V8 shares design similarities with the Modular Engine family such as a deep-skirt block with cross-bolted main caps, crankshaft-driven gerotor oil pump, overhead cam valve train arrangement, and bellhousing bolt pattern. In particular, the 6.2 L features a two-valve per cylinder SOHC valve train with roller-rocker shafts, hemispherical heads, and two spark plugs per cylinder, as well as dual-equal variable cam timing. Notably, it uses a much wider 4.53 in (115.1 mm) bore spacing (compared to the Modular's 3.937 in (100.0 mm)), allowing for the use of larger bore diameters and valves. The 6.2 L V8 has a bore diameter and stroke of 4.015 in × 3.74 in (102.0 mm × 95.0 mm). It has lightweight aluminum cylinder heads and pistons, but makes use of a cast-iron cylinder block for extra durability to meet the demands of truck use.

This V8 went into production in early 2010 and debuted in the 2010 Ford F-150 SVT Raptor as a late-availability option. A version of the Raptor from Ford Racing called the Raptor XT unveiled at the SEMA show featured a high-output version of the 6.2 L V8 with 500 hp (370 kW). Ford planned to build 50 XTs, but there is no indication they ever did. For the 2011 model year, the 6.2 L V8 was introduced in the Ford F-250 and F-350 Super Duty as a replacement for both the 5.4 L Triton V8 and the 6.8 L Triton V10, and in the F-150 as the premium engine option, though it was not available in all configurations.

For 2017, the 6.2 L V8 in the Super Duty received new tuning and modified camshafts to bump torque to 430 lb⋅ft (583 N⋅m), while power remained at 385 hp (287 kW). It was also now mated to Ford's TorqShift G 6-speed transmission; Ford's Live-Drive Power Takeoff (PTO) Provision with Mobile Mode was also optional on 6.2 L equipped trucks.

Applications:

- 2010–2014 Ford F-150 Raptor, 411 hp (306 kW) at 5500 rpm, 434 lb⋅ft (588 N⋅m) at 4500 rpm
- 2011–2014 Ford F-150, 411 hp (306 kW) at 5500 rpm, 434 lb⋅ft (588 N⋅m) at 4500 rpm
- 2011–2016 Ford F-250/F-350 Super Duty, 385 hp (287 kW) at 5500 rpm, 405 lb⋅ft (549 N⋅m) at 4500 rpm
- 2017–2022 Ford F-250/F-350 Super Duty, 385 hp (287 kW) at 5750 rpm, 430 lb⋅ft (583 N⋅m) at 3800 rpm
- 2017–2019 Ford E-350/E-450

== See also ==
- List of Ford engines
- Ford Boss 302 engine
- Ford Boss 351 engine
- Willys Hurricane engine
