= Houston Hurricanes (disambiguation) =

Houston Hurricanes may refer to:

- Houston Hurricane, (1978–1980), a North American Soccer League team
- Houston Hurricanes, (1996–2000), aUSL First Division team
- Houston Hurricanes FC, (2012–present), a National Premier Soccer League team
- Houston Hurricanes (cricket), a team in the USA's Minor League Cricket

== See also ==
- Category:Hurricanes in Houston, hurricanes that passed over Houston, Texas
