= Honda Hurricane =

Honda Hurricane may refer to:

- Honda CBR600F, a sports motorcycle known as the 'Hurricane' in the US market
- Honda CBR1000F, a sport touring motorcycle known as the "Hurricane"
