= Hurricane (painting) =

1944 painting by John Marin

- Artist: John Marin
- Year: 1944
- Type: Oil painting on canvas
- Dimensions: 64 cm × 76 cm (25 in × 30 in)
- Location: Indianapolis Museum of Art, Indianapolis

Hurricane is a 1944 oil painting by American artist John Marin, located in the Indianapolis Museum of Art, which is in Indianapolis, Indiana. He used quick brushstrokes and thickly daubed paint to depict a turbulent ocean such as he experienced near his summer home in Maine.

== Description ==
Although Marin is best known for his watercolors, beginning in the 1930s he developed an interest in the more expressive brushwork and rugged quality of oil paint. Marin was influenced by Cubism, with its flattened spaces and angularity. He honed a style of frenetic brushwork to create this dynamic image of water, wind, and clouds. He was so successful in his recreation of nature that a sailor purportedly declared it the first time he had "really seen a sea painted as the sea really is."

=== Historical information ===
Hurricane was painted the same year the Great Atlantic hurricane smashed into Maine.

=== Location history ===
Hurricane was first displayed in 1944 in the famous An American Place gallery. It was borrowed from the IMA to be part of a 1987 retrospective of Marin's work. In 2011, Hurricane was loaned out again for a traveling exhibit called "John Marin: Modernism at Midcentury," of which it was a highlight. This exhibition took it to the Portland Museum of Art in Portland, Maine; the Amon Carter Museum in Fort Worth, Texas, and the Addison Gallery of American Art in Andover, Massachusetts.

=== Acquisition ===
Caroline Marmon Fesler acquired Hurricane the same year it was painted, from Marin's long-time friend and art dealer, Alfred Stieglitz. He congratulated Fesler on her purchase, writing "The Hurricane is certainly a masterpiece, Every one agrees with every one else as to that." It was donated to the IMA as part of her estate in 1961, and was given the accession number 61.42.

== See also ==
- Tropical cyclones in popular culture
