= Operation Hurricane (disambiguation) =

Operation Hurricane may refer to:

- Operation Hurricane, the test of the first British atomic device on 3 October 1952
- Operation Hurricane (1944), a World War II 24-hour bombing operation over Germany
- Operation Hurricane (Canada), an annual month-long technical maintenance mission conducted by Canadian Forces personnel in the Canadian Arctic
- Operation Hurricane-91 (Orkan-91), 1991 Croatian Army offensive in the Croatian War of Independence
- Operation Hurricane-91 (Orkan-91), 1991 Yugoslav People's Army plan for evacuation of its forces from Split, Croatia
- Operation Hurricane II, 2004 Coalition military operation in Ramadi, Iraq
- Operation Hurricane Barbarossa, a string of militant attacks by Movement for the Emancipation of the Niger Delta
