= Hurricane Mountain (disambiguation) =

Hurricane Mountain is a mountain in the state of New York, United States.

Hurricane Mountain may also refer to:

- Hurricane Mountain (Montana), a mountain in Teton County, Montana, United States
- Hurricane Mountain (Virginia), a mountain along Virginia State Route 16 in Grayson County, Virginia, United States
