= Hurricane Lake =

Lake in Cottonwood County, Minnesota

- Location within Minnesota Location within the United States
- Location: Cottonwood County, Minnesota
- Coordinates: 44°6′29″N 95°20′11″W
- Type: lake
- Surface elevation: 1,306 feet (398 m)

Hurricane Lake is a lake in Cottonwood County, Minnesota in the U.S. state of Minnesota.

Hurricane Lake was named from a tornado which flattened trees on the lakeshore.
