= Hurricane Creek (Missouri River tributary) =

Stream in the U.S. state of Missouri

Hurricane Creek is a stream in northern Howard County in the U.S. state of Missouri. It is a tributary of the Missouri River which it enters just south of Glasgow.

The stream headwaters arise approximately one mile west of Missouri Route 5 five miles northwest of Fayette at 39°12′33″N 92°44′37″W at an altitude of 850 feet. The stream flows due west six miles passing under Missouri Route 87 about one mile south of Glasgow to its confluence with the Missouri at 39°12′26″N 92°51′14″W at an elevation of 614 feet.

Hurricane Creek was named for an incident when a tornado flattened trees in the area.

== See also ==
- List of rivers of Missouri
