= Harry Kane (disambiguation) =

Harry Kane (born 1993) is an English professional footballer.

Harry Kane may also refer to:

- Harry Kane (baseball) (1883–1932), American baseball player
- Harry Kane (hurdler) (born 1933), British hurdler
- Harry Kane (illustrator) (1912–1988), American illustrator and artist, born Harry Kirchner
- Harry Kane (politician) (1903–1962), Australian politician
- Harry Kane, character in Harold Pinter's 1961 play The Collection
- The real name of a fictional sniper from Marvel Comics, nicknamed "Hurricane"

== See also ==
- Harry P. Cain (1906–1979), US Senator from Washington state
- Harry Cane of 1667, a 17th century hurricane
