= Shelby Mustang =

High-performance variant of the Ford Mustang sports car

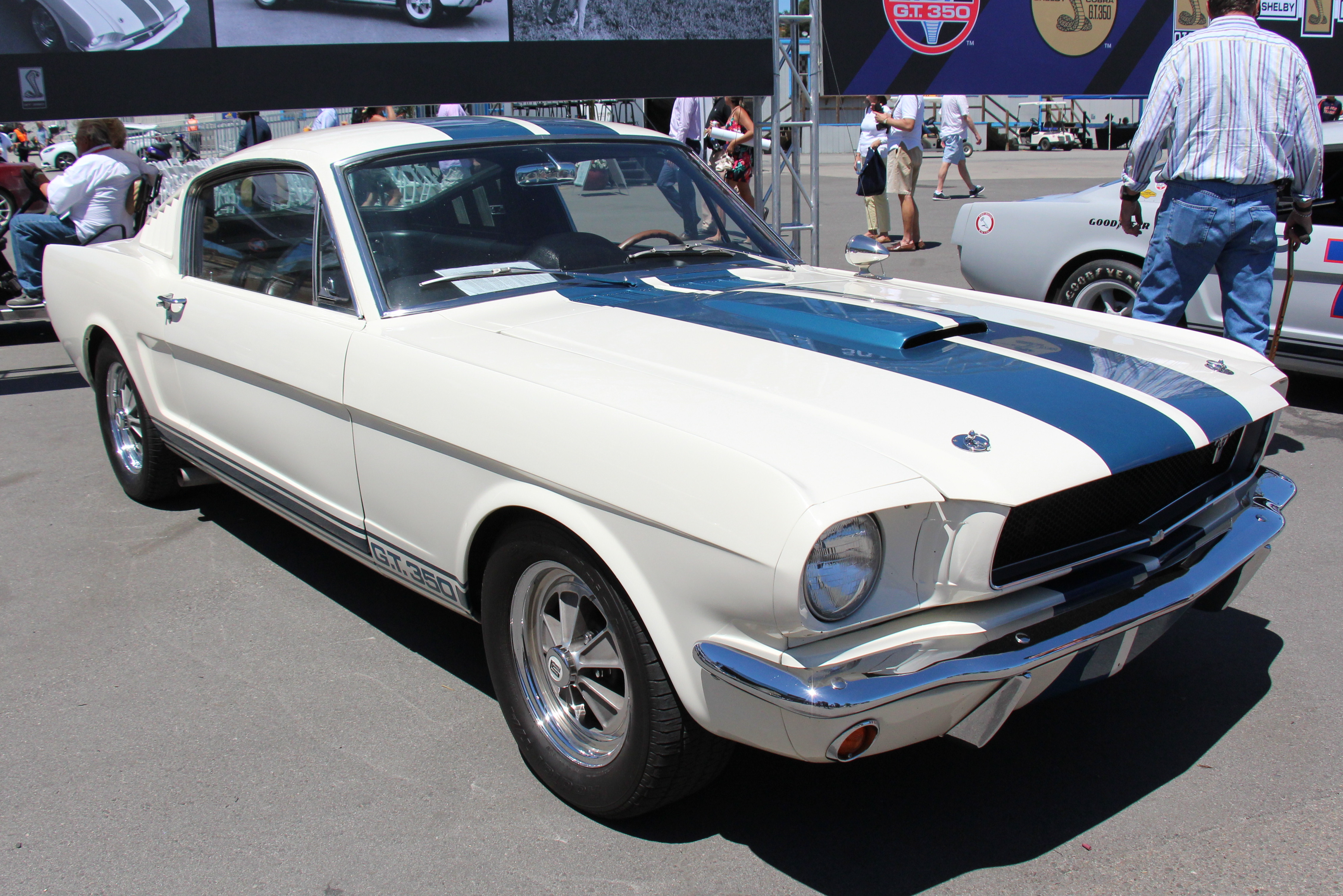
- 1965 Shelby Mustang GT350

Overview
- Manufacturer: Ford Performance; Shelby American; SVT
- Also called: Ford Mustang Shelby; Ford Shelby Mustang; Mustang Shelby; Mustang GT500; Mustang GT350; Shelby GT500 Cobra; Shelby GT350 Cobra
- Production: 1965–1971; 2005–present
- Assembly: 1965–1967, 1969–1971: United States: Los Angeles, California; 1968: United States: Ionia, Michigan; 2005–present: United States: Flat Rock, Michigan (Flat Rock Assembly Plant); Enterprise, Nevada (Shelby American)

Body and chassis
- Class: Sports car; Muscle car; Pony car
- Layout: FR layout
- Platform: Ford D2C platform: (2nd generation / 5th generation Ford Mustang); Ford S550 platform: (3rd generation / 6th generation Ford Mustang)
- Related: Ford Mustang (1st, 5th and 6th generation)

The Shelby Mustang is a high-performance variant of the Ford Mustang built by Shelby American from 1965 to 1967 and by the Ford Motor Company from 1968 to 1970.

In 2005, Ford revived the Shelby nameplate for a high-performance model of the fifth-generation Ford Mustang.

== 1st generation (1965–1970) ==
=== 1965–1966 Shelby GT350 ===
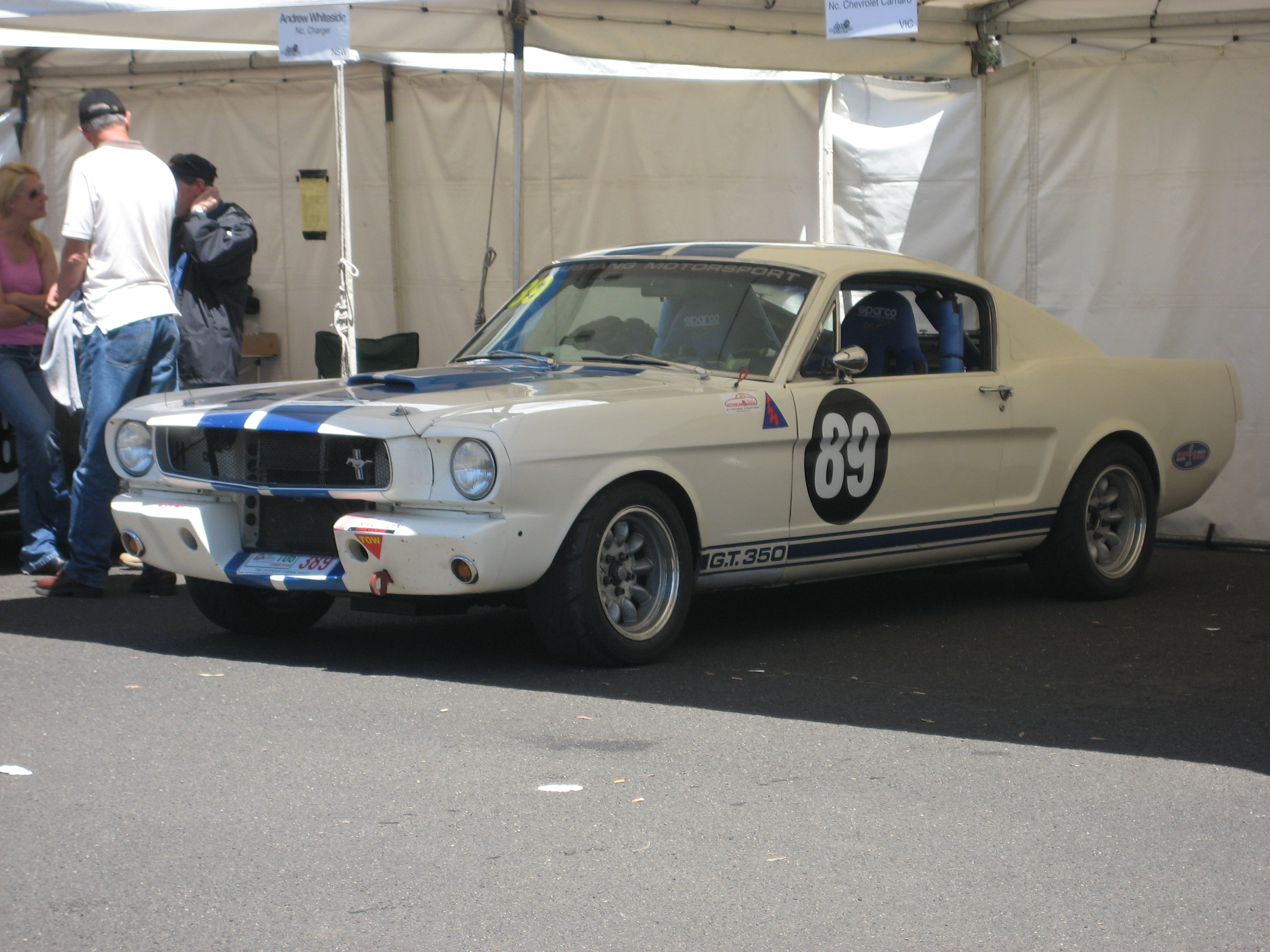
1965 GT350R

1965 Shelby Mustang GT350; 1966 Shelby GT350
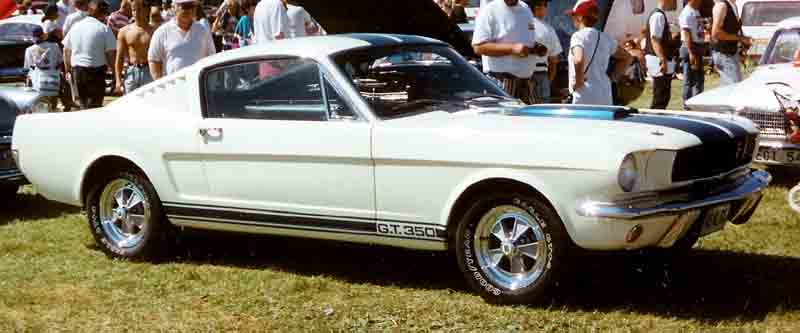
- Shelby GT350

Overview
- Production: 1965–1966
- Assembly: United States: Los Angeles, California

Body and chassis
- Body style: 2-door fastback; 2-door hardtop

Powertrain
- Engine: 289 cu in (4.7 L) Windsor K-Code V8 4-barrel carb.
- Transmission: 3-speed automatic; 4-speed manual

Dimensions
- Wheelbase: 108.0 in (2,743 mm)
- Length: 181.6 in (4,613 mm)

Chronology
- Successor: Standard: 1967 Shelby G.T.350 and 1968 Shelby Cobra GT350; 2015 Ford Shelby GT350, GT350R; GT350H: 2006–2007 Ford Shelby GT-H

The GT350 made its debut in the "sportsroof" fastback model of the first generation Ford Mustang in 1965. Produced through 1966, these were the smallest and lightest of the GT 350 models. Work started at Shelby American when its Ford-powered AC Ace-based, two-seat, 289 AC Cobra sports car production was wrapping up, and the 427 cu in variant was beginning. Both the AC and the Shelby Mustang use the Cobra emblem, a similar paint scheme, and the optional "Cobra" valve covers installed on many GT350s that were part of a marketing tie-in by Shelby, as well as one of his iconic symbols. All 1965–66 cars had the Windsor 289 cu in (4.7 L) HiPo K-Code 271 hp (202 kW; 275 PS) V8 engine, modified with a large 4-barrel Holley 725 CFM carburetor to produce 306 bhp (310 PS; 228 kW) at 6,000 rpm and 329 lb⋅ft (446 N⋅m) of torque at 4,200 rpm. Marketing literature referred to this engine as the "Cobra hi-riser" due to its high-rise intake manifold. Beginning as a stock Mustang with a 4-speed manual transmission and 9-inch live rear axle, the cars were shipped to Shelby American, where they received the high-rise manifolds, Tri-Y headers, and were given larger Ford Galaxie rear drum brakes with metallic-linings and Kelsey-Hayes front disc brakes.

The 1965 GT350 was built for the race track, not comfort or ease of driving. A total of 34 race-spec "GT350R" cars were built specifically for competition use under SCCA rules, and the model was the B-Production champion for three straight years. The 1966 GT350 was more comfortable for casual drivers, including a rear seat, optional colors, and an optional automatic transmission. This trend for more options and luxuries continued in the following years, with the cars becoming progressively larger, heavier, and more comfortable, at the cost of their competitiveness. By 1969 Carroll Shelby was no longer involved in the Shelby GT program, and the design was done in-house by Ford, with the 1969 GT350s and GT500s reduced to being largely styling modifications to a stock Mustang.

The 1965 and 1966 GT350s were delivered from Ford's San Jose Assembly Plant for modification by Shelby, originally in Venice Beach and later at Los Angeles International Airport. San Jose cars carried an "R" in the Ford VIN denoting that facility. The only year that Shelby Mustangs from the 1960s came from another plant was 1968, where they came from New Jersey, "T" in the VIN, and were modified by A.O. Smith.

==== 1965 GT350 ====
All 1965 GT350s were painted in Wimbledon White with Guardsman Blue rocker stripes. Approximately 28% of the 562 1965 cars built were delivered to the dealer with the optional Le Mans stripes, a pair of broad matching blue stripes that run the length of the entire car from the hood through the roof and the tail. Today, it is difficult to find a GT350 without them. In subsequent years, white stripes were also used with dark colored body paint.

Many early 1965 cars had the battery relocated to the trunk, which was changed mid-year due to complaints of fumes, and had over-rider traction bars, relocated A-arms, as well as other modifications. A 4-speed Borg-Warner T10 manual was the only transmission available. Dual exhausts exited out the sides via glasspack mufflers (with fourteen cars being equipped with rear-exiting exhausts to meet state regulations for sales in certain areas). For this one year, the GT350 also had special 130 mph (210 km/h)-rated Goodyear "Blue Dot" tires, named for the prominent blue dot on each sidewall. The 1965 GT350 had a full-size spare tire mounted in place of rear seats, making it a 2-seat-only vehicle (to qualify as a "sports car" under SCCA regulations), and rode on either silver-painted steel wheels or special cast-magnesium center "Cragar Shelby" 15-inch rims with chromed center caps marked with a stylized "CS". Total 1965 model year production was 562 units.

==== 1966 GT350 ====
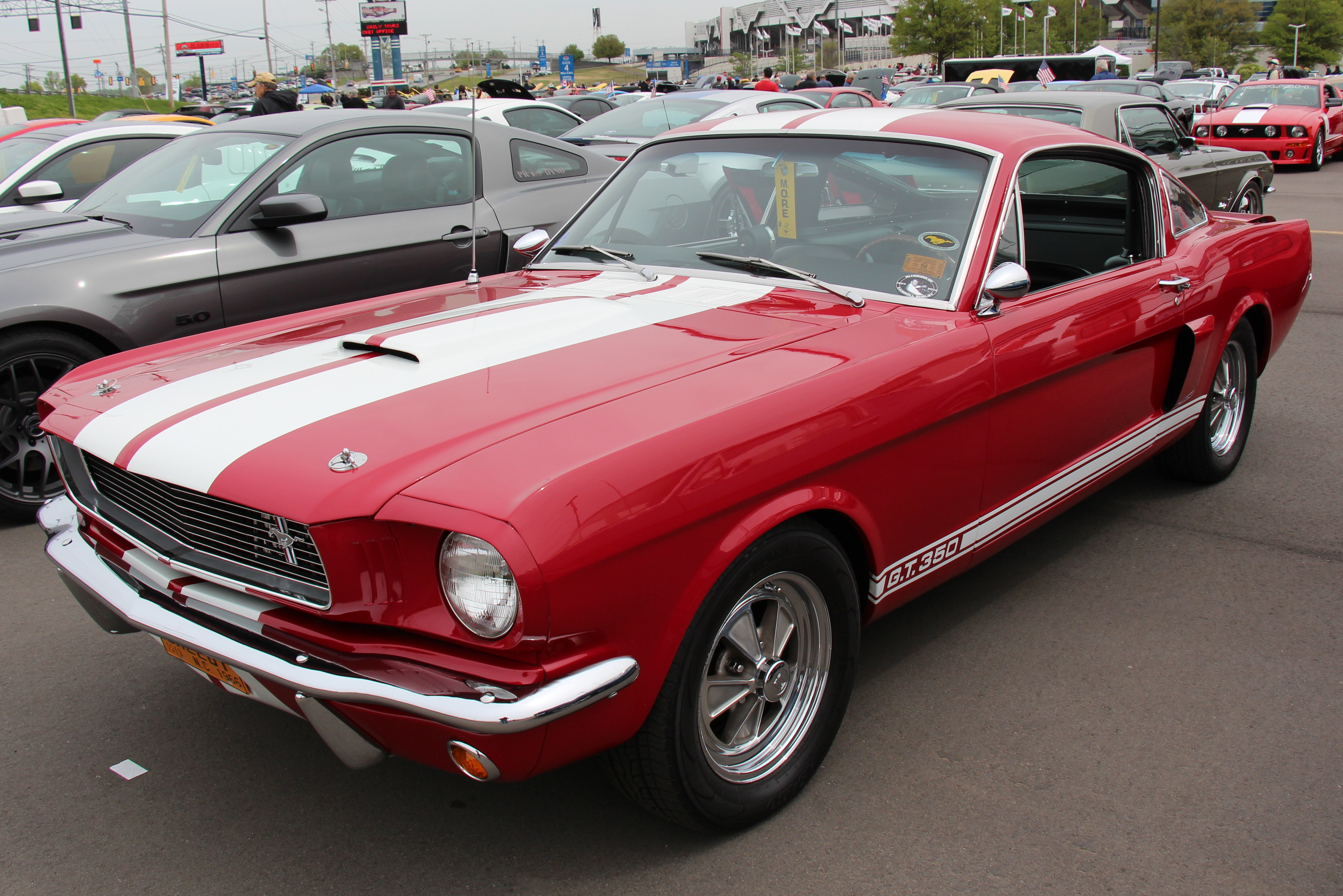
1966 Shelby GT350

For 1966, the GT350 lost its Mustang tag and was marketed simply as the Shelby GT350. The new model year also saw the introduction of non-white colors, including blue, red, green, and black. Other changes included special rear quarter-panel windows replacing the factory extractor vents, functional brake scoops on each side, and optional SelectShift 3-speed automatic, as well as an optional Paxton supercharger. The battery was no longer relocated to the trunk for 1966, and the over-rider traction bars were discontinued. The normal factory fold-down rear seat was optional. While early 1965 cars had black engine blocks, 1966 and later engines were painted regular factory Ford dark blue. The 1966 models came with a dual-exhaust exiting in the rear.

The first 252 GT350s for 1966 began as 1965 Mustang K-Code Fastbacks that had been specifically ordered by Shelby American for conversion into 1966 GT350s; these all had 1965 bodies. They were received in blocks of cars; thus Shelby VINs do not correspond in numerical order to Ford factory VINs.

As a promotional move, Ford leveraged its role as the major shareholder of Hertz to persuade the rental car giant to purchase 1,003 fastbacks, including two prototypes. Four "experimental" GT350 convertibles were also built for test purposes in anticipation of a 1967-1/2 convertible offering. A small number of the consumer sales 1966 models were factory fitted with Paxton superchargers, but not the No-Spin limited-slip differential, for an additional $670, (~$6,648 in 2025) the engine was rated at 440 hp (328 kW). Total production for 1966 was 2,378 units, including two prototypes and four drag cars, with 1,372 sold to the general public.

==== 1966 Hertz Shelby GT350 ====
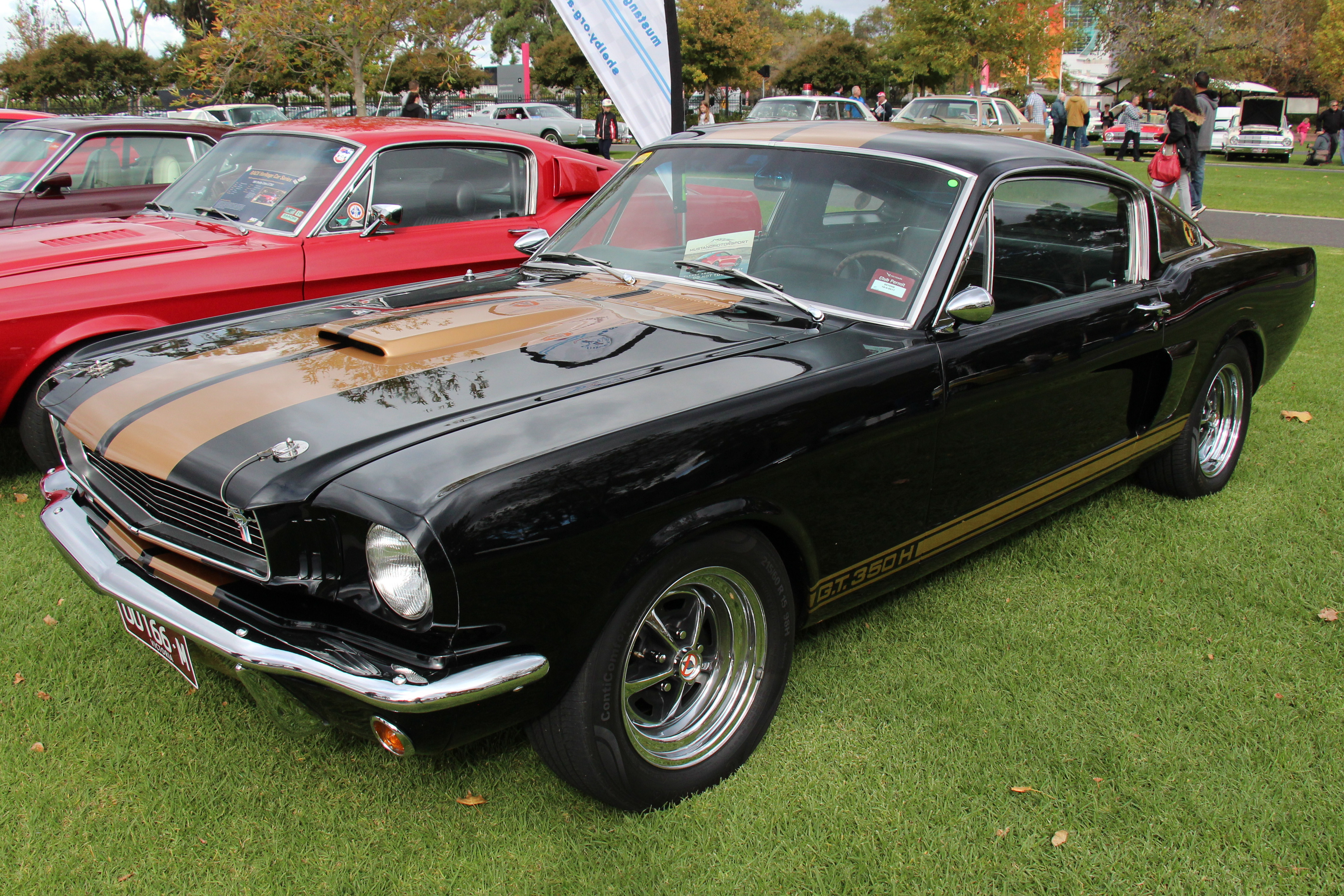
1966 Shelby GT350-H

The sales arrangement with Hertz for ~1,000 GT350s to be added to its rental fleet included the proviso that after their rental lives were finished the cars would be returned to Ford, refurbished, and sold to the public as "GT350H" models. Most Hertz cars were black with gold racing stripes and rocker panel stripes, although a few were white with blue stripes. The first 85 Hertz cars were available with four-speed manual transmissions and Hertz advertised them as "Rent-a-Racer" cars. During rental, these cars were sometimes used as production class cars at SCCA events, and were rumored to have been returned to Hertz with evidence of roll bars being welded in. Ford provided another 800 models to Hertz with black paint, gold stripes and black interior, as well as automatic transmissions.

When the Hertz cars were returned to Ford to be prepared for sale to the public, high-performance racing parts were often "lost" before final sale.

=== 1967–1968 Shelby GT350 / GT500 ===
For 1967, the GT350 carried over the K-Code high performance 289 with a 'COBRA' aluminum valve cover. The GT500 was added to the lineup, equipped with a 428 cu in (7.0 L) Interceptor V8 engine with two 600 CFM Holley four-barrel carburetors mated to a mid-rise aluminum intake manifold.

Documented plans to introduce a convertible mid-production year were shelved due to supply, production and financial problems that happened as soon as the first cars started to arrive at Shelby's Los Angeles facility in September. By October 1966, Ford took control of engineering and purchasing. A.O. Smith was tapped to fix the fitting of fiberglass components. In May 1967 the decision was made to terminate the California-based Shelby operation. On August 18, 1967, a small carryover Shelby staff, along with the remaining engineering cars, was sent to Ionia, Michigan; Shelby personnel had substantially less involvement after this time.

Notable cars for 1967 include 0100, 0131 and 0139, the first big block Shelby GT cars ordered and built:

- 0100, the first GT500.
- 0131, the only Shelby GT coupe built ("Little Red'), which was the precursor to the '68 California Special. The original GT500 "L'il Red" was rediscovered in a Texas farm field in March 2018
- 0139, the only Shelby GT500 convertible built (in 1967).
- One 1967 Fastback was updated to a GT500 equipped with a 427 FE GT40 racing engine producing 650 hp (485 kW), and was known as the "Super Snake" The car was capable of speeds over 150 mph (241 km/h); hitting 170 mph (274 km/h) during a demonstration (by Shelby himself) of Goodyear's Thunderbolt tires. No cars other than the prototype were built due to limited interest. The car sold at Mecum's 2013 Indianapolis auction for $1.3 million.

In 1967, Shelby American built 26 K-code Mustang Coupes to the FIA's Group 2 specification. This allowed the cars to race in the SCCA A-Sedan class and the Trans Am series. The 1967 Mustang notchback Group II sedan was Shelby American's competition model for 1967. The same rule that allowed the 1965 GT350 to compete in SCCA's B Production class – no rear seats – effectively kept the Shelby Mustangs out of the Trans-Am series.

For 1968, the Cobra name was applied to both models, which were marketed as the Shelby Cobra GT350 and the Shelby Cobra GT 500. The solid lifter K-code engine was discontinued by Ford, so Shelby used the hydraulic lifter 230 hp 302. It produced 250 HP with the high rise intake but was not equipped with Shelby headers in order to make room for power steering. The early 1968 GT500 used the Shelby installed 428 Police Interceptor with a single four-barrel carburetor rated at 360 HP.

==== 1967 Shelby GT350 and 1968 Cobra GT350 ====
1967 Shelby GT350; 1968 Shelby Cobra GT350
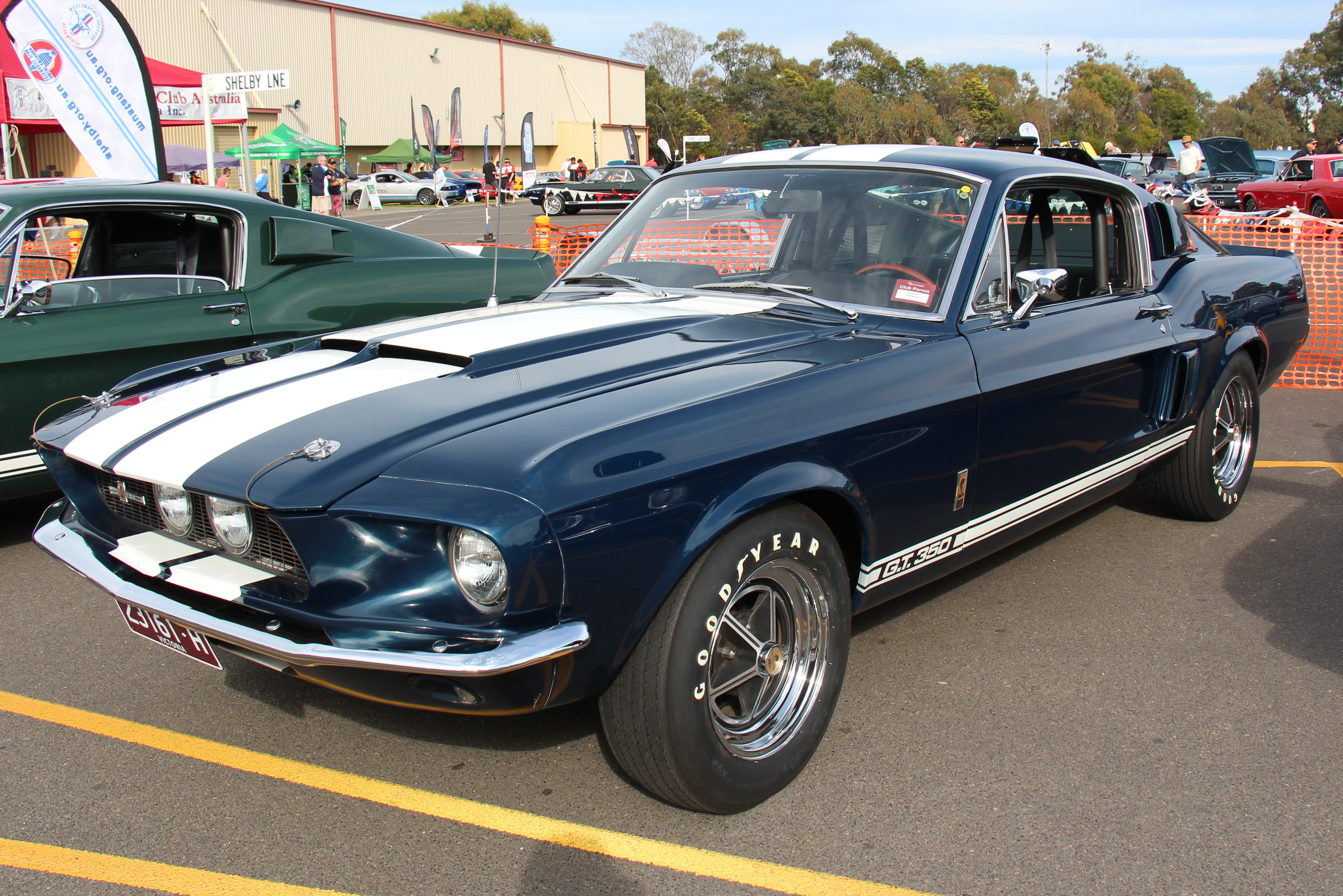
- 1967 Shelby Mustang GT350 Fastback

Overview
- Production: 1967–1968
- Model years: 1967–1968
- Assembly: 1967: United States: Los Angeles, California; 1968: United States: Ionia, Michigan
- Designer: Charles McHose (1967)

Body and chassis
- Body style: 2-door fastback; 2-door convertible

Powertrain
- Engine: 1967 289 cu in (4.7 L) Windsor V8; 1968 302 cu in (4.9 L) Windsor V8
- Transmission: 3-speed automatic; 4-speed manual

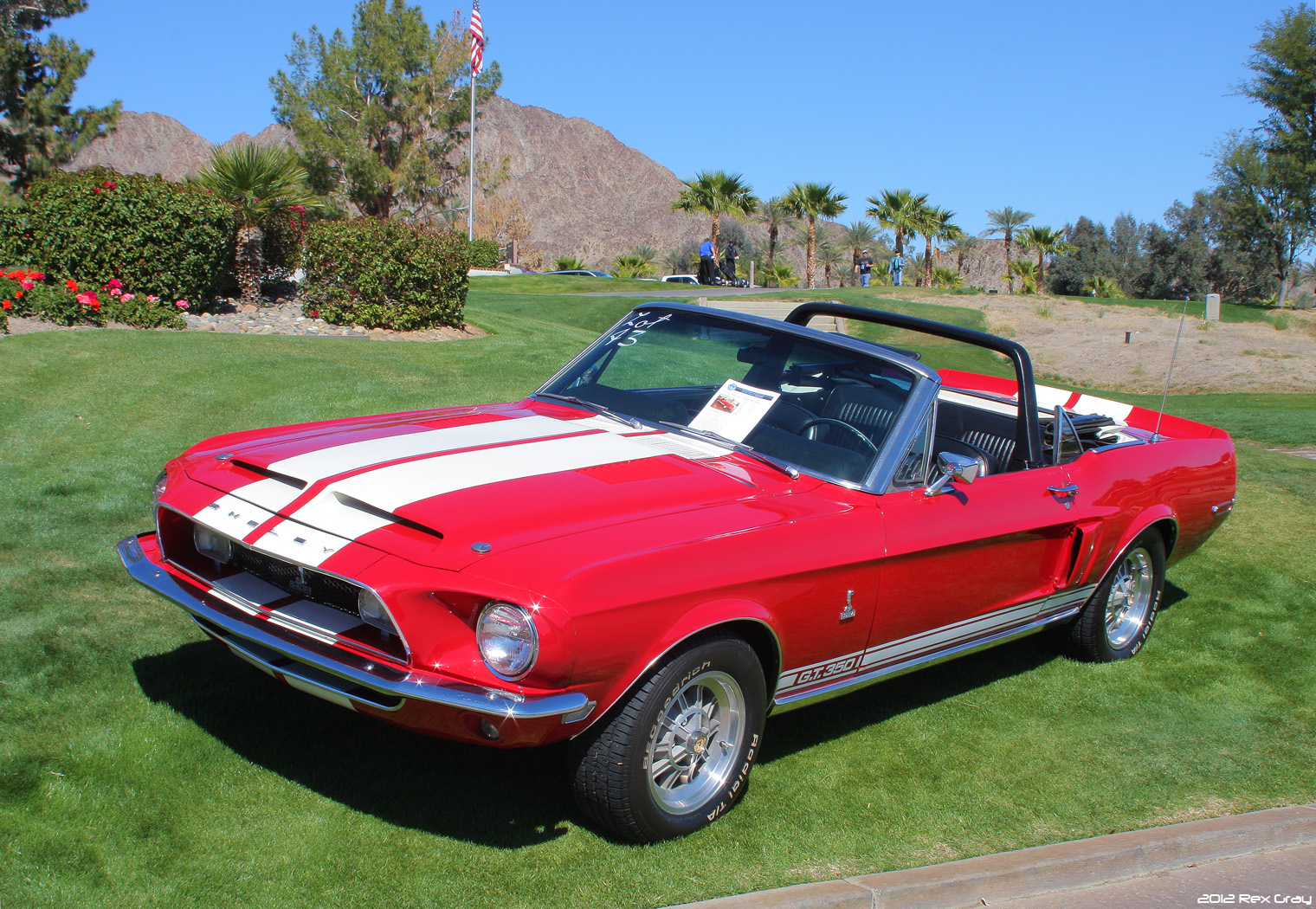
1968 Shelby GT350 convertible

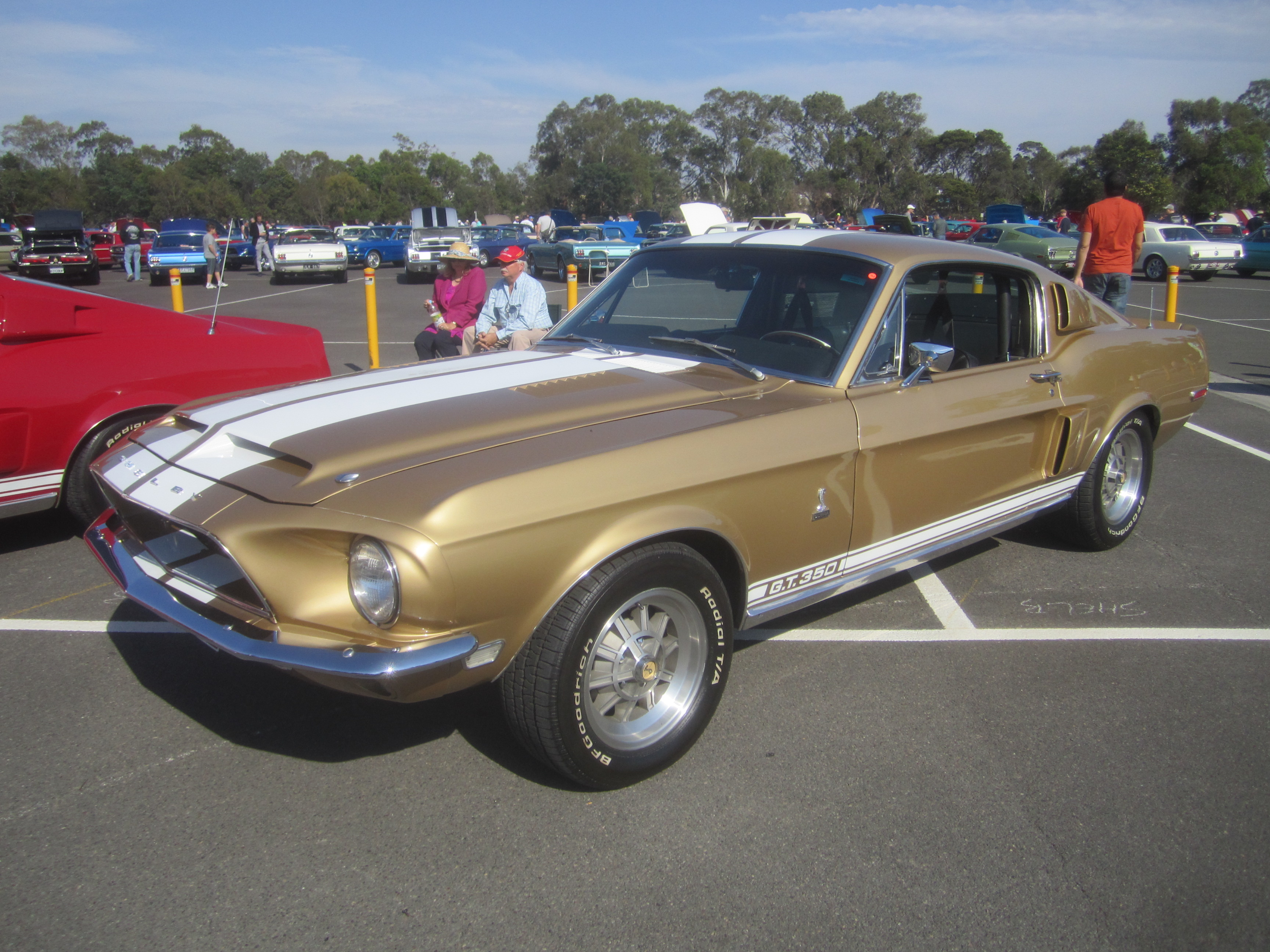
1968 Shelby GT350 Fastback

The 1967 redesign made for a heavier Mustang, along with a longer, fiberglass hood, and new front and rear fascias. The design of the original 1965 version was evident, but these styling upgrades gave the car a more aggressive appearance and achieved Carroll Shelby's goal of differentiating his car from the Mustang on which it was based. The separate high-beam headlamps in the grille added more character, while a thin, chrome front bumper sat below a mesh grille with the classic "Shelby GT350" logo in place (except for the very early cars). The small hood scoop was there to deliver fresh air to the engine. Shelby also included new, horizontal sequential taillights (sourced from a '67 Cougar in 1967 and a '65 Thunderbird in 1968) and an integrated Kamm-type rear spoiler. Functional rear brake-cooling scoops adorned the rear quarter panels. Ten-spoke, fifteen-inch, cast-aluminum rims were the wheel choice with Goodyear white-lettered radials.

The GT350 was available with air conditioning and an AM/FM radio. The steering wheel was a wood-rimmed and satin-trimmed design with the classic Shelby logo in the center. Behind this wheel was a set of gauges. A 140-mph speedometer and a 8,000-rpm tachometer were joined along with a smaller analog clock, fuel level, water temperature, and oil pressure gauges.

The 1967 GT350 came with an iron-block, 289-cubic-inch (4.7-liter) V-8 rated at 306 horsepower and 329 lb-foot of torque. For a pushrod design, the GT350 revved relatively high, with the horsepower peak not in full swing until the 6,000-rpm redline. 1967 was well before modern fuel injection came about, and the car used a single Holley four-barrel carburetor. The true dual-exhaust with H-shaped crossover system came standard with low restriction mufflers and chrome exhaust tips. Power was routed to the ground through a sturdy, four-speed manual transmission with a single, dry-disc clutch. A three-speed automatic was made available as an option. Rear-end ratios were 3.89-to-1 for the four-speed manual and 3.50-to-1 for the automatic. Acceleration was impressive, with a 0-to-60 time of around seven seconds and a top speed of 140 miles per hour (230 km/h). Braking duties were handled by 11.3-inch discs up front and drums in the rear. Power assist was standard. The front suspension consisted of unequal-length control arms, coil springs, adjustable tube arms, and an anti-sway bar. Out back was a live axle, with multi-leaf, semi-elliptical springs and tube shocks. The steering was a power-assisted recirculating ball design.

In 1968, the 289ci V8 was replaced with a factory 302 V8 using an aluminum Cobra intake manifold and Holley 600 cfm carb. The 302 had less racing parts than the 289 and was rated at 250 hp. A Paxton Supercharger was available. Shelby American designer John Chun is said to have helped design the 1968 and 1969 models.

==== 1967 Shelby GT500 and 1968 Cobra GT500 ====
1967 Shelby GT500; 1968 Shelby Cobra GT500
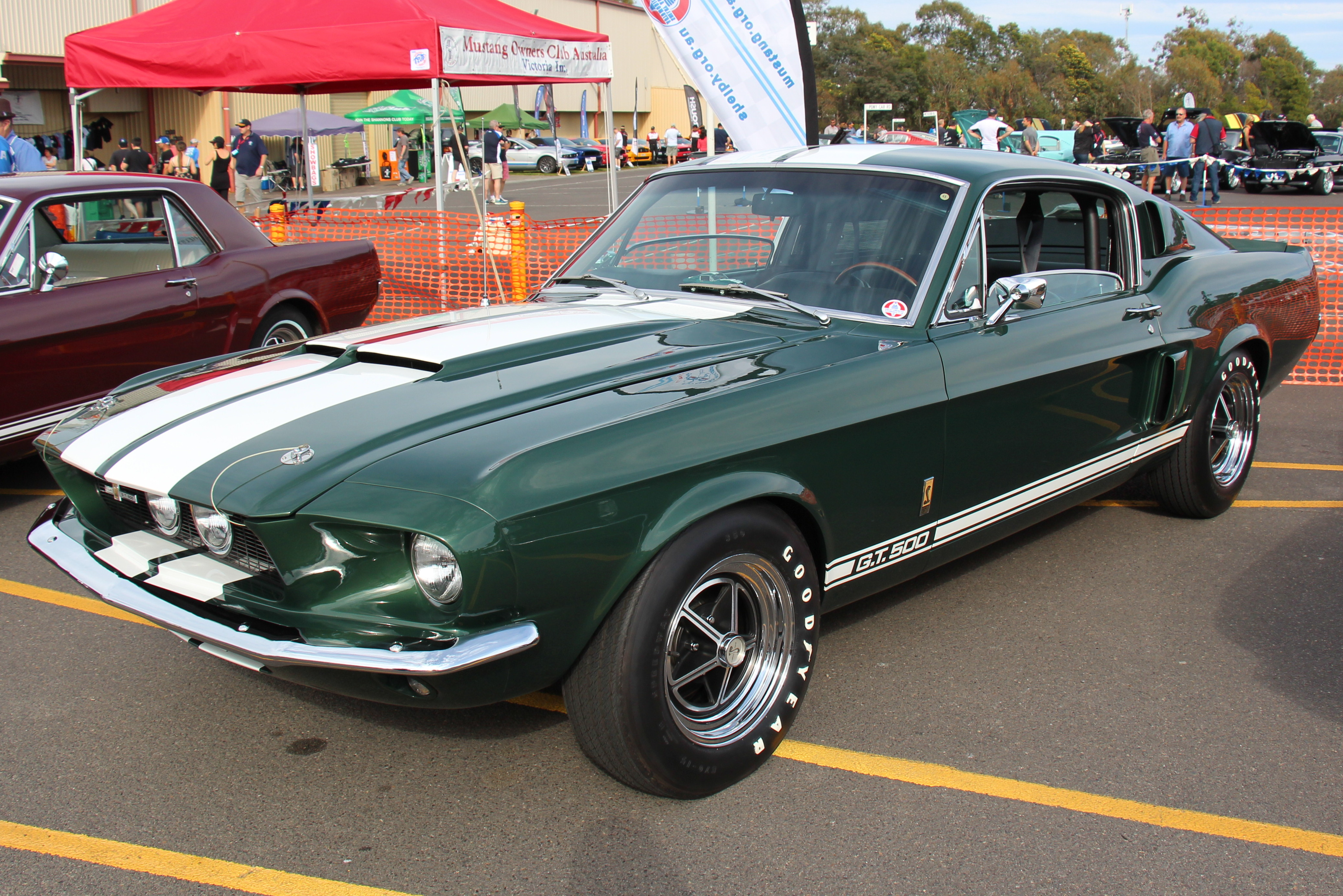
- 1967 Shelby Mustang GT500 Fastback

Overview
- Production: 1967–1968
- Assembly: 1967: United States: Los Angeles, California; 1968: United States: Ionia, Michigan
- Designer: Charles McHose (1967)

Body and chassis
- Body style: 2-door fastback; 2-door convertible

Powertrain
- Engine: 428 cu in (7.0 L) V8; 428 cu in (7.0 L) Cobra Jet V8
- Transmission: 3-speed automatic; 4-speed manual

Dimensions
- Curb weight: 1,470 kg (3,241 lb)

Chronology
- Successor: 1968 GT500KR: 2008–2009 Ford Shelby GT500KR

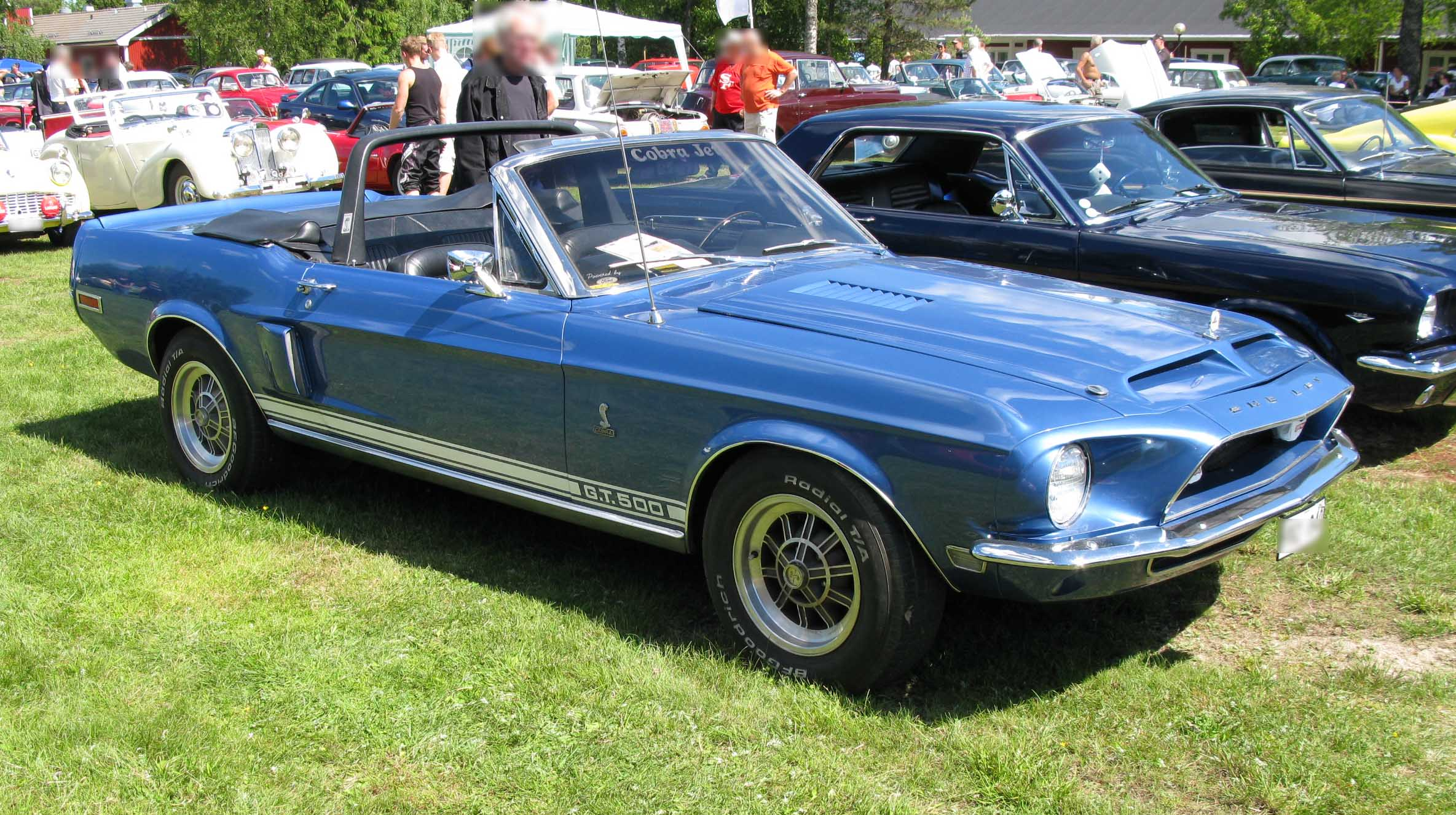
1968 Shelby GT500 convertible

The 1967 Shelby G.T. 500 was the first model built in the Shelby G.T. 500 range. It is based on the 1967 Mustang and is equipped with a FE 428 cu in (7.0 L) Police-Interceptor V8 engine topped with an aluminum mid-rise intake and 2X4-barrel 600 CFM Holley carburetors producing 355 bhp (360 PS; 265 kW) at 5,400 rpm and 420 lb⋅ft (569 N⋅m) at 3200 rpm of torque. Two thousand forty eight were produced in 1967.

Several body parts of the G.T. were made of fiberglass including the front-end, hood, rear tail light panel, deck lid, quarter panel extension, and side scoops.

==== 1968 GT500KR ====
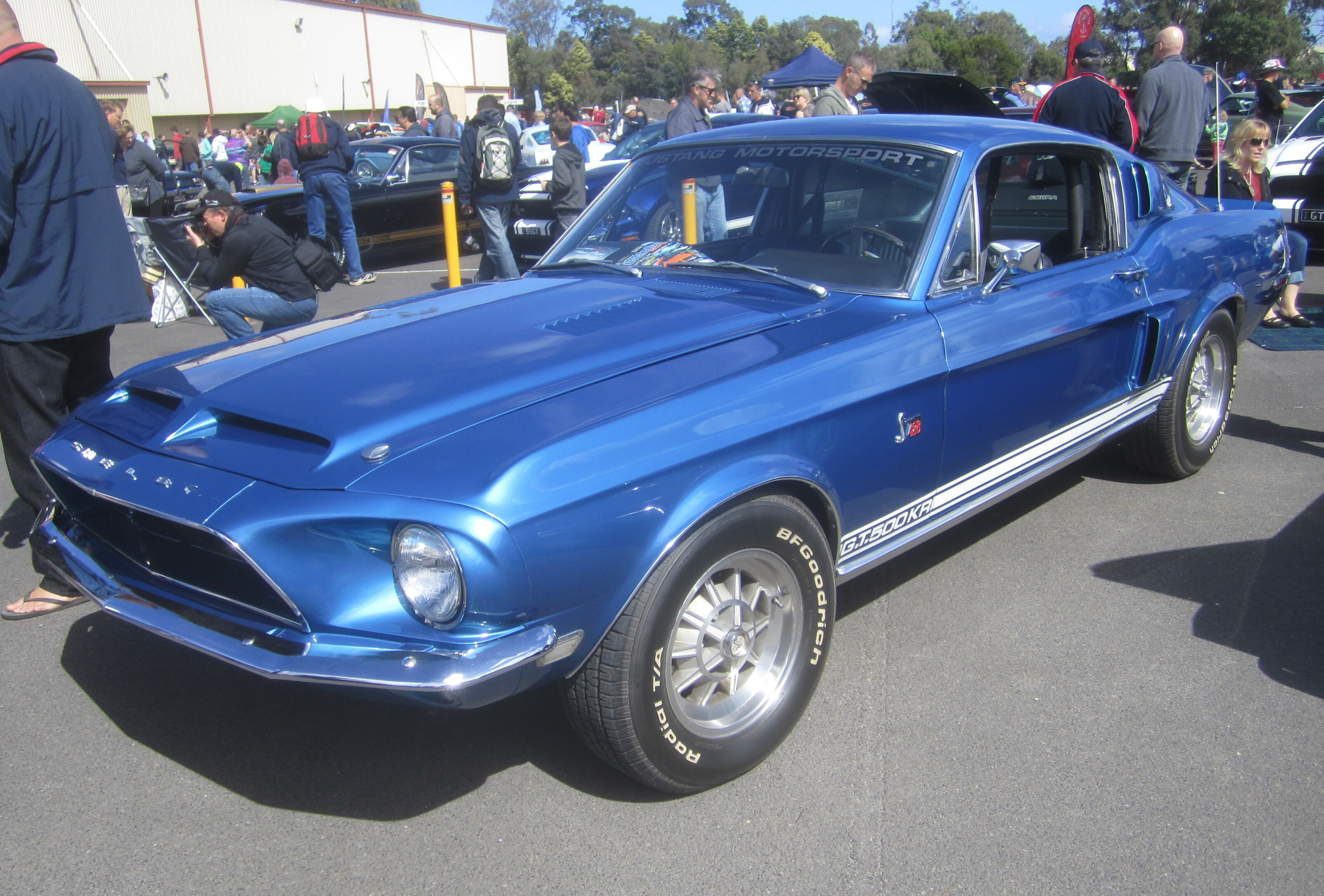
1968 Shelby GT500KR Fastback

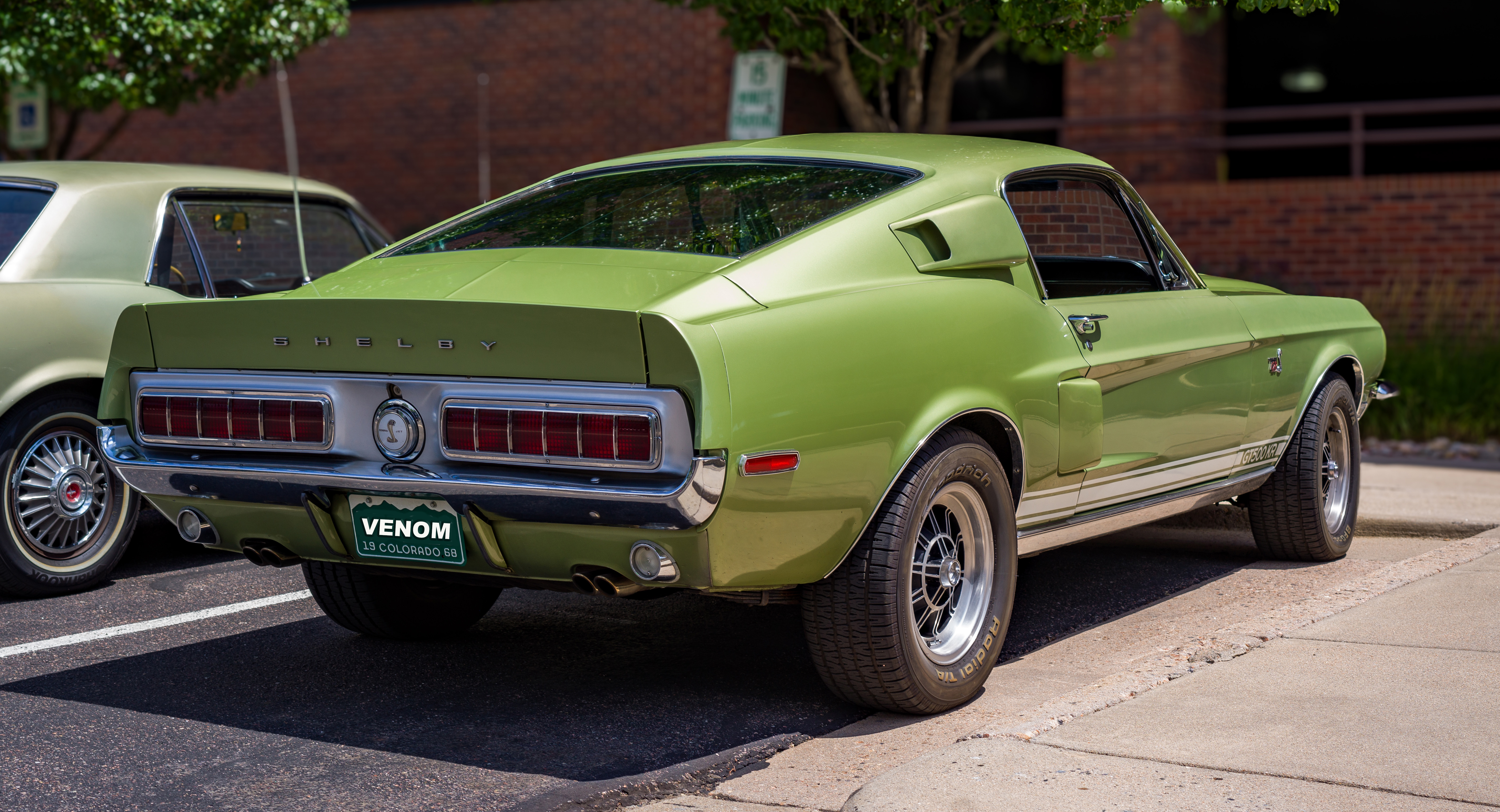
1968 Shelby GT500KR in Lime Gold Metallic

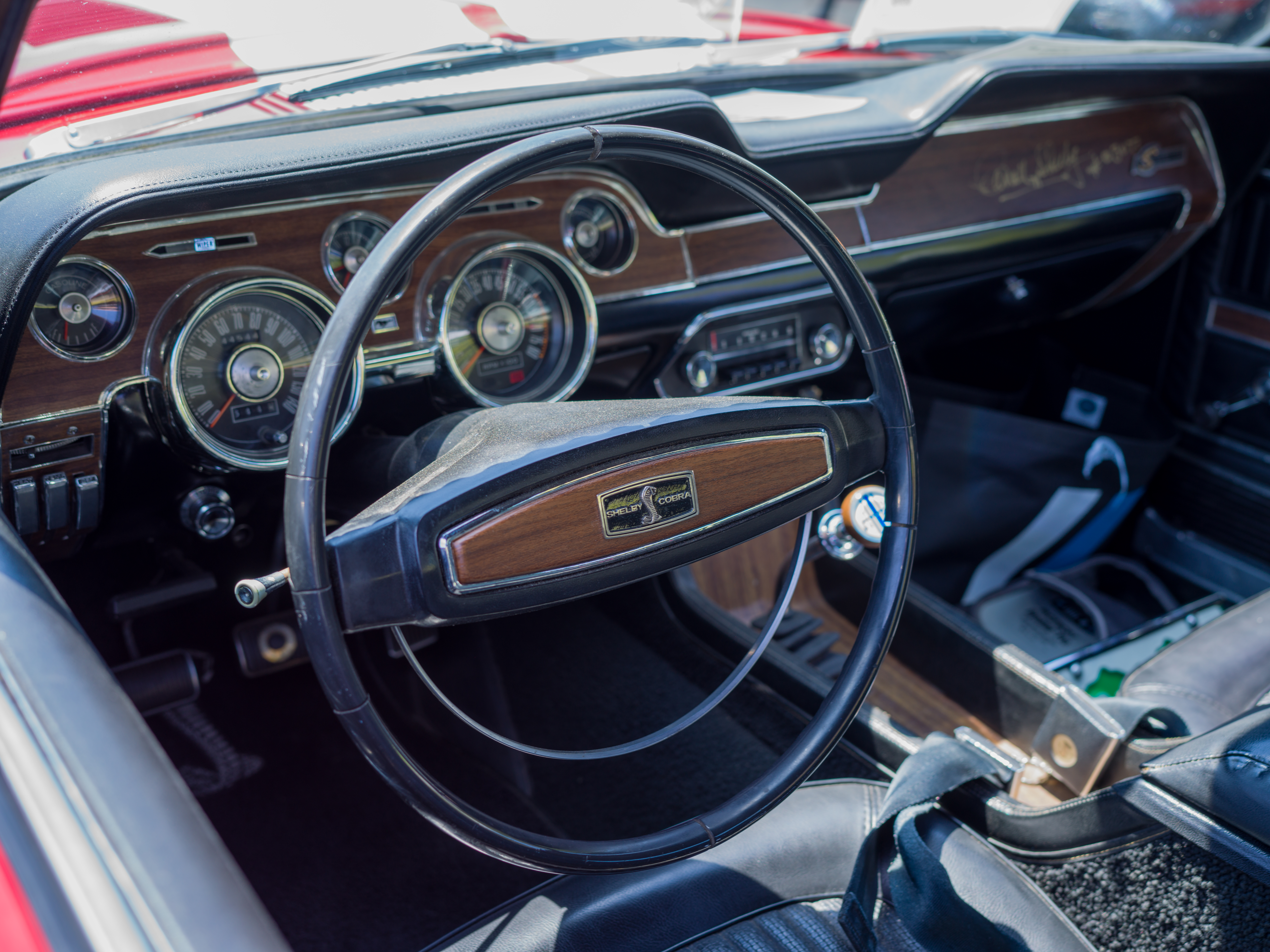
Interior of a 1968 Shelby, featuring visible full gauges and top loader 4-speed transmission

Beginning in April 1968, Ford began factory installing a version of the 428 engine known as the Cobra Jet. This new engine featured a unique, 16-bolt exhaust flange. The GT500 was subsequently known as The Cobra GT500 KR. The initials KR stood for "King of the Road." Ford rated the Cobra jet at 335 hp (250 kW), but with 440 lb⋅ft (597 N⋅m) of torque at 3,400 rpm, although the horsepower was considered significantly underreported. Shelby's KR engine was left stock adding die-cast aluminum valve covers with "Cobra Lemans" to note Ford's FE engine family victory over Ferrari at Le Mans in 1966 and 1967.

=== 1969–1970 GT350 / GT500 ===
1969–1970 GT350 and GT500
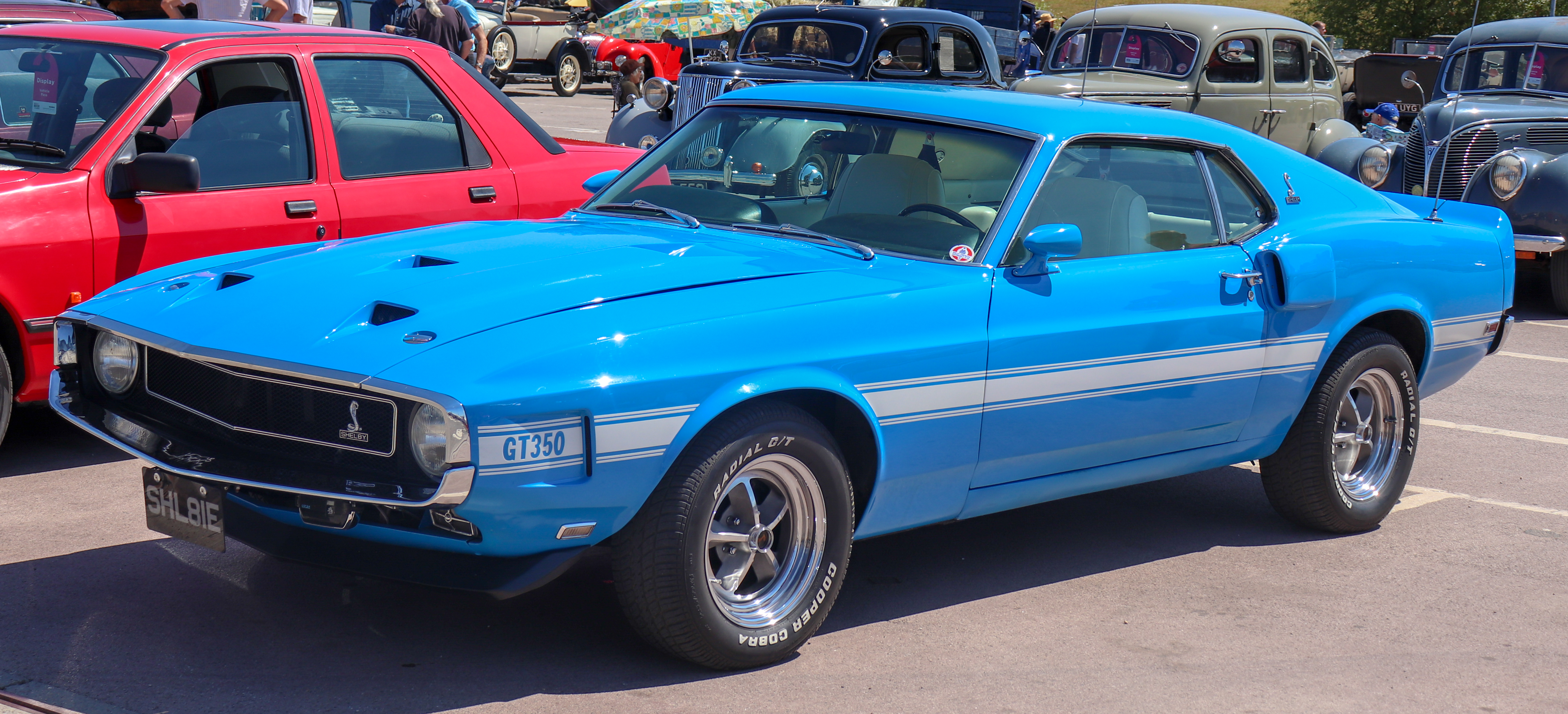
- 1969 Shelby GT350 Fastback

Overview
- Production: 1969–1970
- Assembly: United States: Los Angeles, California

Body and chassis
- Body style: 2-door fastback; 2-door convertible

Powertrain
- Engine: 351 cu in (5.8 L) Windsor V8 (GT 350); 428 cu in (7.0 L) FE V8 (GT 500)
- Transmission: 3-speed automatic; 4-speed manual

Dimensions
- Wheelbase: 108.0 in (2,743 mm)
- Length: 191.0 in (4,851 mm)

The GTs lost their Cobra tag for 1969, and once again were marketed simply as the Shelby GT350 and Shelby GT500. The GT350 and GT500 for the 1969 model year received an extensive face lift, the body alone increasing in length by 4 inches (100 mm) with some reaching 10 inches (250 mm). Ford was involved with design and style decisions, with Shelby having little input. The GT350 was now equipped with a 351 cubic-inch V8. Carroll Shelby terminated his agreement with Ford in the summer of 1969.

No production of 1970 Shelby GT350 and 500 models was undertaken; however, unsold 1969 models were given 1970 vehicle identification numbers under FBI supervision. The 1970 models had two cosmetic changes, a front chin spoiler and two black hood stripes. The rest of the changes had to do with emissions. The GT500 had the carburetor modified and marked "ed" (edited) on tag. The distributor in both the GT 350 and GT500 was changed to a 1970 version. A total of 789 were re-VIN'd.

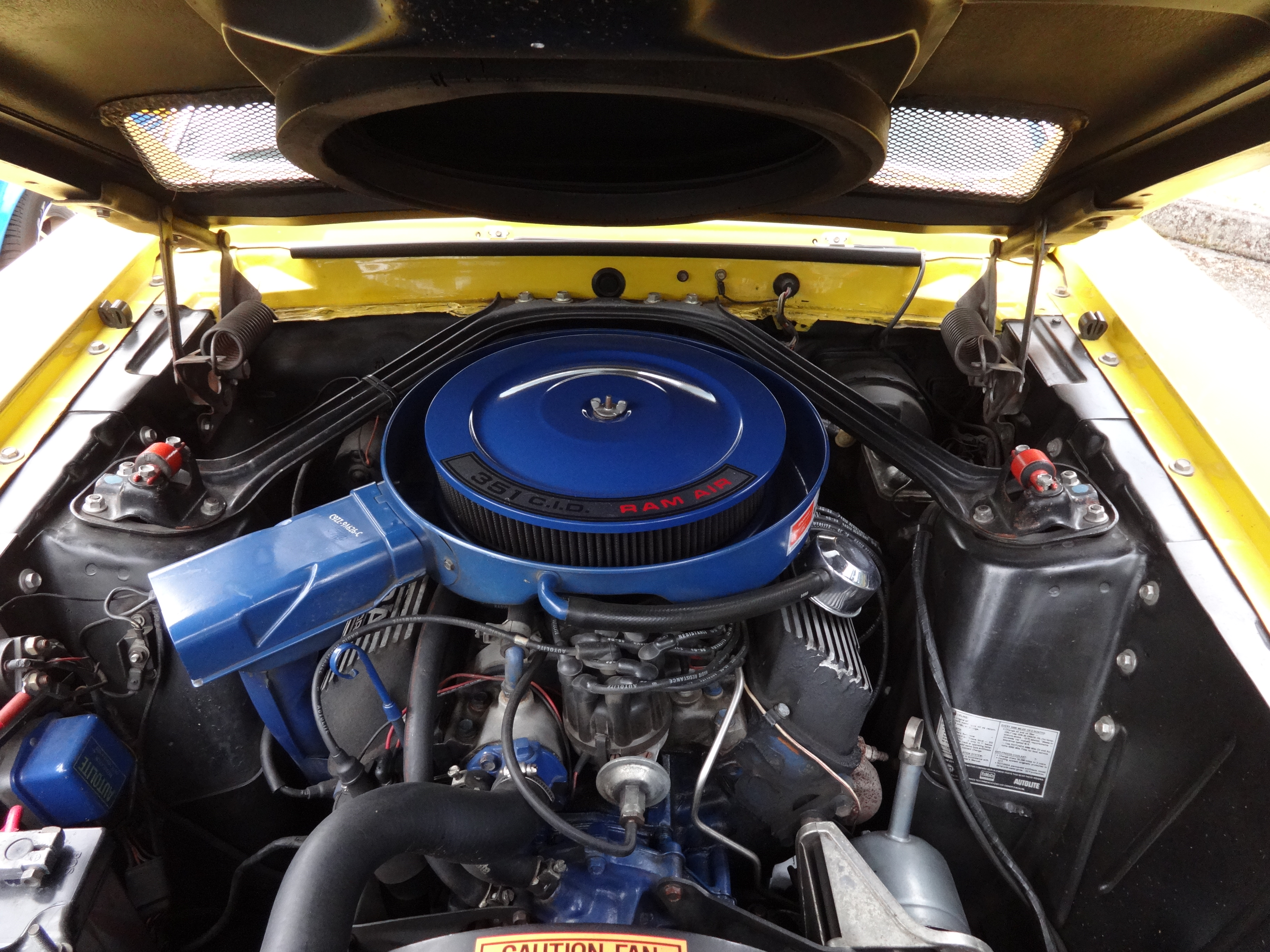
351 V8 engine in a 1969 Shelby GT 350

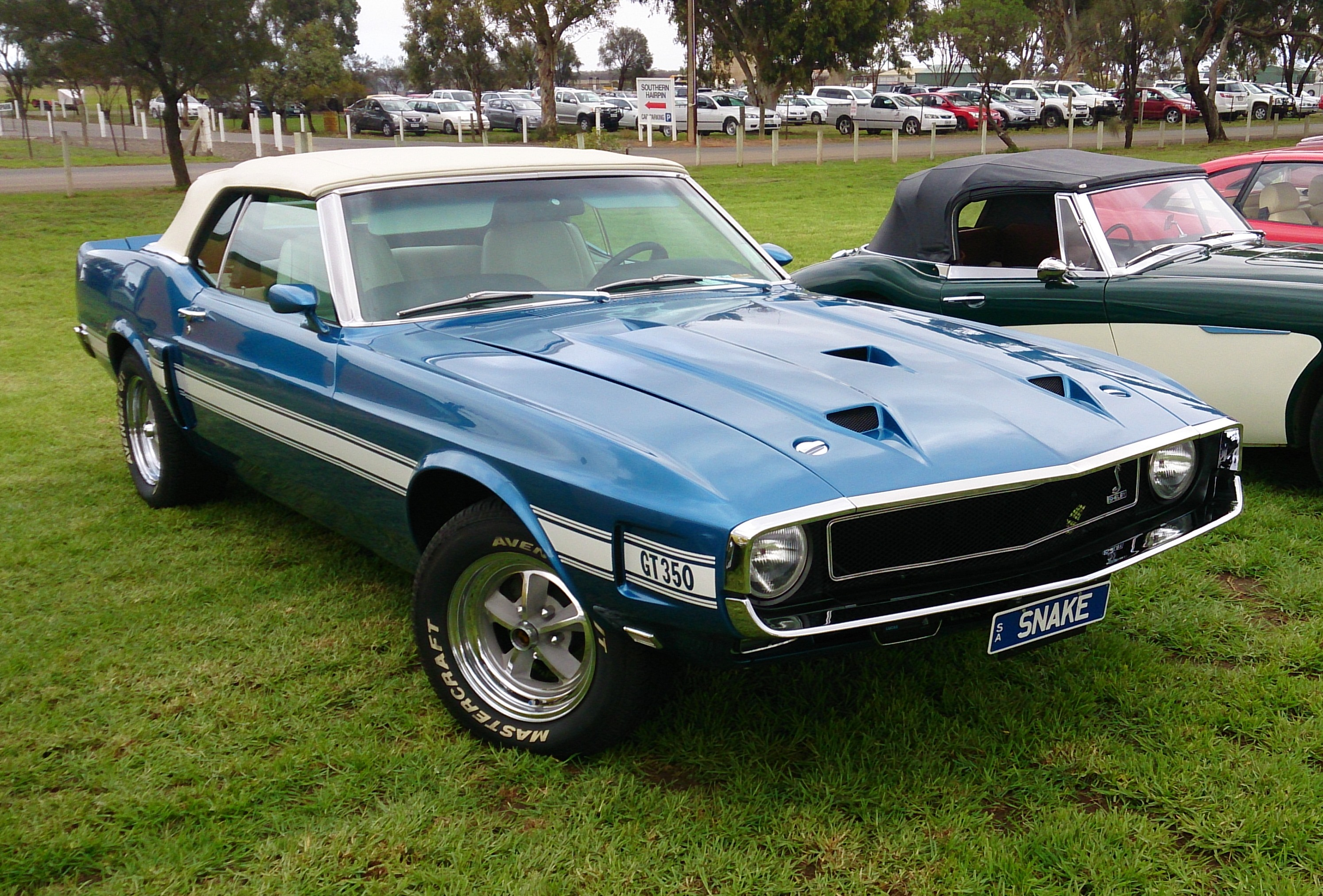
1969 Shelby GT350 Convertible

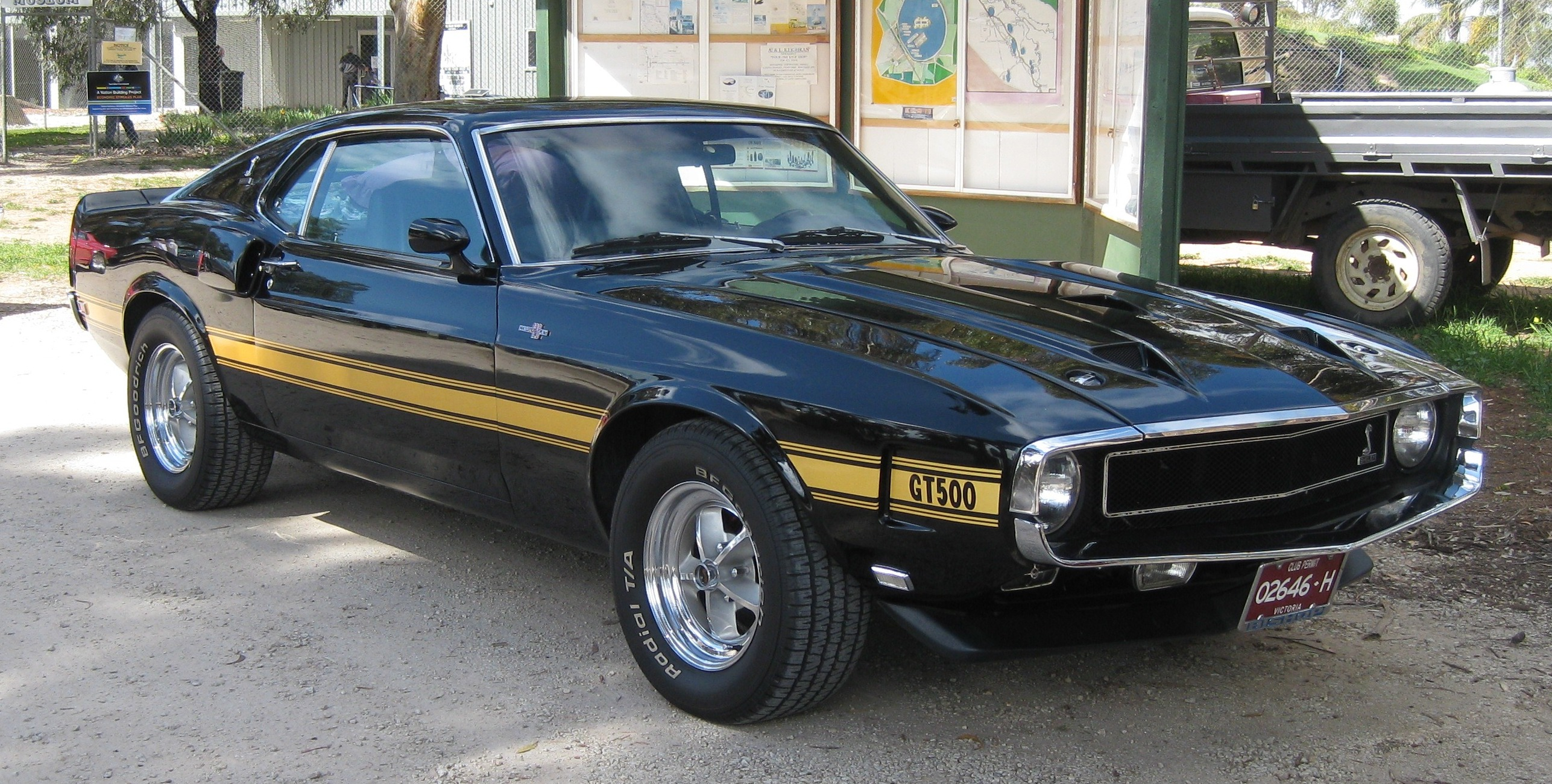
1969 Shelby GT500 Sportsroof

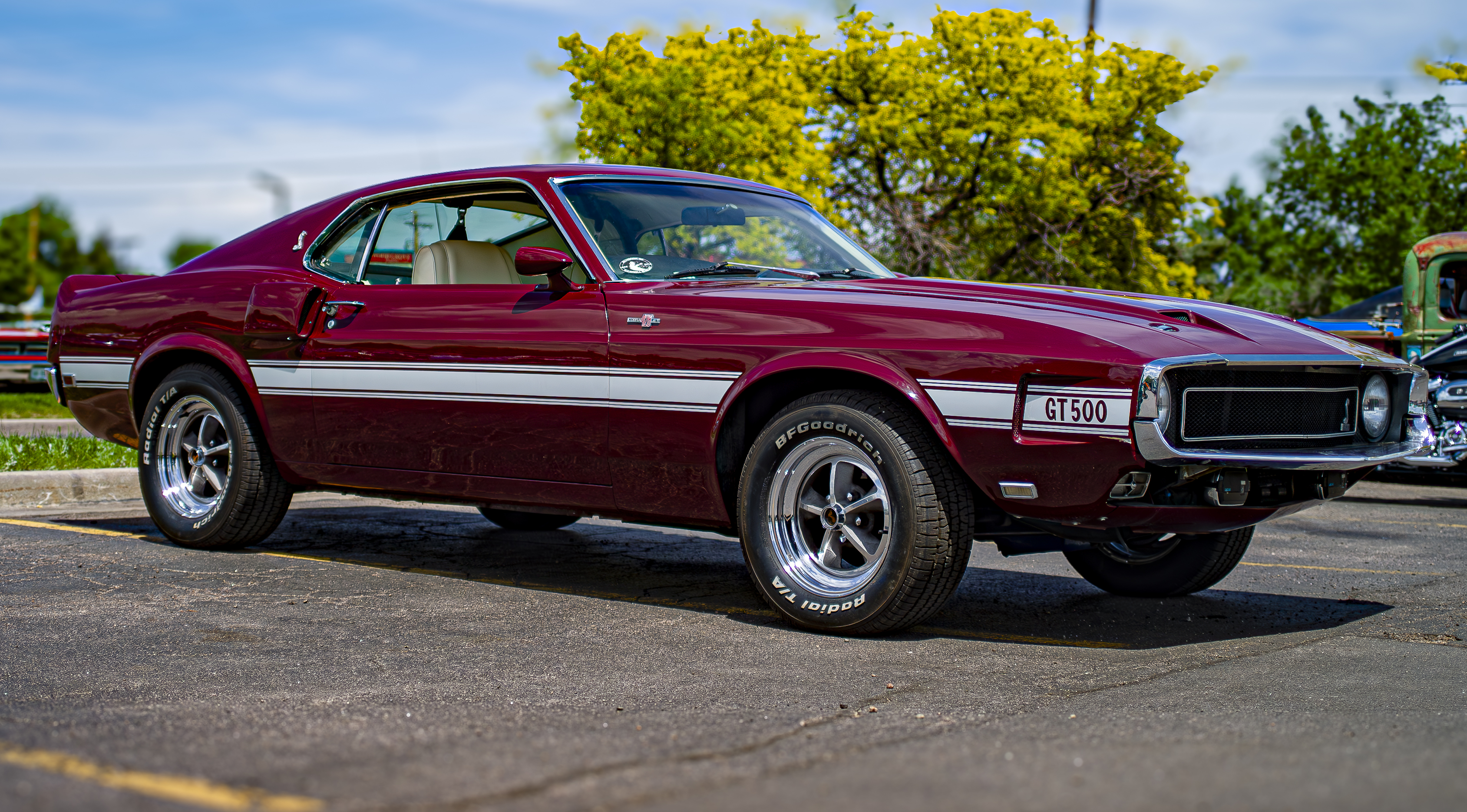
1969 Shelby GT500 fastback

=== Shelby de Mexico ===
Import restrictions limited Ford's Mexican operation to building the Mustang locally as a notchback coupe, so no fastbacks or convertibles were available there. Eduardo Velázquez, who distributed auto parts in Mexico, became by his own account Shelby American's biggest single buyer of parts and accessories, and he and Carroll Shelby went into business together as Shelby International, S.A., known as Shelby de Mexico. The company started in 1966 as a seller of Shelby parts. From 1967 it turned Mexican-built notchbacks into GT350s, which Mexican Ford dealers sold.

Annual output was 169 cars in 1967, 203 in 1968, and 306 in 1969. Cars from the first two years used a 289 V8 fitted with performance parts. Ford of Mexico did not build the 351 Windsor found in the American GT350, so the 1969 car received a 302 V8 produced in Hermosillo instead. Where the American 1969 GT350 had its own fenders, hood, and grille, the Mexican car kept the Mustang GT nose. Fiberglass extensions on the rear roof pillars imitated a fastback, and the tail carried Shelby parts: a deck lid, a spoiler, and the 1965 Ford Thunderbird taillights also used on the American car. Mechanical upgrades included firmer springs, Koni shock absorbers, sintered metallic brake linings, headers, and ten-spoke aluminum wheels.

The company built no cars for 1970. Its later GT351 was a notchback reshaped into a fastback with fiberglass panels and fitted with a 351 V8.

=== 1971 Shelby Europa ===
Although production of Shelby GTs in the USA had ceased, a total of nine 1971 "Shelby Europa" GT-350 and GT-500 Mustangs were produced under license by Belgian dealer Claude Dubois for the European market. Seven Fastbacks (Ford used the term Sportsroof) and two convertibles were produced; of which seven were M-code and one H-code cars. One 429SCJ J-code Fastback was produced, though its whereabouts today are unknown. Both convertibles and one fastback were modified to GT-500 with 351-HO. Both convertibles are located in Finland. All 1971 Shelby Europas were based on 1971 Mustang. Previously it was believed that 14 cars were produced, but the total production number of nine cars was confirmed in 2014 by cross-check of Claude Dubois' files and Ford Factory Mustang production data.

== 2nd generation 2005–2009 (S197 I) ==
=== Shelby CS6/8 ===
Shelby, along with Paxton, also designed a new variant based on the V6 Mustang. Modifications include a supercharged motor producing 350 hp (261 kW), 20-inch wheels bearing the Shelby name and the Cobra badge on each side and the decklid, a 2-inch drop in suspension, Baer/Shelby 14-inch front and rear brakes, an aggressive front fascia and a dual exhaust. Shelby also created the CS8, a 4.6-liter V8 variant of the CS6. The Shelby CS6/8 was not available as a factory release. However, Shelby had made the CS6/8 kit available for purchase. But then the contract with Hertz GT-H came, and only a handful of CS6/8' were built, making them one of the rarest cars ever built by Shelby.

=== 2006–2007 Ford Shelby GT-H ===
2006; 2008 Ford Shelby GT-H
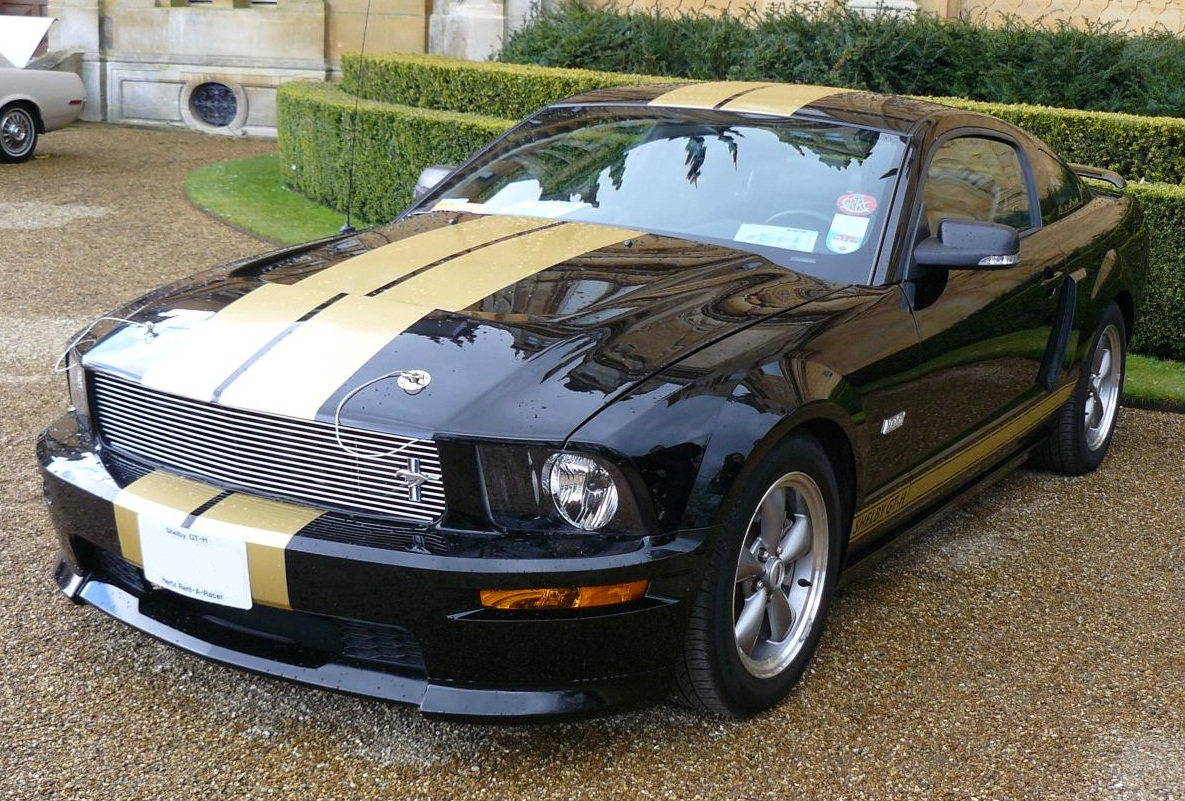
- 2006 Shelby GT-H

Overview
- Production: 2006; 2007
- Assembly: United States: Las Vegas, Nevada

Body and chassis
- Body style: 2-door coupe (2006); 2-door convertible (2007)
- Related: 2005–2009 Ford Mustang GT

Powertrain
- Engine: 4.6 L Modular 3-valve V8
- Transmission: Ford 5R55S 5-speed automatic

Dimensions
- Wheelbase: 107.1 in (2,720 mm)
- Length: 183.2 in (4,653 mm)

Chronology
- Predecessor: 1966 Shelby G.T.350-H
- Successor: 2007–2008 Ford Shelby GT; 2016 Ford Shelby GT-H

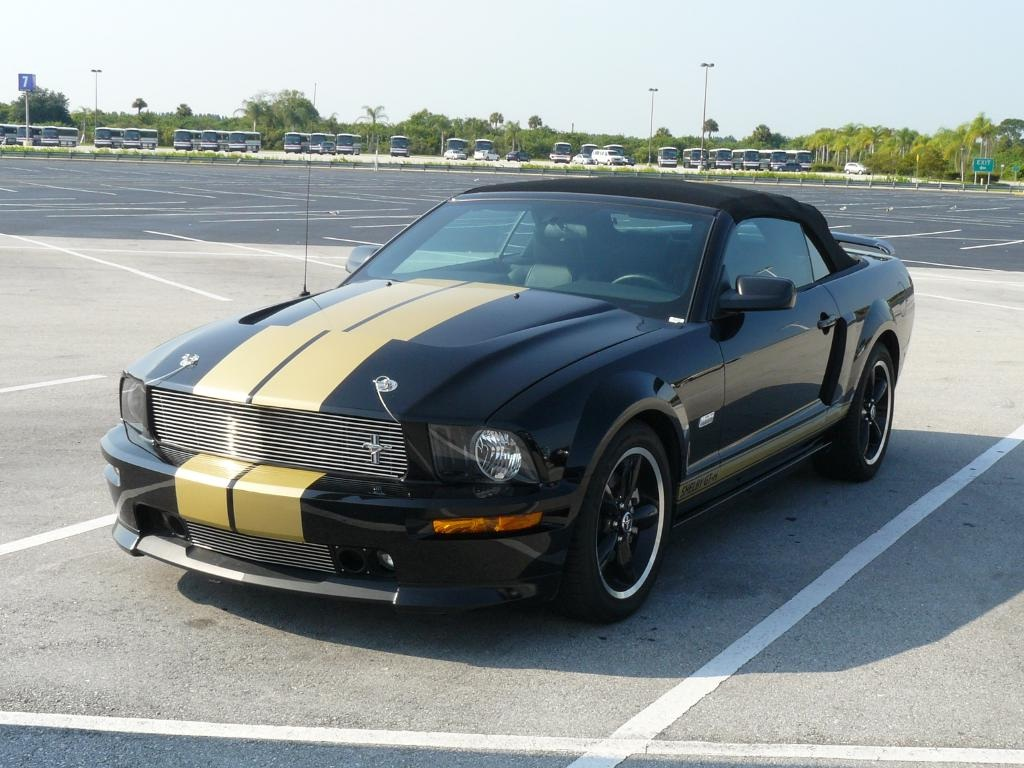
2007 Shelby GT-H Convertible

Ford introduced the Shelby GT-H version of the Mustang at the 2006 New York Auto Show. Like the original GT350H from 1966, the GT-H had gold-on-black paint and was only available at the Hertz car rental agency.

Ford Racing Performance Group provided Shelby its FR1 Power Pack to add 25 horsepower to the existing Mustang GT powertrain with an additional 10 ft-lb of torque. The package included a 90mm cold air kit, muffler kit, a new X-pipe and Ford Racing "GTA" axle-back mufflers. The Ford Shelby GT-H also had the Ford Racing Handling Pack (FR3) which included specially tuned dampers, lowering springs, sway bars, strut tower brace, and a Ford Racing 3.55:1 ratio rear axle assembly.

A total of 500 cars were built to celebrate the 40th anniversary of the original Shelby GT350H.

For 2007, a convertible version of the GT-H was offered for rental at Hertz. This time the convertibles came with a custom light bar reminiscent of the 1968 Shelby Mustang convertibles.

=== 2007–2008 Ford Shelby GT ===
2007–2008 Ford Shelby GT
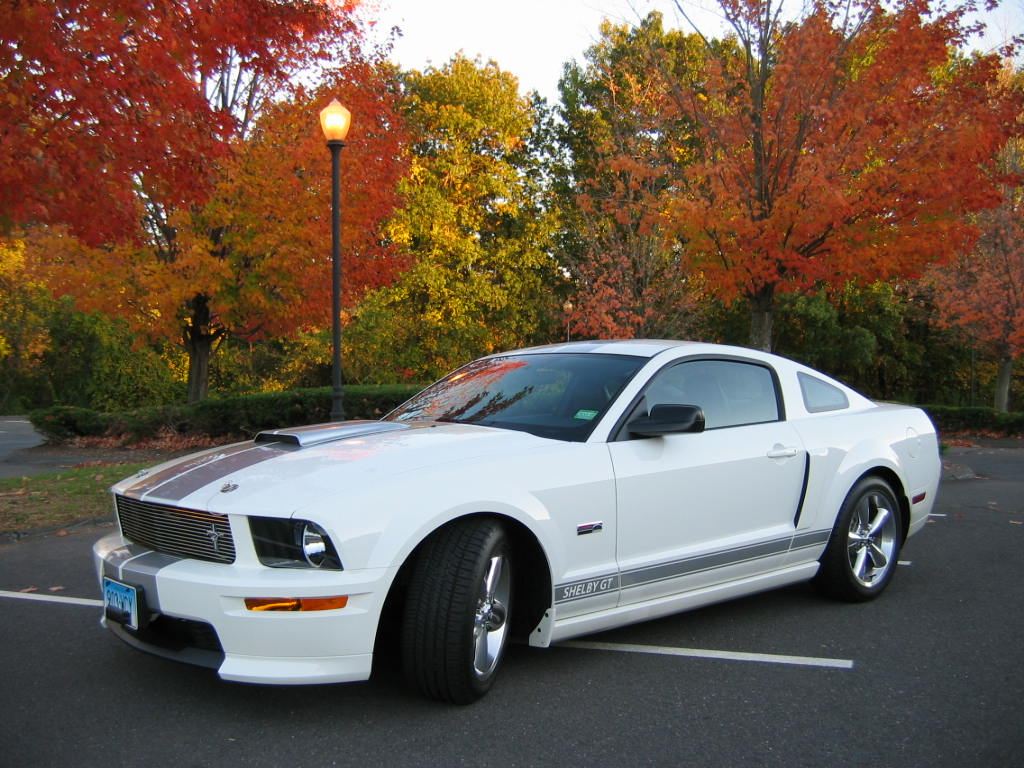
- 2007 Shelby GT

Overview
- Production: 2007–2008
- Assembly: United States: Las Vegas, Nevada

Body and chassis
- Body style: 2-door coupe (2007–2008); 2-door convertible (2008)
- Related: 2005–2009 Ford Mustang GT

Powertrain
- Engine: 4.6 L Modular 3-valve V8
- Transmission: Ford 5R55S 5-speed automatic; Tremec TR-3650 5-speed manual

Dimensions
- Wheelbase: 107.1 in (2,720 mm)
- Length: 183.2 in (4,653 mm)

Chronology
- Predecessor: 2006–2007 Ford Shelby GT-H
- Successor: 2012 Shelby GTS

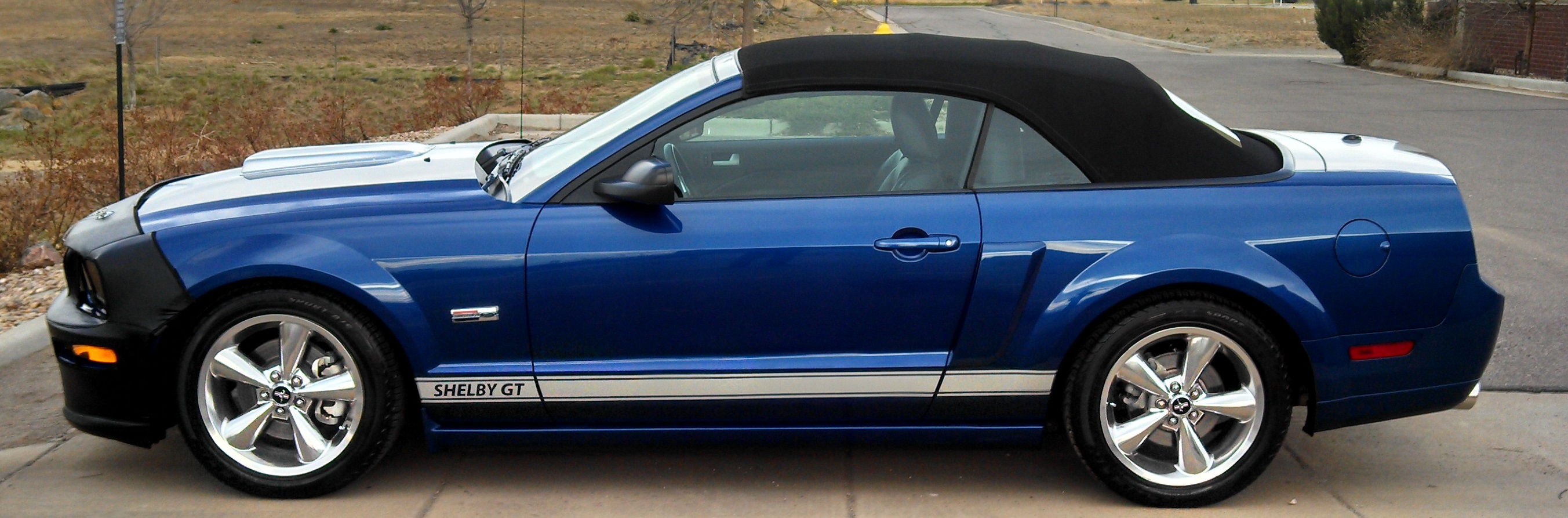
2008 convertible

The 4.6 liter, 281-cubic-inch, 319 hp (238 kW) Ford Shelby GT slotted between the 300 hp (220 kW) Mustang GT and the Ford Shelby GT500. It is essentially a retail sale version of the Hertz rental-only Ford Shelby GT-H, except a manual transmission is available. The Shelby GT was a unique model in that, just like the Shelby Mustangs of the 60s, the Shelby GT's manufacturing was completed at Shelby Automobiles Inc. in Las Vegas, Nevada after being shipped directly there by Ford Motor Company. Shelby GT's were then sold pre-title to customers. By comparison, GT500 models were manufactured solely by Ford Motor Company in Flat Rock, Michigan.

Production of the Shelby GT began in December 2006 and the car went on sale in January 2007. It was originally planned that a limited number of up to 6,000 cars would be built. The Shelby GT's include the deletion of the rear spoiler, a retro Shelby hood scoop, a cold air induction system with performance tuning resulting in a power output of 319 hp (238 kW), a Ford Racing suspension package consisting of upgraded dampers, springs which lowered the vehicle 1.5 inches and sway bars, a high performance exhaust system, interior Shelby sill plates and badges and silver stripes, with the car available in either white or black in 2007 and Vista Blue, Grabber Orange, or Black with red stripes for 2008. Following the 2007 Shelby GT-H convertible rental car, Shelby offered the 2008 Shelby GT as a Vista Blue coupe or convertible also in limited numbers. The Vista Blue models were available as a coupe or convertible

==== 2008 Shelby GT-C (Southern California) ====
The southern California Ford/Shelby dealers requested a California – Shelby GT, These grabber orange only cars were sold in California and some western states. Only 215 of these Carroll Shelby signed GT-C cars were sold. MSRP averaged $42,097. Only available as a coupe, these cars were optioned like the Hertz GT-H. These cars had Shelby serial numbers ranging from #08SGT0003 to #0217 and they were the first cars of the GT production run for 2008. #0001 and #0002 were reserved for Shelby Automotive and were not used.

==== 2008 Barrett-Jackson Shelby GT ====
A total of 100 units of Shelby GT coupe and convertible were named after the Barrett-Jackson auction. They included black exterior with "Barrett-Jackson Red" LeMans Hood and Side Stripes, Barrett Jackson Edition door sill plates, black interior with the Shelby GT serial number plate, special gas cap insert, autographed photo of Carroll Shelby, Craig Jackson, Amy Boylan, and Steve Davis.

The vehicle was unveiled at the Arizona International Auto Show. Production versions were sold in Arizona Region Ford dealers with an MSRP of US$38,980 (including $250 donation to the Carroll Shelby Children's Foundation).

One hundred Barrett Jackson Shelby GTs were built in 2008 that were black with red stripes, also available in coupe or convertible. The Barrett Jackson Shelby GTs were sold exclusively in Arizona. Ford dealers and customers asked for a version of the Shelby GT-H. Like the GT-H, the Shelby GT is modified at Shelby Automotive's factory in Las Vegas, Nevada, while the GT500s are produced entirely by AutoAlliance International.

==== Modifications ====
At the request of owners, a number of Shelby GTs were modified in various ways by Shelby Automobiles in Las Vegas. One of these modifications results in a model known as the Shelby GT/SC (Supercharged). A large number of add-ons could be had including the "Super Snake" brakes, as well as larger wheels and tires which were necessary to accommodate these brakes. Additionally there were three different available superchargers, again installed by Shelby Automobiles or authorized Shelby Mod Shop, that can increase rated horsepower to 550* max H.P.. These include the Ford Racing Whipple and the rare Paxton superchargers. *Superchargers were limited because the 4.6 engine did not have forged internal crankshaft and pistons.

=== 2007–2009 Shelby Terlingua ===
Shelby Terlingua

Overview
- Production: 2007–2009
- Model years: 2007–2009

Body and chassis
- Body style: 2-door coupe

Powertrain
- Engine: 4.0 L Cologne SOHC V6
- Transmission: 5-speed manual

Dimensions
- Curb weight: 1,543 kg (3,402 lb)

The Terlingua is a V6 Ford Mustang fitted with a Racing Team package that includes performance enhancements and modified cosmetic details by Shelby. The package is applied by Shelby Automobiles in Las Vegas, Nevada.

The Terlingua features improvements to the handling with Ford Racing components, and improved braking capabilities that included Baer brakes. The optional supercharger was a Paxton/Vortech blower in either polished or raw. This model also features a deep draw hood designed by Chief R&D at Shelby Vince LaViolette, 20-inch anthracite "Razor" wheels and a comprehensive styling changes including a logo with the Terlingua rabbit on the hood.

==== Specifications ====
- Horsepower: 375 hp (280 kW) at 5,300 rpm
- Torque: 240 lb⋅ft (325 N⋅m) at 3,500 rpm
- 0–60 mph (97 km/h): 5.5 seconds
- Top speed: 170 mph (274 km/h)

== 2nd generation 2011–2014 (S197 II) ==
=== 2011–2014 Shelby GTS ===
Shelby GTS

Overview
- Model years: 2011–2014

Body and chassis
- Body style: 2-door coupe; 2-door convertible
- Related: Ford Mustang (fifth generation)

Powertrain
- Engine: 3.7 L Cyclone V6; 3.7 L Cyclone supercharged V6; 5.0 "Coyote" V8; 5.0 "Coyote" supercharged V8
- Transmission: Getrag / Ford MT82 6-speed manual or automatic

Chronology
- Predecessor: 2007–2008 Ford Shelby GT

The Shelby GTS was unveiled at the 2011 New York Auto Show, a new upgrade kit designed to be highly optioned and attainable to the masses. It was available in both V6 and V8 form configurations. "It's a car that reaches a younger buyer while acknowledging the economic realities of our times," said Shelby American president John Luft at the time. Customers could have their car shipped directly to Shelby's Las Vegas facility to be converted or they could deliver the car themselves.

The basic GTS kit includes new front and rear fascias, a "deep draw" fiberglass hood, black billet grille, Shelby lettering on the trunk lid, the signature "Le Mans" dual stripes over the top and triple stripes with GTS lettering on the side, upgraded Baer brakes, a Borla exhaust system, new springs, shocks, and anti-roll bars. Additional options included a supercharger kit, even larger Baer brakes, adjustable camber/caster plates, a short-throw shifter, and BFGoodrich G-Force R1 race-compound tires. Shelby also added a serial number plaque and Shelby-badged floor mats.

==== 50th Anniversary Edition ====
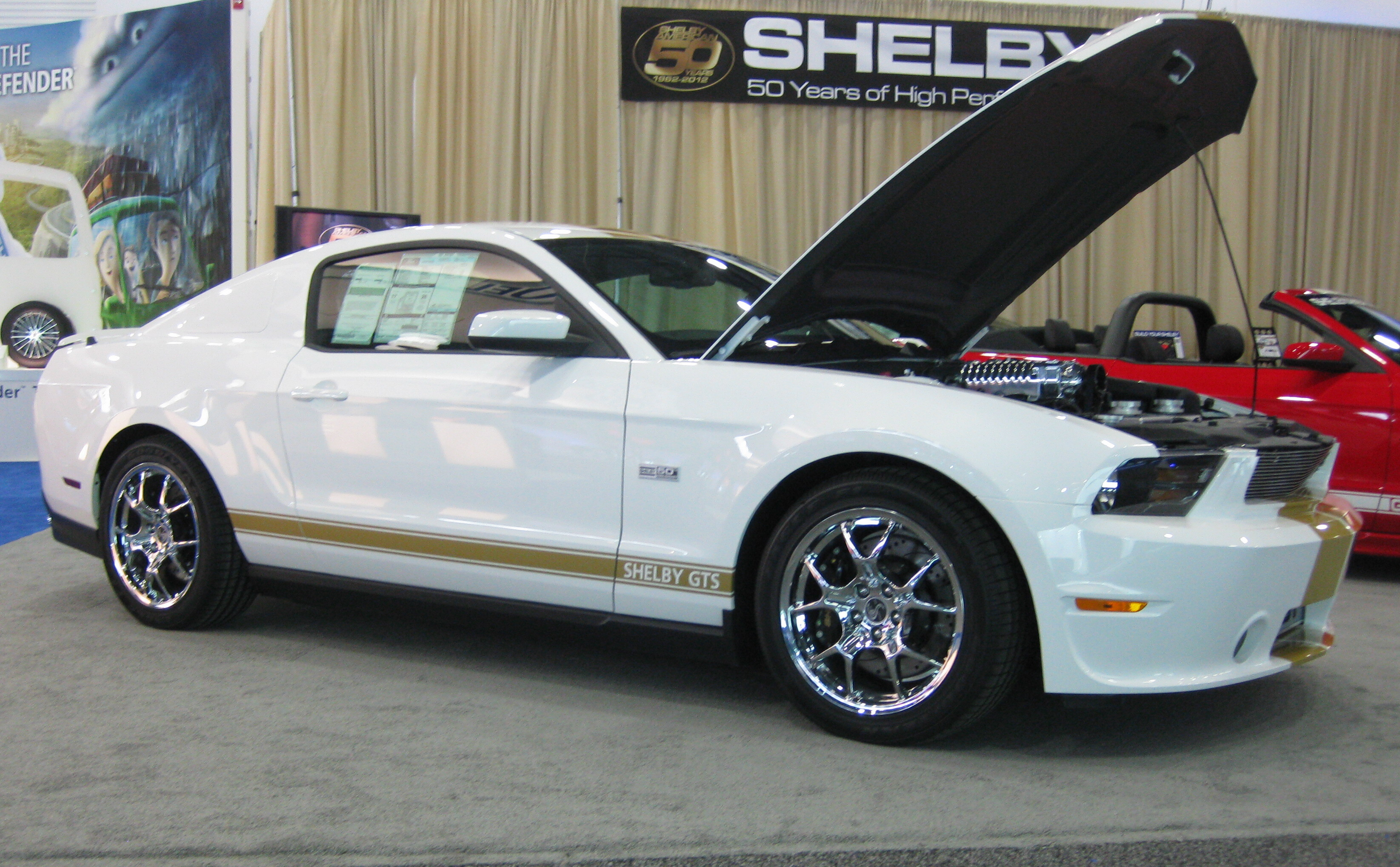
50th Anniversary Edition GTS

To celebrate the foundation of Shelby American, Shelby American made a 50th Anniversary Edition of the Shelby GTS available. The car was based on the 2012 Mustang (both V6 and V8 form configurations), and was only available in two exterior colors, Black and Performance White. Production was limited to 100 units with 50 being Black and 50 Performance White units.

=== 2011–2014 Shelby GT350 ===
Shelby GT350
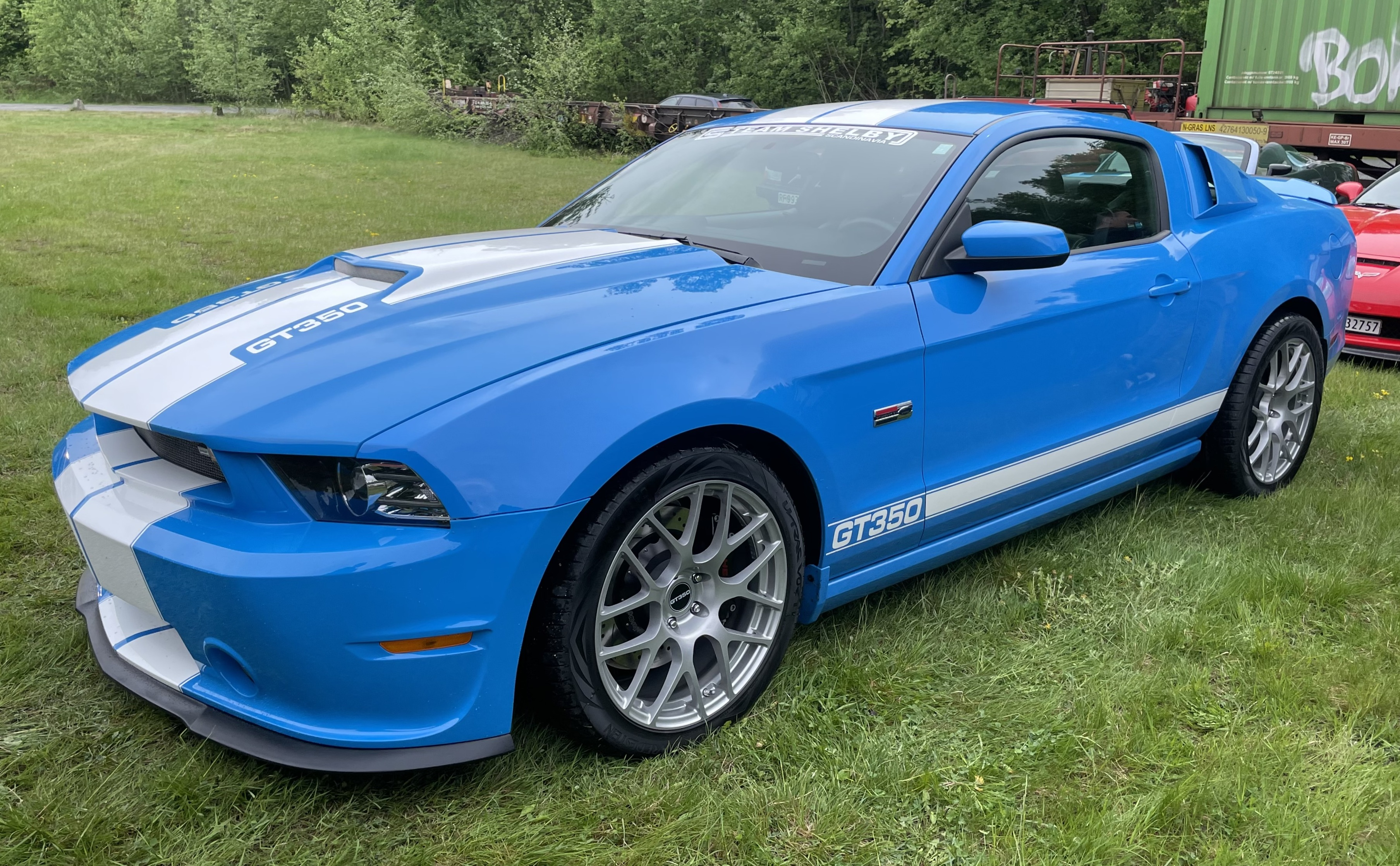
- 2014 Shelby GT350 Track Pack

Overview
- Production: 2010–2014
- Model years: 2011–2014

Body and chassis
- Body style: 2-door coupe (2011–2013); 2-door convertible (2012–2013)
- Related: Ford Mustang

Powertrain
- Engine: 5.0 L "Coyote" 4-valve DOHC V8; 5.0 L "Coyote" 4-valve DOHC supercharged V8
- Transmission: Getrag / Ford MT82 6-speed manual or automatic

Dimensions
- Length: 189.6 in (4,816 mm)
- Width: 73.9 in (1,877 mm)
- Height: 55.8 in (1,417 mm)
- Curb weight: 3,950 lb (1,790 kg)

Chronology
- Predecessor: 1965 Shelby G.T.350

Coinciding with the 45th anniversary of the original 1965 Shelby GT350, Shelby American unveiled an all new GT350 Mustang at the opening night gala of the 2010 Barrett-Jackson auction in Scottsdale, AZ. Presented in concept form, the new GT350 had a supercharged version of the brand new 5.0-liter V8 engine in the 2011 Mustang GT as well as performance upgrades from Ford Racing, Borla, Cragar, Baer and more.

==== 2011 Shelby GT350 ====
The production GT350 was a post-title upgrade available from Shelby. Customers could have their 2011 Mustangs shipped directly to Shelby's Las Vegas facility to be converted or they could deliver the car themselves. Automatic transmission cars were available for conversion with a naturally aspirated engine, producing up to 430 hp (321 kW). Manual transmission cars were given the option of a naturally aspirated or a supercharged engine fitted with a Ford Racing supercharger to produce 525 hp (391 kW), or at the expense of the warranty, a supercharger set at 624 hp (465 kW). Other parts added include a Ford Racing suspension system (The first 100 cars were fitted with the Eibach suspension carried over from the GT500 Supersnake), Baer brakes in front and optional in rear, a Custom Borla exhaust system, 19-inch Cragar wheels, and more. For the exterior, Shelby installed a new front fascia, front splitter, functional hood scoop, functional brake cooling ducts, tail light trim, rear deck lid filler panel, and a rear fascia with center exhaust exit, and 45th Anniversary badges. Performance White with Guardsman Blue Le Mans racing stripes were the only available color combination for 2011 models. 2012 models were available in other colors, but lost the 45th Anniversary badge of the 2011.

Initial road tests of the GT350 by Motor Trend show the 2011 Shelby GT350 is capable of accelerating from 0–60 mph (97 km/h) in 3.7 seconds, compared to the 412-horsepower 2011 Mustang GT's time of 4.4 seconds. It is also faster than the 2011 GT500, which needs 4.2 seconds to get to 60 mph (97 km/h) as well as the Shelby Super Snake with 750 hp (559 kW), which takes 4.1 seconds. Weight difference isn't a factor to blame for the better performance than the GT500, considering the GT350 is only 24 lb (11 kg) lighter than the newly lightened GT500.

The GT350's quarter mile time is 12 seconds at 121.4 mph (195.4 km/h).

==== NASCAR pace cars ====
Two GT350s (badged as 2011 cars) were used to pace the 2010 NASCAR race in Las Vegas. They had the prototype front fascia and are now displayed at the Shelby Heritage Museum, being a mainstay for promotional materials and posters.

==== 2012 Shelby GT350 ====
After being revealed at Barrett Jackson in 2010 as a celebration of the original Shelby GT350's 45th anniversary, the 2012 GT350 had its world debut at the 2011 Chicago Auto Show.

A convertible version was offered for 2012, the first convertible GT350 since 1970. The body kit upgrades included a revised front fascia, side rockers with brake ducts, rear bumper, decklid, new taillights and custom Shelby GT350 badges. The serialized dash plate with individual numbering for each GT350 produced was also included. The 2012 Shelby GT350 delivers the same performance numbers as the 2011 model, retaining the same combined engine and transmission options. The 2012 GT350 now included a new upgraded suspension system designed by Shelby to give the Mustang reduced body roll and better customization to create custom track setups. Custom Baer brake rotors and 6-piston brakes were also included in the package. The 2011 Shelby GT350 was previously offered only in Performance White with Guardsman Blue Le Mans racing stripes running the length of the vehicle, but the 2012 model year saw two new colors in Race Red with White Le Mans stripes and Kona Blue with White Le Mans stripes. These paint schemes are unique because they are not factory paint jobs from Ford.

==== 2013 Shelby GT350 ====
Revealed in 2013 as another upgrade kit for the Mustang GT, the Shelby GT350 was built in limited numbers and was offered in both coupe and convertible versions. For the 2013 model year, the GT350 received new color options, visual styling cues, and a revised set of optional performance enhancements. The 2013 Shelby GT350 is powered by the same 5.0 liter V8 engine, offered in naturally aspirated or supercharged versions. The naturally aspirated version had a default power output of 430 hp (321 kW) and could be optionally upgraded to 450 hp (336 kW), the supercharged version had a default power output of 525 hp (391 kW) and could be optionally upgraded to 624 hp (465 kW). Much like the previous years, the supercharged engine was only available with a manual gearbox with a short throw shifter as standard, an automatic transmission for the naturally aspirated engines did exist as an option.

The 2011 Ford Mustang GT from Shelby was previously only offered in a Performance White exterior color with Guardsman Blue Le Mans racing stripes running the length of the vehicle, and the 2012 model saw the addition of two new colors; Race Red with White Le Mans stripes and Kona Blue with White Le Mans stripes. The 2013 model year added even more color options in the form of Grabber Blue, Sterling Gray Metallic, "Gotta Have It" Green, Candy Red Tint Coat Metallic, Ingot Silver Metallic, Deep Impact Blue Metallic (replacing Kona Blue), Race Red, Performance White, and Black. These new colors could be combined with Satin Black or Gloss White stripes and a new set of wheels in Satin Black or Bright Silver Metallic. Other styling cues for 2013 included a glass roof option, Recaro seats, and a modified custom rear valance.

Changes for the 2013 model year also included a one-piece drive shaft, more powerful brakes, cooling enhancements, and a color coordinated billet aluminum engine cap set.

==== 2013 Prototype Demonstrator ====
A prototype of the 2013 GT350 was used as a track demonstrator vehicle, which ended up not being used as much as anticipated. It had a 624 hp (465 kW) supercharged V8 engine, premium interior with Recaro seats, gauges, and 6-piston Wilwood brakes in the front and 4-piston calipers in the rear. It was in the 2013 sales literature and is one of the Heritage Center show cars.

==== 2014 Shelby GT350 ====
Production was slimmed in anticipation for the next generation of Mustang, 87 GT350s were made in 2014. This included 73 coupes and 14 convertibles.

=== 2014 Shelby GT, Shelby GT/SC ===
2014 Shelby GT

Overview
- Production: 2014
- Model years: 2014

Body and chassis
- Body style: 2-door coupe
- Related: 2013 Shelby GTS

Powertrain
- Engine: 5.0 L "Coyote" Supercharged V8
- Transmission: 6-speed manual

Chronology
- Successor: 2015–2016 Shelby GT, Shelby GT Ecoboost

The Shelby American version of Shelby GT was based on the 2014 Ford Mustang GT. It was unveiled at the LA Auto Show.

Shelby offered a unique set of modifications for the exterior. On the base GT, it got a front splitter conversion with a GT500 rear spoiler and quarter glass covers. The hood was made of fiberglass to save weight and the Le Mans stripes added some style. A separate wide body conversion with the option of rear-only or full all-around wide body wheel arches was also available to spice up the exterior of the 2014 Shelby GT. Among other accessories, Shelby GT front fascia, carbon laminated hood louvers, billet upper grille with Ford running pony emblem and "Powered by Ford" badges on the sides completed the exterior package.

The interior of the 2014 Shelby GT had been overhauled to keep up with the latest trends. Unique touches to the interior included an A-pillar gauge pod with boost, and fuel and oil pressure gauges. This modification was only available on the GT/SC conversion. Even the standard GT conversion got the Shelby headrest covers, special GT dash plaque and engine plate. Leather upholstery in black was standard along with electrically adjustable seats.

The "Shelby GT Standard" is the base pack with 430 horsepower. The slight bump in power was achieved by fitting a Borla performance exhaust as well as engine tuning. The standard package also included a Barton short shifter. The "Shelby GT/SC" gives 100 more horsepower over the base modification. Shelby Ford Racing Whipple Supercharger kit in either 525 hp or 624 hp configurations, Shelby cooling system and front splitter. Although Shelby did not independently confirm the performance figures, a 0–60 mph (97 km/h) of 3.7 seconds and a quarter-mile in an estimated mid 11-second range has been estimated.

The base upgrade package used 20-inch wheels, fitted with BFG G-Force Comp2 tires and a Panhard suspension bar to stiffen up the chassis. Apart from this, the standard upgrade did not offer much in terms of performance or improved handling. Of course, better tires did provide improved grip while the suspension brace resulted in better cornering.

Shelby had done a whole lot to improve the dynamics of the Shelby GT/SC starting with an aluminum driveshaft, employed to deliver power to the rear wheels in order to reduce the overall mass. Wilwood brakes — six-pot front and four-piston rear — for added braking performance.

The 20-inch rims on the GT/SC were painted black and were fitted with Michelin Pilot Supersport tires. Eibach provided stiffer coil-over springs as well as a sway bar kit to improve handling.

== 3rd generation (2015–2017) ==
=== 2015–2016 Shelby GT ===
2015–2016 Shelby GT

Overview
- Production: 2015–2016
- Model years: 2015–2016

Body and chassis
- Body style: 2-door fastback coupe; 2-door convertible
- Related: Ford Mustang (sixth generation)

Powertrain
- Engine: Standard: 5.0 L "Coyote" supercharged V8; Ecoboost: 2.3 L Ecoboost I4
- Transmission: Getrag/Ford MT82 6-speed manual; Ford 6RSO 6-speed automatic

Chronology
- Predecessor: 2014 Shelby American Shelby GT, Shelby GT/SC

Shelby American launched the 2015 Shelby GT in 2015. It is a package available for the 2015 Ford Mustang GT and is available with either manual or automatic transmissions.

According to Shelby American, the upgrades for the 2015 Shelby GT include a more aggressive style with carbon fiber enhancements: hood, rockers, splitters, spoiler and diffuser. Shelby GT also features cold air intakes, custom 20" WELD Venice wheels with high-grip Michelin tires, Ford Performance supercharger, Wilwood brakes, adjustable rear control arms, dash-mounted 3-gauge pod for track boost, fuel and oil pressure, race seats, roll cage and harness.

==== Shelby GT Ecoboost ====
The Shelby GT350-Ecoboost is a Shelby GT package for Ford Mustang Ecoboost launched in 2015. The package is available in only in the United States.

The GT EcoBoost's exterior changes are extensive. Many of the upgrades are the same as the ones found on packages offered on Ford Mustang GT. This includes the extensive use of carbon fiber, notable in the front splitter, hood, rear spoiler and rocker panel.

The Shelby GT Ecoboost includes a Ford Performance handling pack upgraded suspension. Like the manual and automatic transmission V8 version, the GT-EcoBoost version of the car is far more than stripes and a badge. The car was refined with a Ford Performance handling pack upgrade, engine tune and a throatier Ford Performance exhaust. The result is over 335 hp (250 kW) on 91 octane fuel and significantly better handling.

=== 2015–2016 Shelby Super Snake ===
2015–2016 Shelby Super Snake

Overview
- Also called: Mustang GT Super Snake
- Production: 2015–2016
- Model years: 2015–2016

Body and chassis
- Body style: 2-door fastback coupe; 2-door convertible
- Related: 2015–2016 Ford Mustang GT

Powertrain
- Engine: 5.0 L Coyote V8 with Shelby/Ford Racing or Shelby/Whipple supercharger
- Transmission: Getrag/Ford MT82 6-speed manual; Ford 6RSO 6-speed automatic

Chronology
- Predecessor: 2013–2014 Shelby GT500 Super Snake

Shelby American launched the new Shelby Super Snake in 2015. Due to the discontinuation of Shelby GT500, the 2015 Super Snake lost its GT500 tag, but still have some people called it as GT500 Super Snake. Like the 2015 Shelby GT, it is also based on 2015 Ford Mustang GT. The 2015 Super Snake has a 5.0L V8 equipped with a Shelby/Ford Racing supercharger engine rated at 650+hp (750+hp via Shelby/Whipple Supercharger). According to Shelby, the test car produces 850 hp (634 kW). But the car's 12.3-second, 116 mph (187 km/h) quarter-mile during testing by Road and Track lead them to conclude that the power figure should be much lower.

In front is a carbon-fiber Super Snake hood, adorned with a forced-air scoop that rises above the central grille. The grille is also new, with a black anodized material used both in the upper and lower portions of the front intake.

Aerodynamically, Shelby added a carbon-fiber front diffuser, which is complemented in the rear by a larger carbon-fiber spoiler. Below the wing there's more carbon fiber used in the new rear diffuser, taillight panel, and rocker panels with side-skirt aero blades just in front of the rear wheels. The composite is also in place for the mirror covers. Finally, there's the requisite Super Snake racing stripes and external badging.

The Super Snake includes special CSM badging, Shelby floor mats, sill plates, a dash-mounted gauge pod made from carbon fiber and stuffed with AutoMeter gauges, Ford Performance short-throw shifter, an upholstery upgrade, racing seats, five-point racing harnesses, Shelby valve covers, and a carbon-fiber latch cover.

Routing the power are 3.73 gears and new half shafts, both from Ford Performance. The tires are Michelin Pilot Super Sport on 20-inch WELD Racing Super Snake wheels. For the first time, the Super Snake will be available with either a six-speed manual or six-speed automatic transmission. Under hood options include an upgraded intercooler and cooling kits for the differential and transmission.

Shelby American has for the first time provided right-hand drive version Super Snakes to the UK and Europe through official distributor Bill Shepherd Mustang, and also to Australia, introduced by Mustang Motorsport.

=== 2016 Shelby Terlingua ===
2016 Shelby Terlingua

Overview
- Also called: Terlingua Mustang
- Production: 2016
- Model years: 2015–2016

Body and chassis
- Body style: 2-door fastback coupe
- Related: 2016 Ford Mustang GT

Powertrain
- Engine: 5.0 L "Coyote" supercharged V8
- Transmission: Getrag/Ford MT82 6-speed manual; Ford 6RSO 6-speed automatic

Shelby American offered a limited run of 50 Shelby Terlingua Racing Team Mustangs based on the 2015–16 Ford Mustang GT in 2016. The Shelby Terlingua is Shelby American's most track-inspired Mustang and is built as a tribute to the Terlingua Racing Team and their 1967 Trans Am Championship.

Modifications for the Terlingua include a Whipple supercharger mated to the new Mustang GT 5.0 L V8 engine producing over 750 hp (560 kW) and an exclusive Eibach sway bar and adjustable coilovers. The Terlingua also includes Ford Performance's upgrades like halfshafts, a short throw shifter and a Borla Exhaust with black tips. The car also added the Brembo big brake kit for race track proven performance, and with 20-inch WELD racing wheels, tons of Shelby-designed carbon fiber components and the distinct Terlingua Racing Team badging.

=== 2016 Ford Shelby GT-H ===
2016 Ford Shelby GT-H

Overview
- Production: 2016
- Model years: 2016

Body and chassis
- Body style: 2-door fastback coupe
- Related: 2016 Ford Mustang GT

Powertrain
- Engine: 5.0 L "Coyote" V8
- Transmission: Ford 6RSO 6-speed automatic

On the 50th anniversary of the Rent-a-Racer program, Ford, Hertz and Shelby introduced the 2016 Shelby GT-H. Based on the 5.0L V8 Mustang GT, Shelby enhanced the Mustang with Ford Performance components including suspension, exhaust and wheels, along with Shelby design cues like polycarbonate hood and stripes. Beginning Memorial Day, 140 2016 Shelby GT-H's are available for rent as modern-day "Rent-A-Racers" through the Hertz Adrenaline Collection at select U.S. airport locations.

There are several logos and emblems spread throughout the body. "GT-H" logos are on the grille, rear faux gas cap, and on the trunk lid. Shelby replaced the standard front splitter and rear spoiler with elements made of carbon-fiber. The hood is also specially crafted with vents and a big bulge at the center, the same as the Shelby GT. It has 19-inch aluminum wheels fitted with Michelin tires (255/40s at the front and 275/40s at the rear.

The interior of the new Ford Mustang Shelby GT-H is based on the standard Mustang GT. Only a few features sets the two models' interior styling apart. They include "GT-H" logos on the headrests, customized sill plates with "Hertz Shelby GT-H" lettering and a numbered plaque on the dash. The floor mats also have "GT-H" logos.

It also features a cat-back exhaust system from the Ford Performance. This specifically gives the model a throatier sound. A "Shelby-GT-H" engine plaque is also added as well as an engine cap kit. The chassis has also been updated via the Ford Racing Handling Pack which helps deliver a race-like driving experience. The package adds lowered springs, special-tuned dampers and revised sway bars.

=== 2017 Shelby Super Snake ===
==== 2017 50th Anniversary edition ====
In January 2017, Shelby American introduced the 50th Anniversary edition Shelby Super Snake based on the 2017 Mustang GT and having a limited production run of 500 units. The 50th anniversary edition has different fascia and wheels than that of the Mustang GT version, can accelerate from 0 to 60 mph in 3.5 seconds along with having a quarter mile time of 10.9 seconds.

=== 2017 Shelby GTE ===
Shelby Mustang

Overview
- Production: 2016–present
- Model years: 2017–present

Body and chassis
- Body style: coupe; 2-door convertible
- Related: Ford Mustang (sixth generation)

Powertrain
- Engine: Standard: 5.0 L "Coyote" V8 with Ford Performance 627HP supercharged; Ecoboost: 2.3 L Ecoboost I4
- Transmission: Getrag/Ford MT82 6-speed manual; Ford 6RSO 6-speed automatic

Shelby American introduced the Shelby GTE on August 2, 2016. Like the Shelby GT, the GTE (in which the E stands for "Enhanced") is also available with either the V8 or Ecoboost engine, and an automatic or manual transmission. The V8 version produces 456 hp (340 kW), 21 hp (16 kW) more than the standard Mustang GT. The power increases come in part from the Ford Performance catalog, with V8 models getting the factory-approved Power Pack. EcoBoost models, in contrast, get a Shelby-specific engine tune. GTEs also get the Ford Performance Handling Pack and Ford Performance Borla cat-back touring exhaust as well as Ford Performance 19-inch wheels with tires of Shelby's choosing. The GTE also gets its own specific hood, upper and lower front grille, splitter, rocker panels, and rear spoiler.

== SVT 1st generation GT500 2007–2009 (S197 I) ==
=== 2007–2009 Ford Shelby GT500 ===
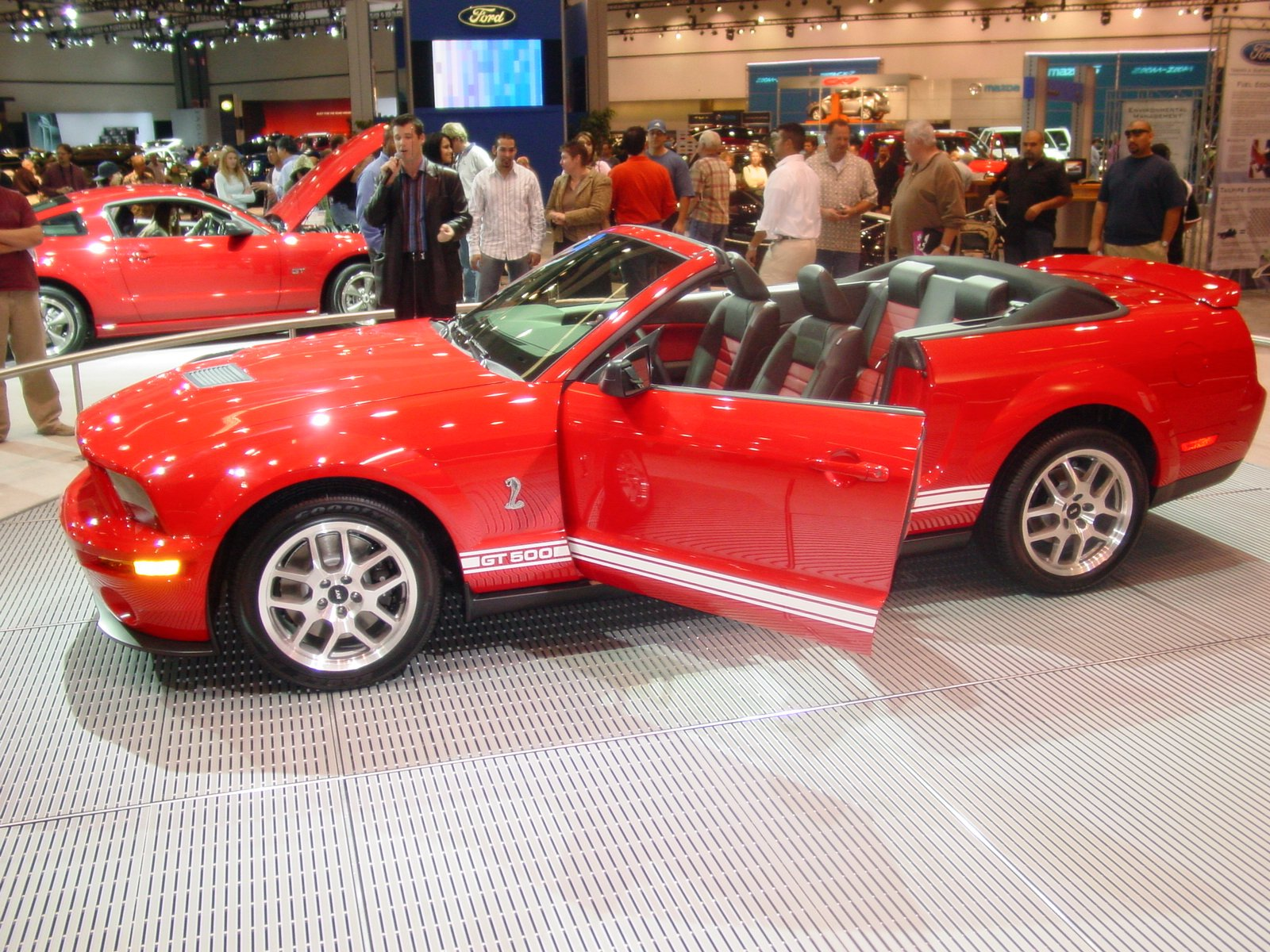
2007 Shelby GT500 Convertible

2007–2009 Ford Shelby GT500
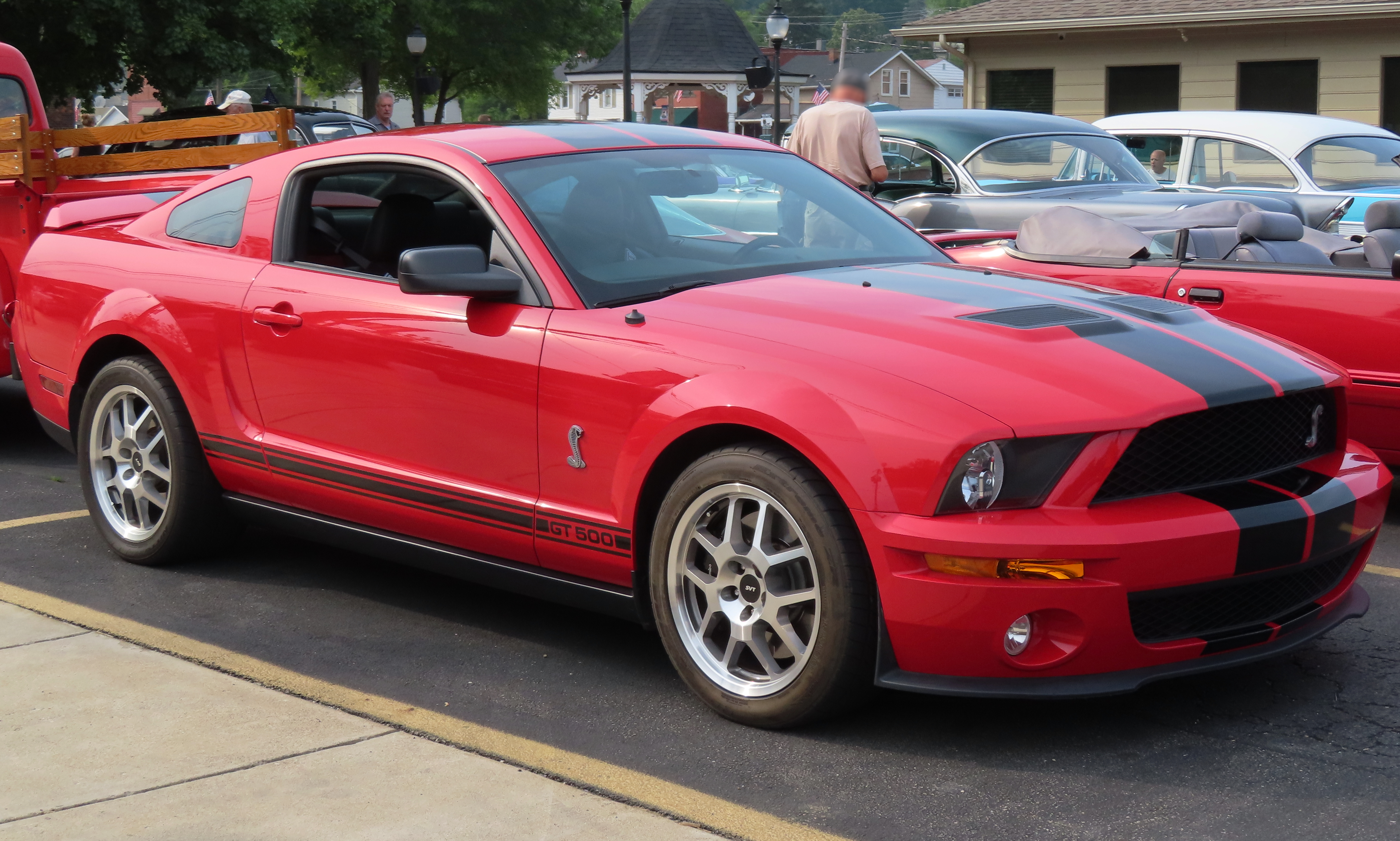
- 2008 Shelby GT500

Overview
- Production: 2006–2010
- Model years: 2007–2009
- Assembly: United States: Flat Rock, Michigan (Flat Rock Assembly Plant)

Body and chassis
- Body style: 2-door convertible (not available for GT500KR); 2-door coupé

Powertrain
- Engine: 5.4 L Modular 4-valve supercharged V8
- Transmission: Tremec TR-6060 6-speed manual

Dimensions
- Wheelbase: 107.1 in (2,720 mm)
- Length: 187.6 in (4,765 mm)
- Width: 74.0 in (1,880 mm)
- Height: 54.5 in (1,384 mm)
- Curb weight: 1,778 kg (3,920 lb)

Chronology
- Predecessor: 2003–2004 Ford Mustang SVT Cobra Terminator
- Successor: 2010–2012 Ford Shelby GT500

Shelby and Ford returned for the 2007 model year with the Shelby GT500. Introduced at the 2005 New York International Auto Show, the GT500 uses a supercharged and intercooled Modular 5.4 L; 330.0 cu in (5,408 cc) V8 engine rated at 500 hp (507 PS; 373 kW) at 6,000 rpm and 480 lb⋅ft (651 N⋅m) at 4,500 rpm of torque. Features include the Tremec TR-6060 6-speed manual transmission, suspension tuning, a body kit, and 18-inch wheels.

Deliveries of the Shelby GT500 began in May 2006.

A collaboration of Ford's SVT and Carroll Shelby, the GT500 was produced in limited quantity for three years (approximately 10,000 units per year) on the line at Ford's Flat Rock, Michigan (AutoAlliance) assembly facility.

In 2008, Shelby built a 5.4 L twin-turbocharged prototype from the GT500 under the name Code Red with the help of Nelson Racing Engines. The car had a power output of 1,000 bhp (750 kW), but didn't reach production due to its high cost and extreme nature.

==== 2008–2009 GT500KR ====
2008–2009 Ford Shelby GT500KR
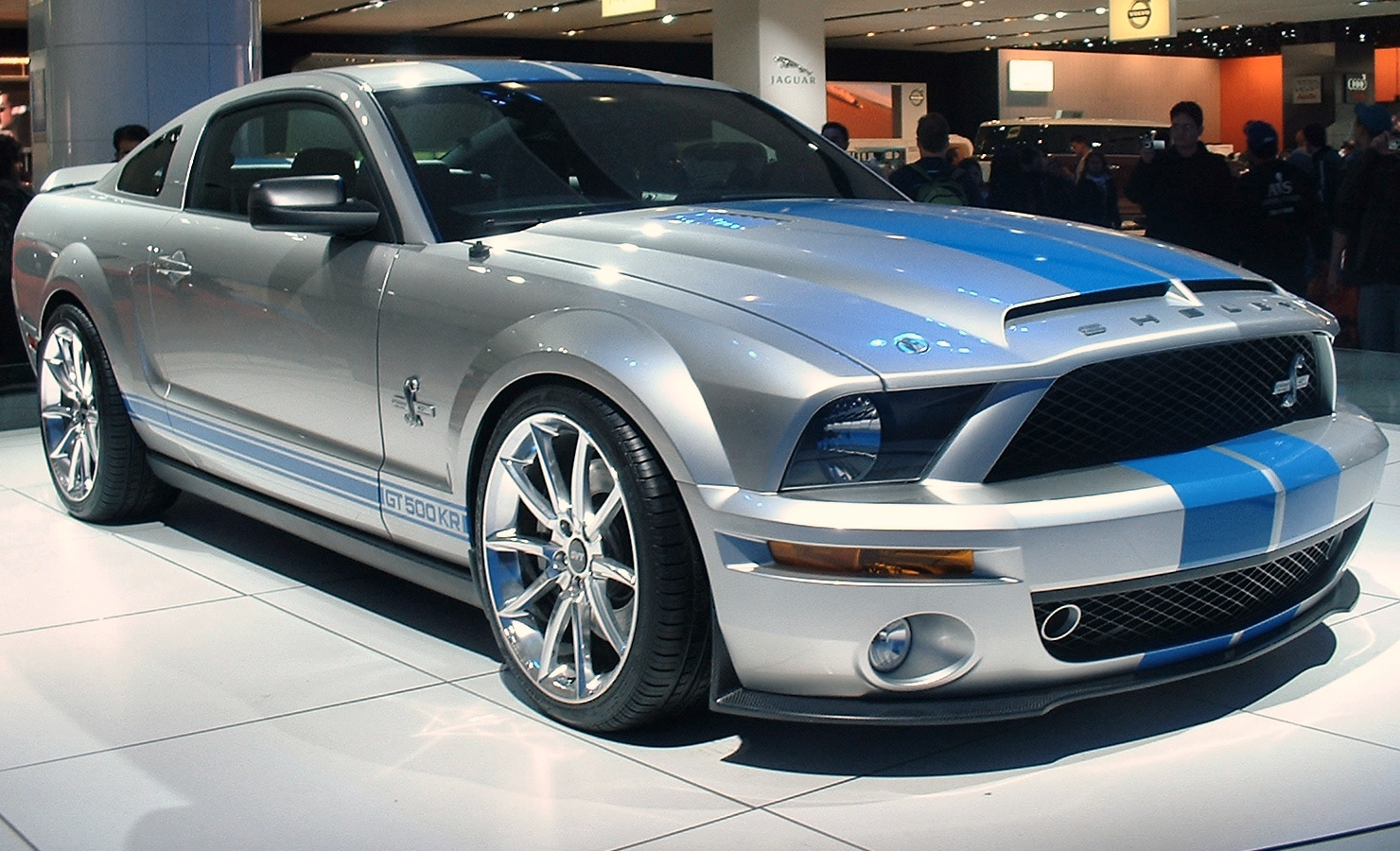

Overview
- Production: 2008–2009
- Model years: 2008–2009

Powertrain
- Engine: 5.4 L Modular Supercharged V8

Dimensions
- Length: 188 in (4,775 mm)
- Width: 73.9 in (1,877 mm)

Chronology
- Predecessor: 1968 Shelby Cobra G.T.500KR

The Ford Shelby GT500KR, revealed at the 2007 New York International Auto Show, was released in the spring of 2008. The car is powered by a Modular 5,408 cc (5.4 L; 330.0 cu in) supercharged and intercooled version of the base GT500 V8 engine now upgraded to 540 bhp (547 PS; 403 kW) at 6,250 rpm and 510 lb⋅ft (691 N⋅m) at 4,500 rpm of torque with functional Cold Air Intake and unique calibration. SVT and Shelby announced that 1,000 40th Anniversary Editions would be built for the U.S. in 2008, with another 571 units in 2009. This 1,571 production run matches that of the original 1968 GT500KR. In total, 1,712 units were produced, with the remaining units going to Canada, export markets and military sales.

All KRs were built by AutoAlliance International on the normal Mustang production line and then shipped to Shelby Automobiles Incorporated (SAI) where final assembly was completed.

The Shelby GT500KR features a carbon fiber composite hood with functional scoops and vents, twist-lock hood pins modeled on the original 1968 KR, a unique carbon fiber splitter, carbon fiber mirror caps, and functional brake cooling ducts. The suspension was tuned by SVT with unique spring rates, dampers, stabilizer bars, and strut tower brace and was sourced from Ford Racing. Unique Goodyear Eagle F1 Supercar tires were developed for the KR with a unique compound. With the same tread pattern as the Eagle F1 Supercar tire on the 2007–2009 GT500 they can only be identified by a unique Goodyear "Wingedfoot" emblem on the sidewall.

The 2008–09 GT500KR draws on styling cues from the classic 1968 "King of the Road" GT500KR model, and the 2008 model includes "40th Anniversary" badging; both years will have availability of standard GT500 colors with "LeMans" stripes, and Carroll Shelby signature embroidered seats. The GT500KR's starting price was $120,000.

The GT500KR features prominently in the Knight Rider television reboot on NBC. One of the main new characters of the show is KITT (voiced by Val Kilmer), an advanced artificial intelligence housed in a GT500KR that was colored black with dark gray stripes, using the GT500KR's hood scoops for its famous red scanner. KARR (once again voiced by Peter Cullen) KITT's evil prototype is also a Ford Mustang GT500KR, although its scanner is yellow, like its own original incarnation.

===== Other specifications =====
- 4 seating
- Displacement 5,408 cc (5.4 L; 330.0 cu in)
- Power: 540 bhp (547 PS; 403 kW) at 6,250 rpm
- Torque: 510 lb⋅ft (691 N⋅m) at 4,500 rpm
- 3.73 differential ratio
- 18 × 9.5" Alcoa wheels with unique Goodyear Eagle F1 Supercar tires (front: P255/45ZR18 rear: 285/40/ZR18)

==== 2007–2009 Shelby GT500 Super Snake ====
2007–2009 Shelby GT500 Super Snake
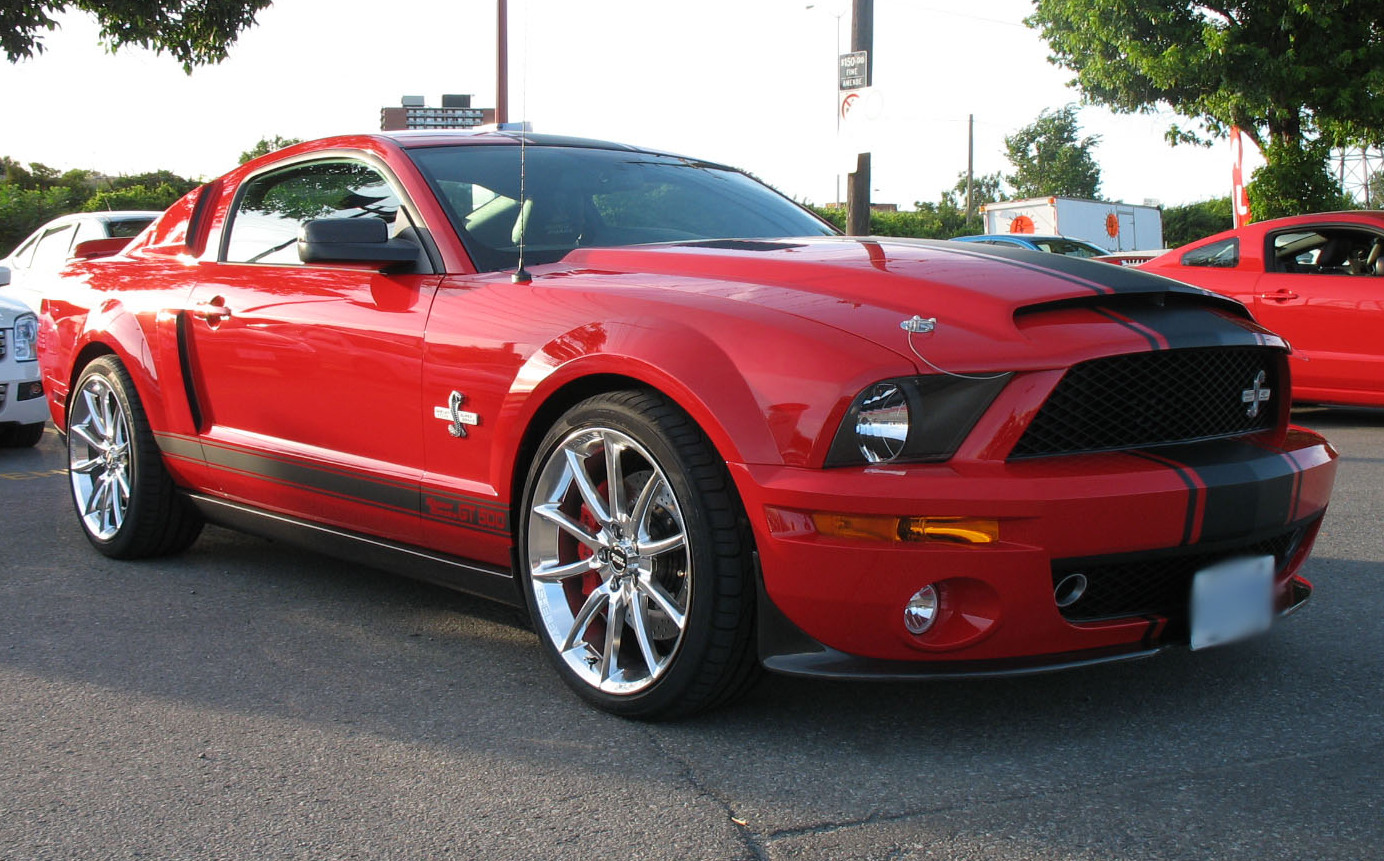

Overview
- Model years: 2007–2009

Body and chassis
- Body style: 2-door coupe; 2-door convertible
- Related: 2007–2009 Ford Shelby GT500; 2008–2009 Ford Shelby GT500KR

Powertrain
- Engine: 5.4 L Modular 4-valve Supercharged V8
- Transmission: Tremec TR-6060 6-speed manual

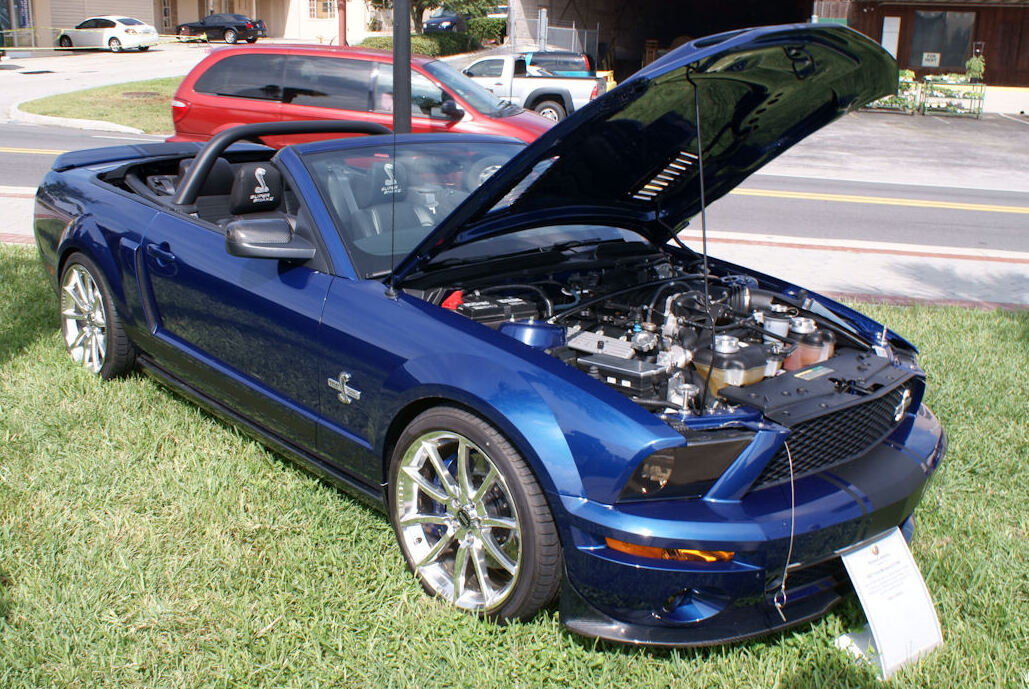
2007 Shelby GT500 Super Snake convertible

Starting in 2008, previous 2007 Shelby GT500 Mustangs could be sent to Carroll Shelby's Special Performance Plant in Las Vegas to be rebuilt into a Super Snake, for an additional cost of $27,995. The Super Snake will offer a 605 hp (451 kW) (at the engine) 5.4 L. A Kenne Bell twin-screw supercharged version with "over 725 hp" was also available, without warranty and offered a varied 0–60 mph acceleration time in 3.5 to 3.7 seconds. The Super Snake is inspired by the 1967 GT500 Super Snake, a car made by Carroll Shelby for Goodyear Tires.

The Super Snake also comes with a variety of other performance, handling and cosmetic changes. These include badging, new gauge pod, 20-inch Alcoa wheels, fibreglass ram-air Super Snake hood, stripes, carbon fiber front splitter and side skirts, larger 6-piston Baer brakes, front and rear brake cooling ducts, complete track setup suspension, aluminum driveshaft, 3.73 differential gears and cat-back exhaust system.

The Super Snake package was also available for 2005–2006 Ford Mustang.

==== Prudhomme Edition Super Snake (2009–2010) ====
The Prudhomme Edition Super Snake is a limited (100 units) drag racing package for the 2007–2010 Ford Shelby GT500 cars, named after Don Prudhomme. The engine is rated at 800 hp (597 kW) on race fuel or 750 hp (559 kW) on 93 octane pump gas. It includes a Kenne Bell supercharger, a modified air intake sticking out of the hood in the tilt front end, a five-point Impact safety harness, a Borla side exhaust system, front and rear adjustable BMR racing suspension and drag tires with optional street tires. The side lower rockers are incorporated.

The package has an MSRP of $100,000 (not including the car).

The Prudhomme concept car went on sale in 2009 Barrett-Jackson Las Vegas auction. The vehicle was sold with a winning bid price of $275,000 (before buyer premium).

== SVT 2nd generation GT500 2010–2014 (S197 II) ==
=== 2010–2012 Ford Shelby GT500 ===
2010–2012 Ford Shelby GT500
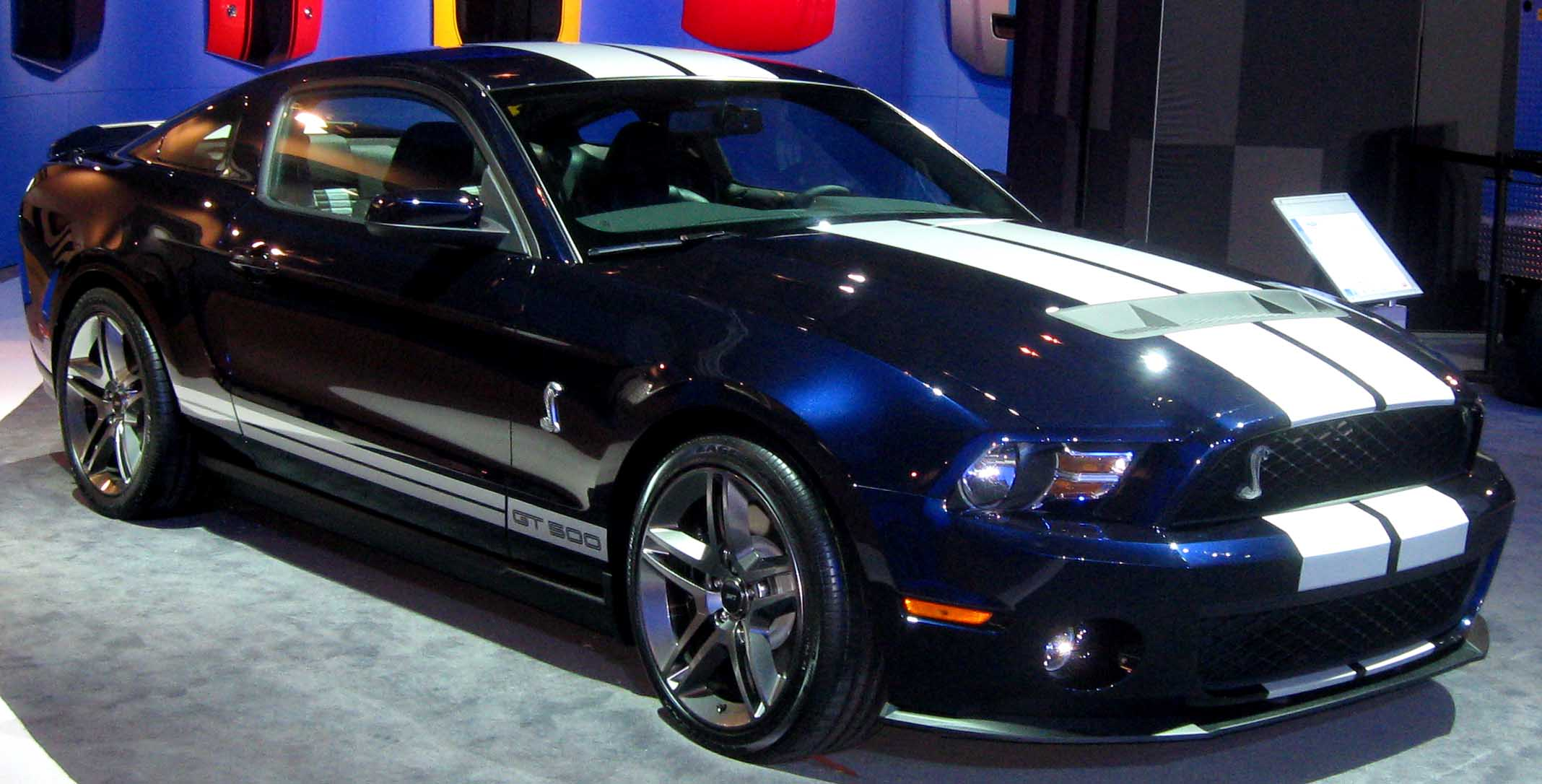

Overview
- Production: 2009–2012
- Model years: 2010–2012

Body and chassis
- Body style: 2-door convertible; 2-door coupe

Powertrain
- Engine: 5.4 L Modular 4-valve Supercharged V8
- Transmission: Tremec TR-6060 6-speed manual

Dimensions
- Length: 188.1 in (4,778 mm)
- Width: 73.9 in (1,877 mm)
- Height: Coupe: 55.6 in (1,412 mm); Convertible: 56.1 in (1,425 mm)Aluminum block

Chronology
- Predecessor: 2007–2009 Ford Shelby GT500
- Successor: 2013–14 Ford Shelby GT500

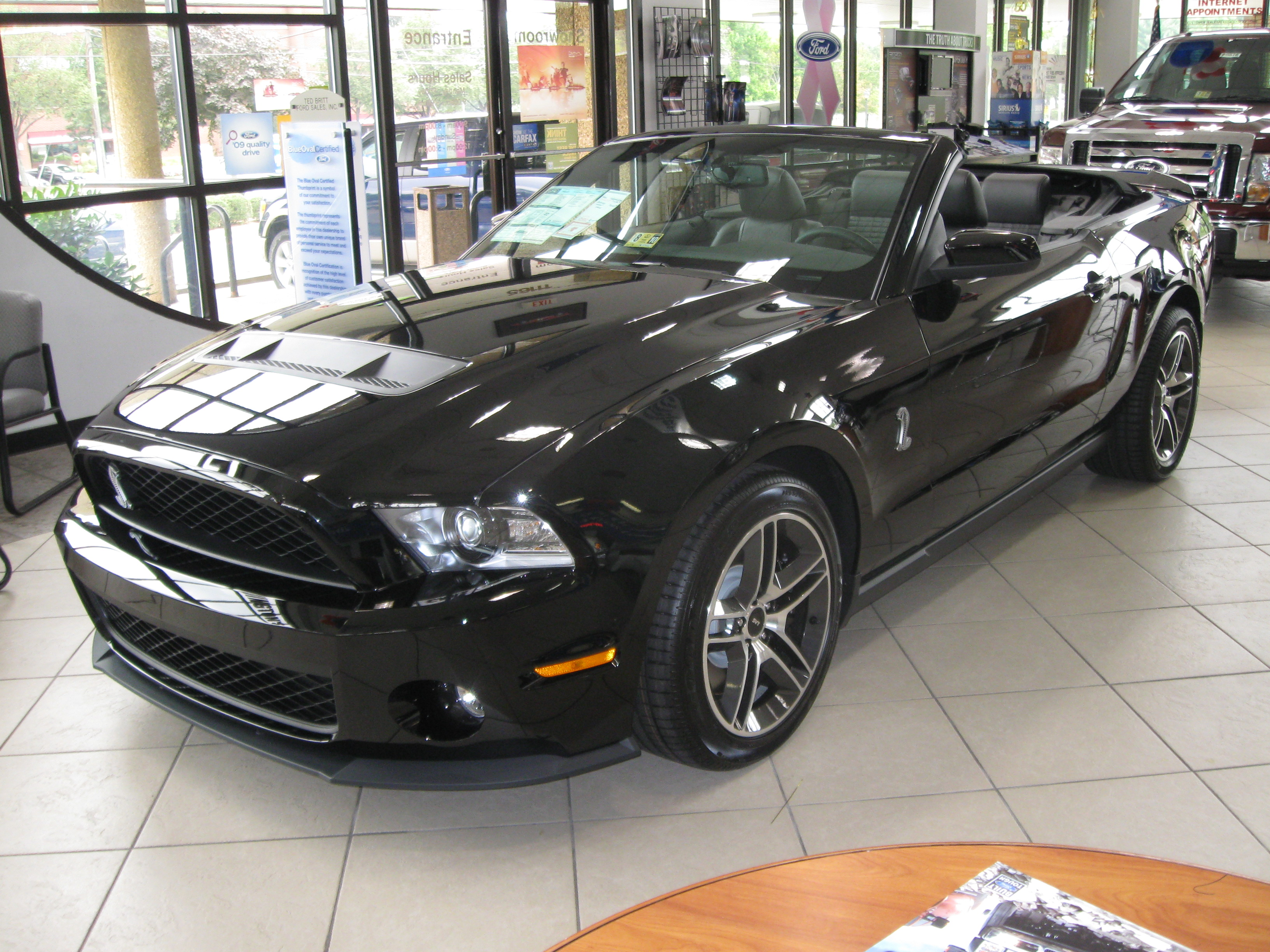
GT500 convertible

==== 2010 ====
For the 2010 model year, the Shelby Mustang GT500 was redesigned along with the base Ford Mustang. As with the 2007–09 GT500, the 2010 included unique front and rear fascias, hood with functional vents and unique rear spoiler. The rear spoiler included a functional Gurney flap. Along with new exterior colors, customers had the option of extending the exterior stripes onto the seats. Production was limited to 2000 units.

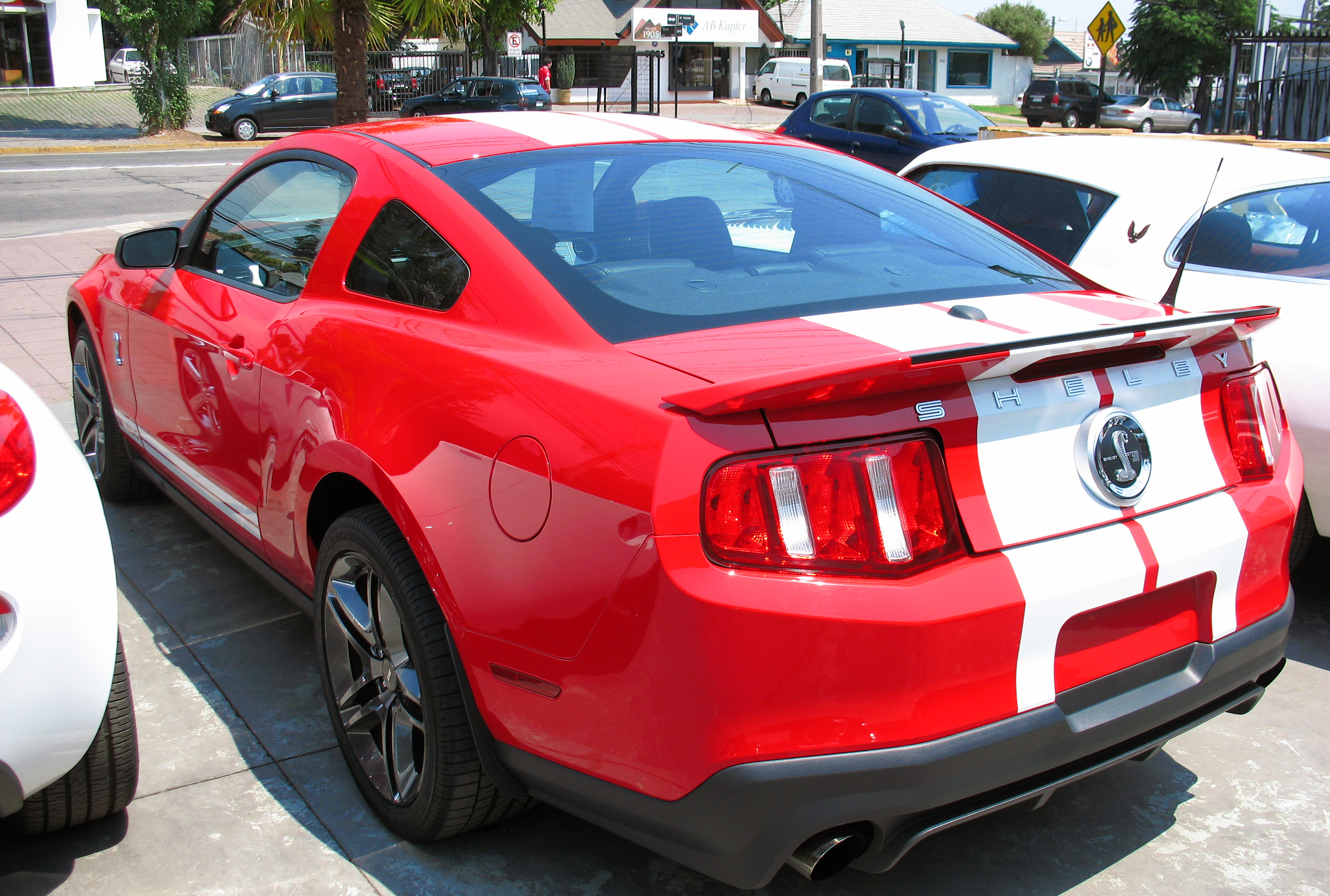
Rear view of the GT500

The 5.4 L engine's power output was increased to 540 hp (403 kW) and 510 lb⋅ft (691 N⋅m) of torque with the addition of a cold air intake similar to the 08/09 GT500KR and includes a knock sensor to protect the engine if lower octane fuel is used. The 2010 GT500's fuel efficiency increased by 2 miles per gallon.

SVT re-tuned the coupe's suspension and worked with Goodyear on 19" tires with new construction, compound and tread pattern. The coupe's 19-inch wheels are forged for a reduction in unsprung weight. The convertible retained the 18-inch wheels. The 2010 Shelby Mustang GT500 can accelerate from 0 to 60 mph (0 to 97 km/h) in 4.19 seconds and has a top speed of 180 mph (290 km/h). The 2010 GT500 can brake from 60–0 mph in 107.0 ft and has a lateral acceleration of 1.00 G.

==== 2011 and 2012 ====
Much like the 2011 V6 and GT Mustangs, the 2011 Shelby GT500 got an engine update with an all-new 5.4 L aluminum engine which was 102 lb (46 kg) lighter than the previous cast-iron engine and uses Ford-patented plasma-coating technology (Plasma transferred wire arc). The inventors of PTWA received the 2009 IPO National Inventor of the Year award. This technology was initially patented and developed by inventors from Flame-Spray. The technology was subsequently improved upon by Ford and Flamespray. With the engine updates, not only has performance improved to 550 bhp (558 PS; 410 kW) at 6,200 rpm and 510 lb⋅ft (691 N⋅m) at 4,500 rpm of torque, but the GT500's gas mileage has improved to 15 mpg_{‑US} (16 L/100 km; 18 mpg_{‑imp}) city and 23 mpg_{‑US} (10 L/100 km; 28 mpg_{‑imp}) highway, which was enough to eliminate the U.S. Gas Guzzler Tax. The final production number of the 2011 Shelby GT500 by the end of the year was 5100 units.

Ford also improved upon the handling characteristics of the GT500. The overall stance of the car has been lowered by 11 millimeters in front and 8 millimeters at the rear. The car also features Ford's new Electric Power Assist Steering (EPAS) that improves torque build-up and road feel which delivers quicker and more precise steering, increased effort on the racetrack or winding roads, and reduced effort in low-speed parking maneuvers. The car also has Ford's AdvanceTrac stability control system, which features a sport mode when pressed twice consecutively while stopped with the brakes applied.

External improvements include an optional SVT Performance Package, which includes Goodyear EagleF1 SuperCar G: 2 tires, all-new lightweight 19-inch forged-aluminum wheels in front and 20-inch forged-aluminum wheels at the rear, a 3.73 rear axle ratio, and performance tuned front and rear shocks along with stiffer springs. The package includes a unique rear spoiler Gurney Flap for improved handling, slightly revised front and rear fascias, a new pedal box for improved clutch use, slotted brake dust shields for improved brake cooling, standard HID (high-intensity discharge) headlamps, MyKey programmable vehicle key, integrated spotter mirrors, and fold-down rear headrests. Optional is a glass top roof, previously available, starting in 2009, with the Mustang GT.

The improvements in handling and performance gives the 2011 Shelby GT500 a skidpad rating of 1.0g, and a Virginia International Raceway lap time of 2:58:48, making it as fast as, and sometimes faster than, cars such as the M3, Audi R8 V10, Dodge Viper SRT-10 and Porsche GT3 around this racetrack. Changes to the 2012 model year Shelby GT500 included a new Recaro seat option. The Sterling Gray color was no longer available.

=== 2011–2012 GT500 Super Snake ===
Just like the 2011 Shelby GT500, born on the proving grounds of the drag strip and road course at Las Vegas Motor Speedway, Shelby American worked with companies like Ford Racing to create an even more aggressive suspension and engine package for the 2011 Super Snake. For the 2011 model year, more power, new anthracite wheels, white stripes and new side scoops are optional.

The 2011 Ford Shelby GT500 Super Snake post title package includes:

- Ford Racing handling pack including dynamic adjustable dampers, lowering springs, tuned stabilizer bars, and front strut tower brace
- 6-speed manual transmission with 3.73:1 rear axle ratio
- Shelby/Ford Racing supercharger upgrade producing over 660 HP and 590 ft.-lbs. of torque
- Either a Shelby/Ford Racing or Shelby/Kenne Bell supercharger kit producing 750 HP with upgraded drive shaft, billet twin 75mm throttle body and exclusive badges
- Optional Shelby/Kenne Bell 800 horsepower tune on pump gas
- Borla exhaust system
- An optional Shelby / Eibach handling pack is also available
- Shelby-designed Alcoa 20-inch wheels in durabright or anthracite
- Short-throw shifter
- Forged Shelby / Wilwood brakes with 6-piston calipers and cross drilled / vented rotors
- Front brake cooling ducts and behind the door side scoop
- Unique fiberglass hood featuring classic Shelby design and pins
- Shelby signature Super Snake stripes in either matte black or matte white
- "Shelby" lettering across the rear deck lid
- "Super Snake" vehicle badges and official Shelby CSM interior plate
- Optional two-tone leather interior
- Shelby signature embroidered headrests, floor mats and other Shelby designed components

==== 2012 Limited Edition ====
Full details on the 2012 Shelby GT500 Super Snake were revealed at the New York Auto Show. The package included a unique fiberglass hood featuring the iconic Shelby design and pins, a new Borla exhaust system, the Shelby signature Super Snake stripes that come in either matte black or matte white, and "Super Snake" vehicle badges. An official Shelby CSM interior plate and "Shelby" lettering across the rear deck lid allowed the GT500 to be fully recognizable as a Shelby vehicle, while a set of Shelby designed 20-inch Alcoa wheels that came with a choice of either durabright or anthracite finished off the exterior look.

The interior also included Shelby signature embroidered headrests and floor mats, along with other Shelby designed components. These signatures could also be applied to optional two-tone leather.

The 2012 Limited Edition Super Snake produces 750 hp (559 kW) and 590 lb⋅ft (800 N⋅m) of torque from its 5.4 L supercharged V8 engine. The power can be taken up to 800 hp (597 kW) with the optional upgrade. The engine is mated to a six-speed manual transmission with 3.73:1 rear axle ratio and short-throw shifter. The car uses forged Shelby/Baer brakes with 6-piston calipers and cross drilled/vented rotors.

==== 2012 50th Anniversary Edition ====
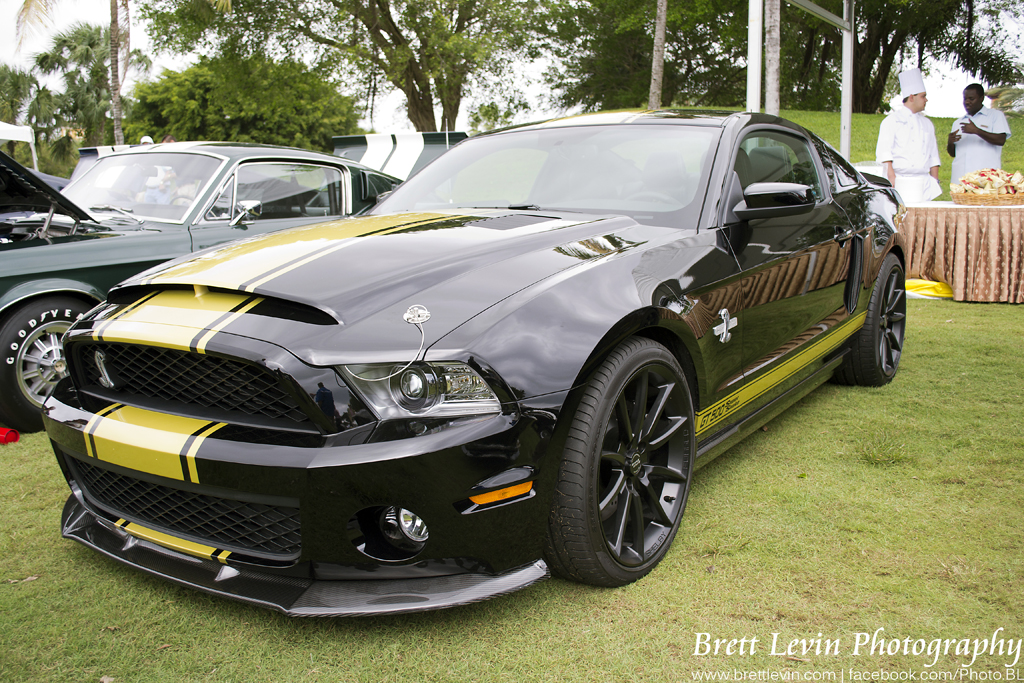
50th Anniversary Edition Super Snake

To celebrate the 50th anniversary of Shelby American, 50 black and gold Super Snakes were manufactured. The prototype was used as a promotional vehicle and is considered a highly sought-after car by collectors. The prototype had been reported as sold in 2015.

=== 2011/12 Shelby American Shelby 1000 ===
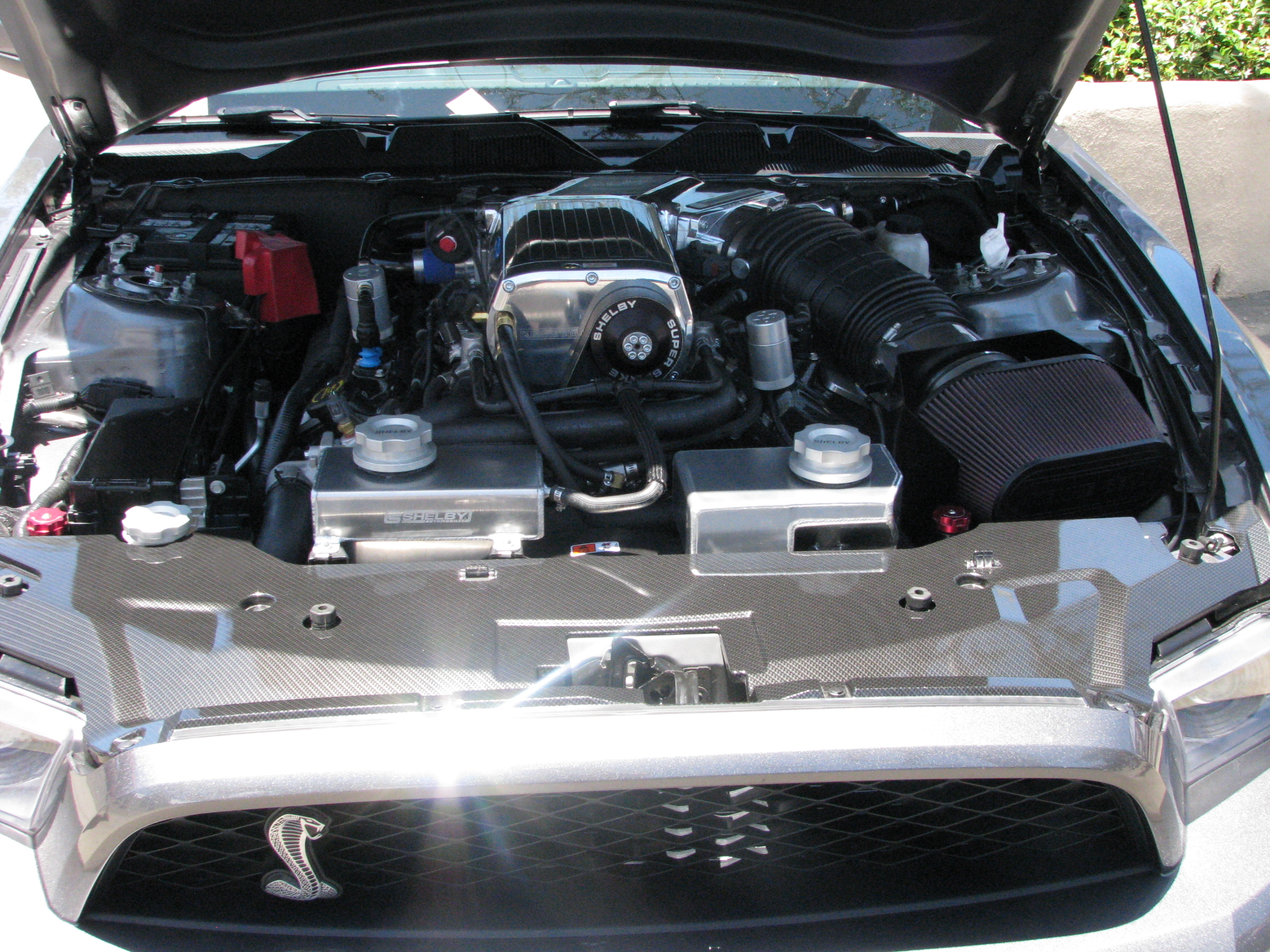
Engine

Unveiled at the 2012 New York International Auto Show, the Shelby 1000 is an upgrade to the 2012 Shelby GT500 and was available in two versions. The Street Legal version produces 920 hp (686 kW), while the Track version delivers 1,100 hp (820 kW). The chassis has been strengthened to handle the additional power. The rear end was replaced with a high performance 9-inch unit; the brakes included 6 pistons in front and 4 pistons out back. The driveshaft was a stronger unit while the suspension included new struts, sway bars and bushings. The hood, rear panel and splitter were functional pieces for performance.

=== 2013–2014 Ford Shelby GT500 ===
2013–2014 Ford Shelby GT500
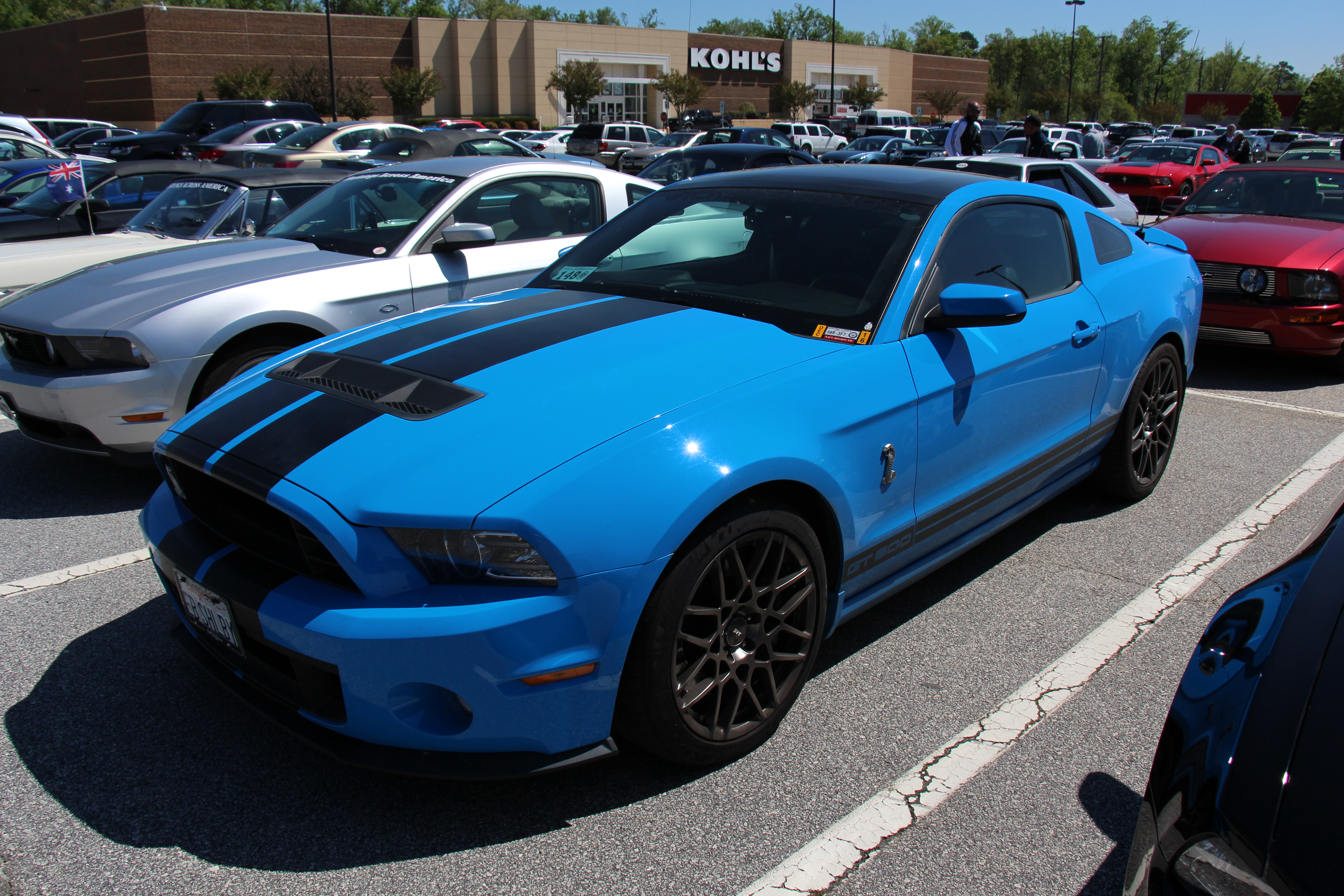

Overview
- Production: May 2012 – June 2014
- Model years: 2013–2014

Body and chassis
- Body style: 2-door coupe; 2-door convertible

Powertrain
- Engine: 5.8 L "Trinity" DOHC 4 valves × cyl. supercharged V8
- Transmission: Tremec TR-6060 6-speed manual

Dimensions
- Wheelbase: 107.1 inches (2,720 mm)
- Length: 189.4 in (4,811 mm)
- Width: 73.9 in (1,877 mm) (Excluding mirrors); 80.1 in (2,035 mm) (Including mirrors)
- Height: Coupe: 55.1 in (1,400 mm); Convertible: 55.4 in (1,407 mm)
- Curb weight: Coupe: 3,845 lb (1,744 kg); Convertible: 3,982 lb (1,806 kg)

Chronology
- Predecessor: 2010–2012 Ford Shelby GT500

First unveiled at the Los Angeles Auto Show in November 2011, Ford Shelby GT500 was the most powerful Mustang at the time. The DOHC 4 valves per cylinder 5,812 cc (5.8 L; 354.7 cu in) supercharged and intercooled V8 engine is certified to produce 662 bhp (671 PS; 494 kW) at 6,500 rpm and 855 N⋅m (631 lb⋅ft) at 4,000 rpm of torque, with a claimed top speed of 202 mph (325 km/h). The new GT500 weighs 3,850 lb (1,746 kg), and was available from May 2012.

The 2013 models had various improvements and differences compared to the GT500 of 2012 including new front end sheet metal along with standard HID headlamps, along with a new LED tail light assembly. The new 2013 Shelby GT500 also had no grille, due to the massive amount of cooling required for the vehicle. Performance changes included twin fuel pumps (a Mustang GT's single supply pump, twice over), larger fuel injectors, a grippier and larger-diameter clutch, a larger fan, a three-row intercooler (the previous car used a double-row unit), a beefed-up Tremec TR-6060 six-speed manual transmission with an internal oil pump, and a single-piece carbon-fiber driveshaft. Larger Brembo front disc brakes with six-piston calipers, reinforced axle tubes, and aero tweaks to help the car reach 200 mph (320 km/h)+ safely. According to Ford, the changes have resulted in a 14-percent reduction in drag and a 66-percent increase in front-end downforce. Also new for 2013 was a larger front anti-roll bar and retuned springs. An rpm-adjustable electronic launch-control function was standard, as was a four-mode electronic stability control system.

A Performance package was also offered, adding two-mode adjustable Bilstein dampers and a Torsen limited-slip rear differential. In addition to the Performance package, a Track package for road racing could be ordered bringing a transmission cooler, a nose-mounted differential cooler for the Torsen limited-slip unit, and an air-to-oil engine-oil cooler.

A Motor Trend magazine May 2012 road test provided a 0–60 mph (97 km/h) acceleration time of 3.5 seconds and a quarter mile time of 11.6 seconds at 125.7 mph (202.3 km/h). By comparison, the '13 GT500 was faster than both the Camaro ZL1 and Corvette Z06.

Performance claims include a manufacturer's claim of 202 mph (325 km/h); Car and Driver: 189 mph (304 km/h)).2013 Shelby Mustang GT500 performance analysis

In February 2012, at the Chicago Auto Show, Shelby officially announced that a convertible version of the 2013 GT500 will reach production. The convertible had a limited top speed of 155 miles per hour (249 km/h).

No major changes from the previous year 2013 were made for the 2014 model year, however several colors had been discontinued and been made.

=== 2013–2014 Shelby GT500 Super Snake ===
2013–2014 Shelby GT500 Super Snake

Overview
- Production: 2013–2015
- Model years: 2013–2014

Body and chassis
- Body style: 2-door coupe; 2-door convertible
- Related: 2013–2014 Ford Shelby GT500

Powertrain
- Engine: 5.8 L "Trinity" supercharged V8
- Transmission: 6-speed manual

Dimensions
- Wheelbase: 107.1 in (2,720 mm)
- Curb weight: 3,929 lb (1,782 kg)

Chronology
- Successor: 2015–2016 Shelby Super Snake

At the Barrett-Jackson auction in 2012, Shelby American announced the release of the GT500 Super Snake. The Super Snake is offered in two supercharged engine packages which have power outputs of 662 hp (494 kW) and 850 hp (634 kW) respectively. The first fifty vehicles sold were available in limited edition colors, either in black with a triple gold stripe or white with a triple gold stripe.

The 2013 GT500 Super Snake marked the discontinuation of the Shelby "Alcoa" Super Snake Wheels. New, lightweight forged aluminum wheel were produced and used instead. These wheels were also used on any GT500 (even 2007–2012 models) that entered the Shelby American Facility to be converted into a Super Snake version. The 2013 Super Snake was also offered with a wide body option.

==== WELD Edition concept ====
The WELD edition Super Snake had new wheels designed specifically and exclusively for Shelby and will be used on the next generations of Shelby Mustangs. This car was in the Weld wheels SEMA show display. The hood of this WELD Super Snake is an all carbon fiber Super Snake hood. It also has carbon fiber trim parts, included side rocker panels, rear diffuser, spoiler and rear fenders. Parts that featured WELD are its vinyl strips and Recaro seats.

==== Wide Body Prototype ====
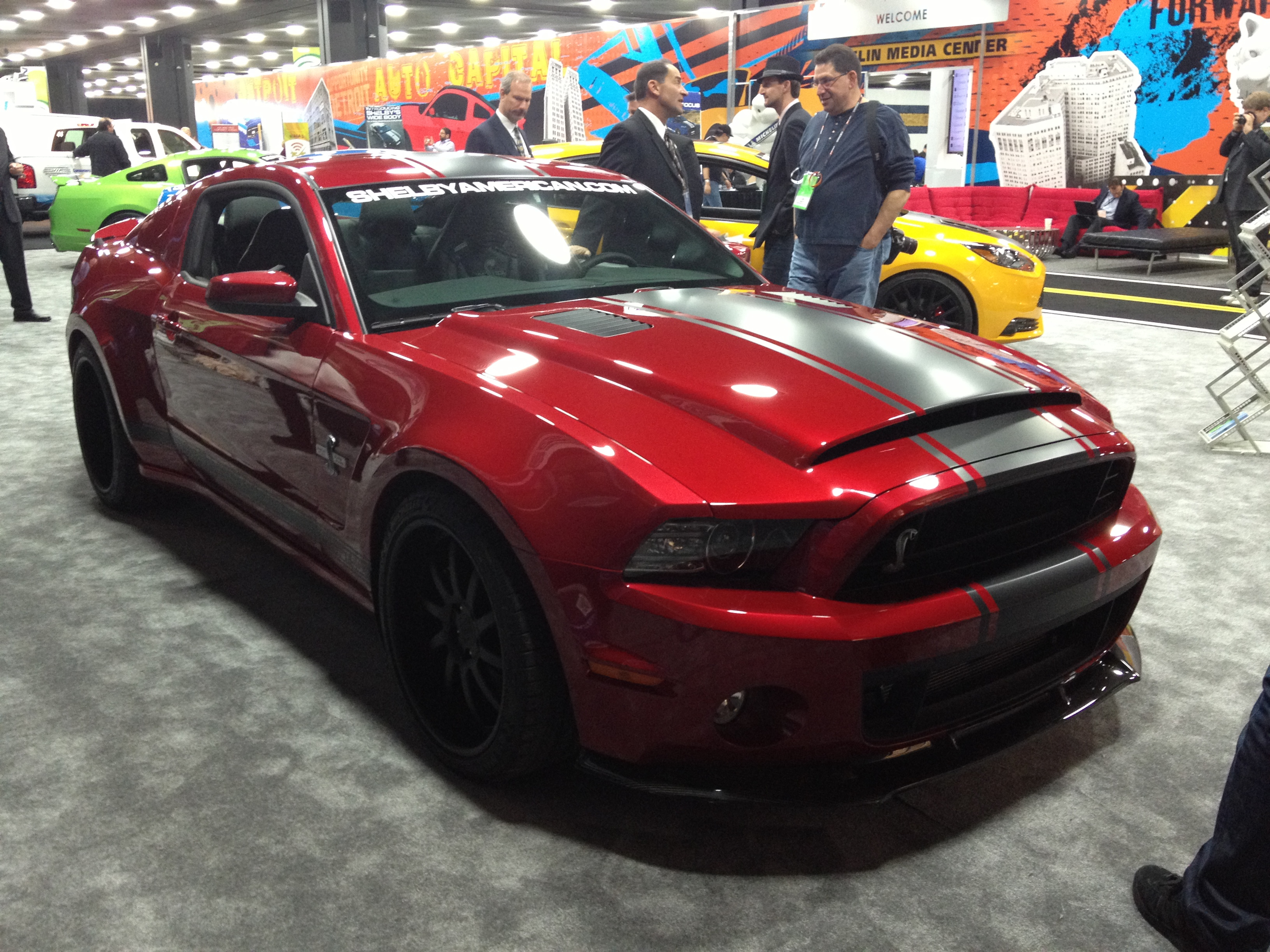
Wide Body Edition

This car was the first of the latest generation wide body Super Snakes. CSM13SS0001P was one of the key development vehicles for the wide body program as well as the Super Snake program for 2013. It appeared on both the wide body and many of the Super Snake promotional materials and displays during this time period. It was previously shown at the Detroit Auto Show in 2013 and the New York Auto Show, as well as many other shows and events all over US. It was also in the Shelby Annual publication. This prototype is currently on display in the Shelby Museum.

==== Demonstrator Edition of Shelby American ====
This demonstrator of Shelby American was used as part of a ride-n-drive to help show drivers the primary difference between the stock GT500 and the GT500 Super Snake. The conversion includes 850HP, courtesy of a 4.0L Whipple Supercharger, and comes with the optional Watts link and upgraded interior.

=== 2013–2014 Shelby 1000 and 1000 S/C ===
The 2013 Shelby 1000 was officially unveiled at the New York International Auto Show, under once again a Street Package, and a Track Package (S/C).

The 2013/14 Shelby 1000 had the 351 cu in (5.8 L) V8 engine from the 2013/14 GT500. Upgrades included a full Engine Package using a performance 850 hp (630 kW) fuel system with 72 lb (33 kg) injectors, a Borla Custom 3 in (76 mm) stainless-steel catback exhaust and new parts such as forged pistons, ported cylinder heads, titanium valve springs and titanium retainers. The engine breathes through a Kenne Bell 3.6 L supercharger using a 4.5 in (110 mm) inlet pipe feeding an 1,850 cu ft/min (870 L/s) throttle body. A High Performance aluminum flywheel and a twin-clutch assembly is also used. The engine is estimated to produce over 1,200 hp (890 kW).

Like the 2012 Shelby 1000, the 2013/14 needed significant under-body and chassis strengthening modifications to handle the extra power from the engine. Driveshaft tunnel braces and billet-aluminium supports and suspension parts were used. A Custom 9" Wavetrac Differential is used to help put power down through the rear wheels.

The Exterior received the usual "Shelby 1000" decals and an overlay package with a functional carbon-fiber hood, front lip spoiler, rear bumper and side skirts. A Widebody Version of the car was also offered.

Since 2011, Shelby 1000 become a package for 2010-14's Ford Shelby GT500, due to the popularity of the package, Shelby American also received 2013–14 Ford Shelby GT500s to be converted into Shelby 1000s from customers.

== Ford Performance 3rd generation Shelby GT350 (2015–2020) ==
=== 2015 Ford Shelby GT350 ===
2016 Ford Shelby GT350
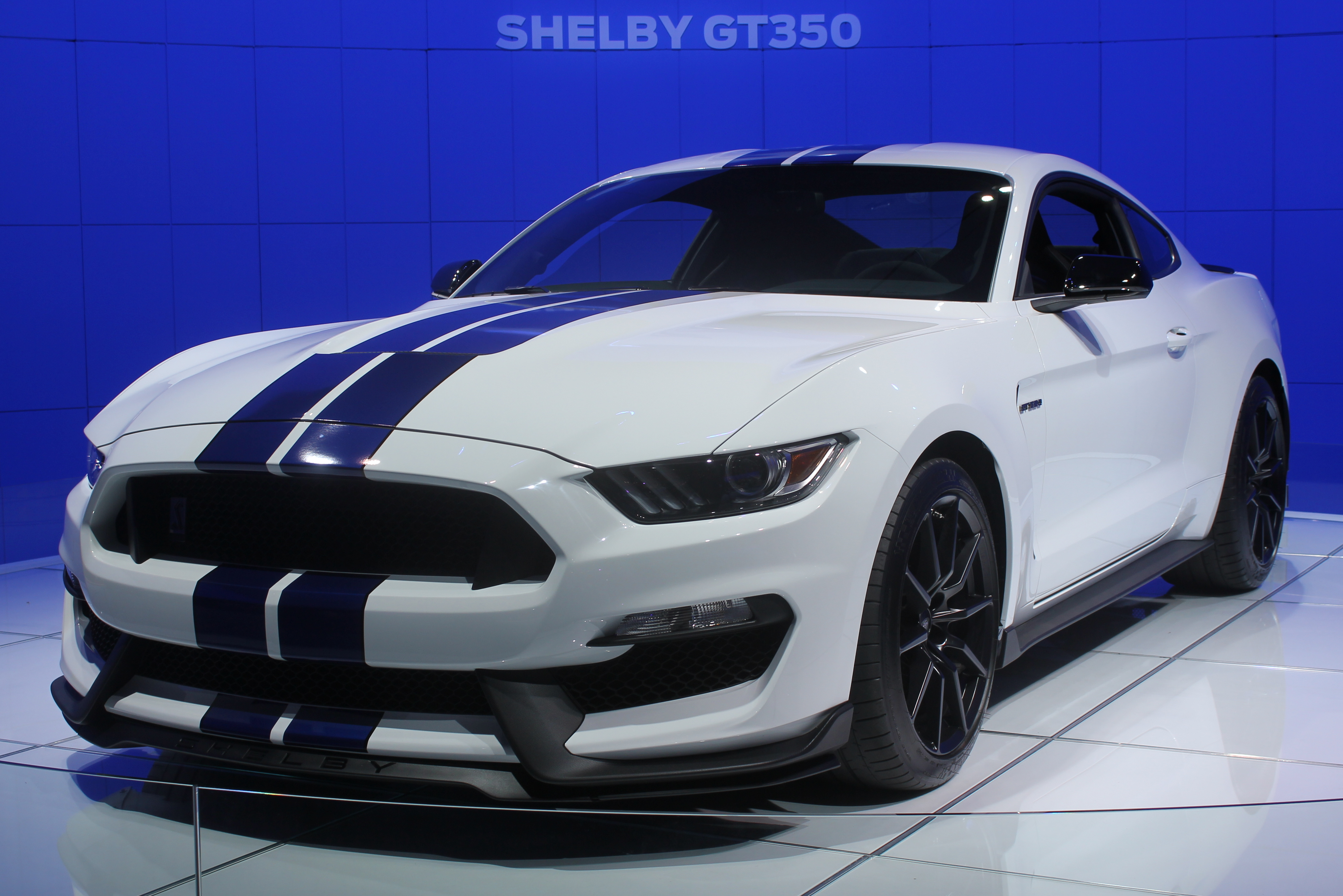

Overview
- Also called: Ford Mustang GT350
- Production: 2015–2020
- Model years: 2015–2020

Body and chassis
- Body style: 2-door fastback coupe

Powertrain
- Engine: 5.2 L "Voodoo" V8
- Transmission: Tremec TR-3160 6-speed manual

Dimensions
- Wheelbase: 107.1 in (2,720 mm)
- Length: 188.3 in (4,783 mm); 189.7 in (4,818 mm) (GT350R)
- Width: 75.9 in (1,928 mm) (Excluding mirrors); 81.9 in (2,080 mm) (Including mirrors)
- Height: 54.4 in (1,382 mm); 53.6 in (1,361 mm) (GT350R)
- Curb weight: 3,760 lb (1,706 kg) (Standard); 3,798 lb (1,723 kg) (Tech package); 3,791 lb (1,720 kg) (Track package); GT350R: 3,655 lb (1,658 kg) (Standard); 3,703 lb (1,680 kg) (Electronics package)

For 2015, the GT350 has a 5,163 cc (5.2 L; 315.1 cu in) flat-plane crank V8 engine, known as Voodoo producing 526 bhp (533 PS; 392 kW) at 7,500 rpm and 429 lb⋅ft (582 N⋅m) of torque at 4,750 rpm. The GT350 is more track focused than the GT500, and was benchmarked against the Chevrolet Corvette C7, Porsche 911 S and BMW M4. It has a track-focused chassis tuning, wider front fenders housing 295-width Michelin Pilot Super Sport tires, significant aerodynamic changes to include lowering the hood around the engine, active-exhaust, six-piston Brembo brakes with semi-floating rotors, MagneRide damping option (the first MagneRide-equipped Ford), light weight Tremec six speed manual transmission, Recaro seats and various weight reduction efforts. Specifically, it has a carbon fiber reinforced polymer radiator support that directs cooling channels for various components.

The GT350 and GT350R were discontinued after model year 2020.

==== GT350R ====
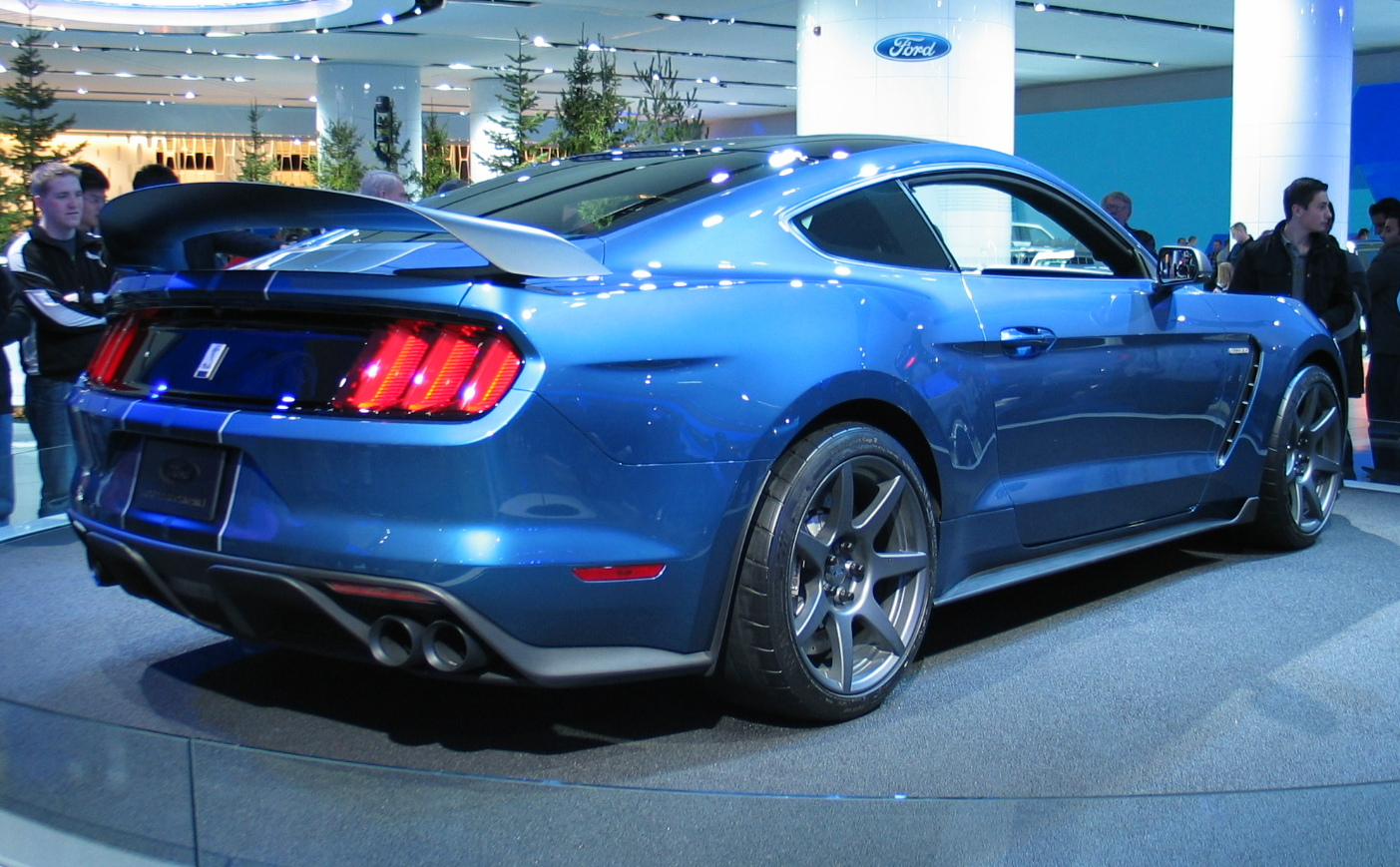
2016 Shelby GT350R rear

At the 2015 North American International Auto Show a more track-focused, hardcore and limited production version of the GT350 was unveiled called the GT350R, benchmarked against the Chevrolet Camaro Z28 and Porsche 911 GT3. The GT350R retains the GT350's 5.2-liter flat plane crank V8 engine, producing the same power, but grip was significantly increased by the means of wider Michelin Pilot Sport Cup 2 tires, Carbon Revolution carbon fiber wheels (the first ever fitted to a mass-production road car) each weigh approximately 15 pounds less than the aluminum wheels on the GT350, and significantly more downforce thanks to a larger splitter and carbon-fiber rear wing to keep the car stuck to the ground. Items like the air conditioning, stereo, trunk floorboard, all the carpeting, the rear seats, and the backup camera could be removed from the factory resulting in the GT350R weighing 130 lb (59 kg) less than the GT350.

Serial #001 was sold at the 2015 Barrett-Jackson Scottsdale Auction for US$1,000,000 (~$1.33 million in 2025) with the proceeds to benefit the JDRF.

The GT350R won Road & Track magazine's 2016 "Performance Car of the Year" (PCOTY) and Car and Driver magazine's "10 Best Cars" for 2016.

==== GT350R-C ====
As with previous production-based Mustang race cars, Multimatic Engineering was approached by Ford Performance to develop a complete race-only version of the S550 Shelby GT350R. The resulting competition derivative, the GT350R-C, has safety equipment and roll-over protection homologated to FIA and IMSA specifications; Bosch MS5.0 ECU and ABS controller; MoTeC instrumentation and datalogging; adjustable anti-roll bars; Multimatic DSSV spool-valve dampers and other competition upgrades.

Though delayed until the third race of the 2015 Continental Tire SportsCar Challenge, the GT350R-C was competitive right away: having earned pole position for its debut race, the GT350R-C won the next two rounds, and took three wins overall in its debut season.

Success continued into 2016 as privateer team C360R finished behind the sole entry of factory-supported team Multimatic Motorsports for a 1–2 GT350R-C finish in the season-opener at Daytona. The #15 Multimatic Motorsports Shelby GT350R-C driven by Billy Johnson and Scott Maxwell continued on to win 6 out of 10 races as well as the 2016 Team, Driver, and Manufacturers Championships.

=== 2019 Shelby GT350 ===
The GT350 was updated for the 2019 model year. The update includes new suspension, aerodynamics, and bespoke Michelin summer tires. The updated rear wing has an optional Gurney flap, helping downforce without adding too much drag. The other aerodynamics update is out front. The GT350 now gets the grille from the GT350R, which has fewer openings, creating less front-end drag. The GT350 also moved to the 5.2L engine block, cylinder head, and valve train from the GT500 to reduce overall costs.

In order to improve corner grip and braking, Ford commissioned a custom set of Michelin Pilot Sport Cup 2 tires that have a model-specific tread pattern and compound. The tires are 295/35R19 front section and 305/35R19 rear section, the same as the previous model. The springs and shocks have been revised — 10 percent softer in the rear and 10 percent firmer in the front. The tuning for the Magneride system, ABS, and electronic power steering system have also been revised. The GT350R also receives the high-tail steering knuckle from the 2020 GT500 as well as a new steering rack.

The 2019 GT350 also gets updated in the interior and exterior. Power adjustable seats with faux-suede inserts are available, along with faux suede inserts on the doors. An optional 12-speaker Bang & Olufsen Play sound system is also available as the Tech Packages, which also includes puddle lamps, blind-spot monitoring, and cross-traffic alert The GT350 now comes standard with the 8-inch SYNC 3 touchscreen infotainment and dual-zone climate control. The new colors were also introduced: Velocity Blue and Ford Performance Blue. An exposed carbon fiber dashboard is an available option. The 2019 GT350 went on sale in early 2019.

=== 2020 Shelby GT350 ===
The GT350 only had minor updates for the 2020 model year. These upgrades include updated suspension tuning and new colors (Grabber Lime, Twister Orange (replacing Orange Fury), Iconic Silver, Rapid Red (replacing Ruby Red)). The 2020 also introduced a new option, the Heritage Edition Package celebrating 55 years of track focused Mustang Fastbacks, which includes Wimbledon White paint with unique Guardsman Blue Over-the-Top racing stripes, not available on other GT350s.

=== 2020 Shelby GT350SE ===
To commemorate 55 years since the first Shelby Mustang, Shelby American created Carroll Shelby Signature Edition versions of the 2015–2020 Shelby GT350 and Shelby GT350R.

== Ford Performance 3rd generation Shelby GT500 (2020–2022) ==
2020 Ford Shelby GT500
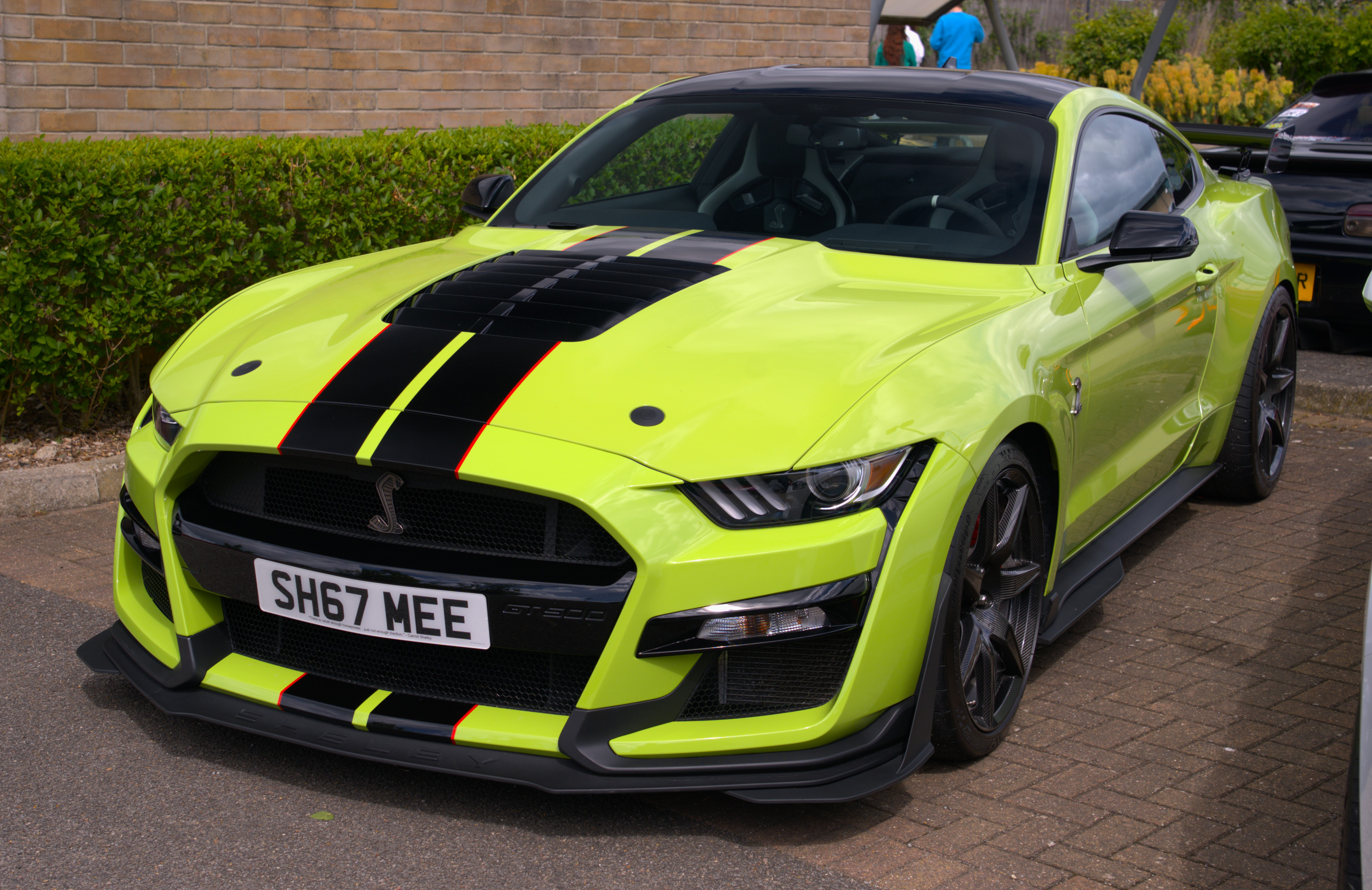

Overview
- Also called: Ford Mustang Shelby GT500
- Production: 2019–2022
- Model years: 2020–2022
- Assembly: United States: Flat Rock, Michigan (Flat Rock Assembly Plant); Enterprise, Nevada (Shelby American)
- Designer: Chris Stevens

Body and chassis
- Body style: 2-door fastback coupe

Powertrain
- Engine: 5.2L "Predator" Cross-Plane Crank Supercharged V8
- Transmission: Tremec TR-9070 DCT 7-speed

Dimensions
- Wheelbase: 107 in (2,718 mm)
- Length: 190.2 in (4,831 mm)
- Width: 76.6 in (1,946 mm) (Excluding mirrors); 81.9 in (2,080 mm) (Including mirrors)
- Height: 54.3 in (1,379 mm)

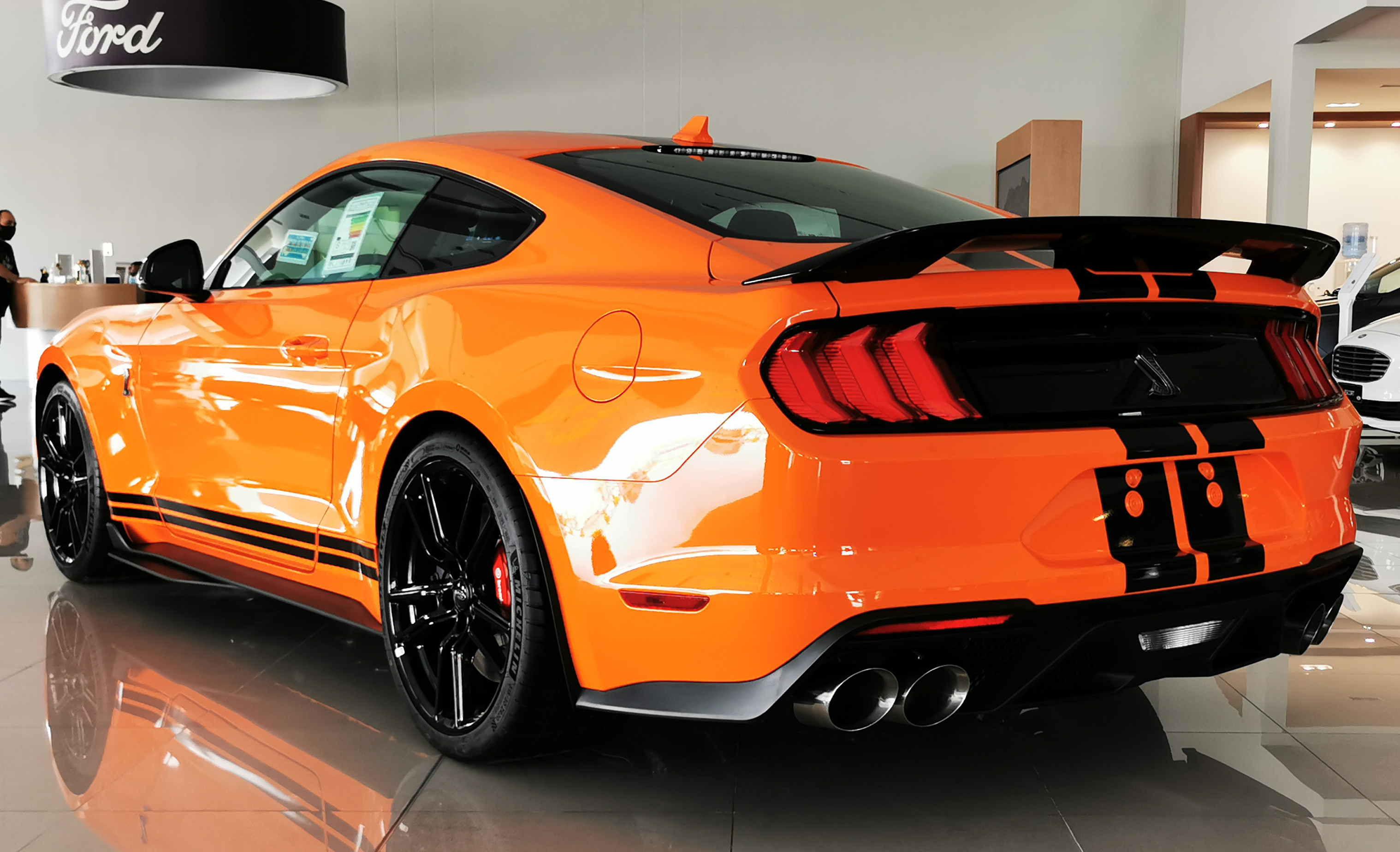
2021 Shelby GT500 rear

=== 2020 Shelby GT500 ===
The 2020 GT500 was unveiled at the January 2019 North American International Auto Show in Detroit. It is powered by a hand-built 5.2-liter "Predator" aluminum-alloy V8 engine with a 2.65-liter roots-type supercharger. The Shelby GT500 produces 760 hp (567 kW; 771 PS) and 625 lb⋅ft (847 N⋅m) of torque. However, it will not arrive to the European market due to the V8 5.2 liter motor being unable to comply with European road regulations, therefore it will only focus on North America and Middle Eastern countries.

The Michelin PS4S tires are upgraded to Michelin Pilot Sport Cup 2 with the GT500 Carbon Fiber Track Pack.

In September 2021, the GT500 was introduced in the Philippines, featuring the same 5.2 liter supercharged V8 that produces 760 hp (567 kW) and 625 lbf⋅ft (847 N⋅m) of torque. It is mated to a seven-speed Tremec-sourced DCT.

=== 2020–2022 Shelby GT500 Signature Edition ===
Shelby American released the signature edition of GT500 with an additional 40 horsepower.

=== 2020–2022 Shelby GT500KR ===
On December 15, 2021, Shelby revealed the GT500KR on social media for their 60th Anniversary. The car is limited to 180 units worldwide.

=== 2020–2022 Shelby GT500 Code Red ===
The first experimental car from Shelby which found its way to production. The car has a high-performance 5.2 L V8 boosted by a twin-turbo system, which contributes to a final output of over 1,000 hp (750 kW) with 93-octane fuel and up to 1,300 hp (970 kW) while running on ethanol. Shelby will produce 10 cars per year.

== Other variants and replicas ==
=== Eleanor Mustang ===
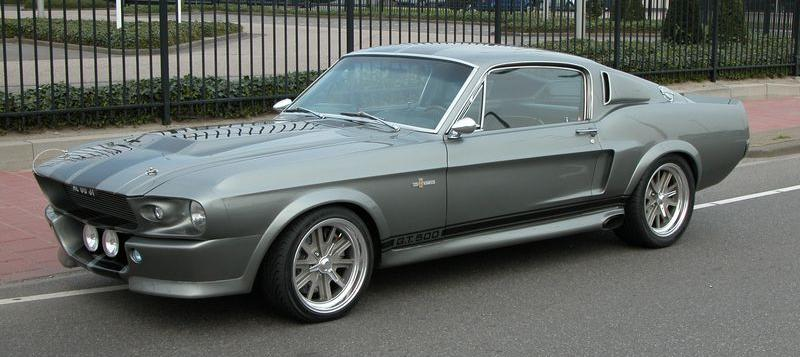
Eleanor in Gone in 60 Seconds

The Eleanor is a customized Mustang appearing in two movies, Gone in 60 Seconds (1974) and Gone in 60 Seconds (2000). In the 1974 movie, it is a 1971 Ford Mustang that was redressed as 1973 model, while in the 2000 movie it was a custom Dupont Pepper Grey 1967 Mustang Fastback depicted as a Shelby GT500. The 2000 model had a nitrous oxide system.

== Controversies ==
=== Unique Performance ===
In 2002, Carroll Shelby partnered with Unique Performance which was reported to have been mismanaged and performed poorly with numerous customer complaints regarding false claims as to specifications and parts, poor workmanship and failure to deliver.

On November 1, 2007, Unique Performance (constructing both Shelby and Chip Foose licensed Mustangs and Camaros) was raided by the Farmers Branch Police Department due to VIN irregularities (cars which have a number of VINs in various locations had VINs removed and moved illegally) and subsequently declared bankruptcy with all assets including numerous body shells and cars in construction auctioned off ending production.

=== Denice Halicki and Gone in 60 Seconds ===
The 2000 remake of the movie Gone in 60 Seconds had a custom 1967 Mustang 'Eleanor'. Carroll Shelby started to produce his own version of Eleanor, but Denice Halicki, widow of the original Eleanor's creator, filed suit against Carroll Shelby for infringing on the "Eleanor" trademark and copyrighted image. In 2008, Halicki won her case against Carroll Shelby. In 2022, the Shelby Estate won a case against Halicki, where it was decided "Eleanor" is not a character deserving of copyright protection.

== See also ==
- AC Cobra (Shelby Cobra)
- Ford Shelby Cobra Concept
