= Ford Mustang SVT Cobra =

High-performance Mustang model by SVT

Ford SVT Mustang Cobra
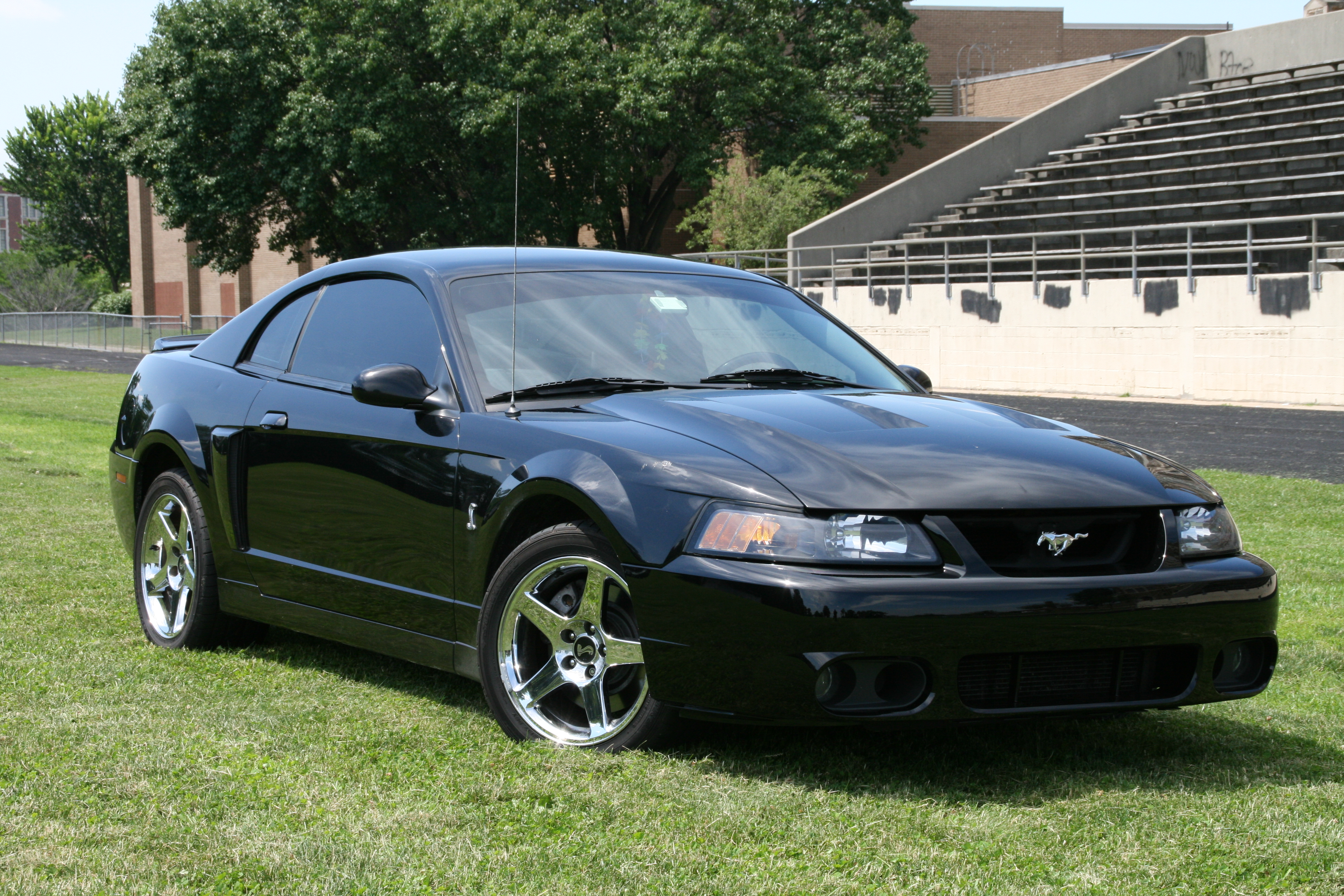
- 2004 Ford Mustang SVT Cobra

Overview
- Manufacturer: SVT (Ford)
- Production: 1993–2004 (79,958 produced); 2027 (to commence)
- Assembly: United States: Dearborn, Michigan (Dearborn Assembly Plant)

Body and chassis
- Class: Pony car muscle car
- Body style: 1993: 3-door hatchback 1994–2004: 2-door coupe; 2-door convertible
- Layout: Front-engine, rear-wheel drive
- Platform: Ford Fox platform (1993); SN-95 (1994-2004)

Chronology
- Successor: Ford Shelby Mustang GT500

The Ford SVT Mustang Cobra (also known as "SVT Mustang Cobra, SVT Cobra," or simply as "Cobra") is a pony car that was built by American automobile manufacturer Ford Motor Company's Special Vehicle Team division (or SVT) for the 1993 to 2004 model years. It will be reintroduced in 2027.

The SVT Cobra was a high-performance version of the Ford Mustang and was considered the top-of-the-line variant, being positioned above the Mustang GT and Mach 1 models during its production run. On three occasions, the race-ready, street-legal SVT Cobra R variant was produced in limited numbers.

The SVT Cobra was succeeded by the Mustang Shelby GT500 which was introduced for the 2007 model year.

== 1993: Fox-Body small block Cobra ==
Ford Mustang SVT Cobra/Cobra R
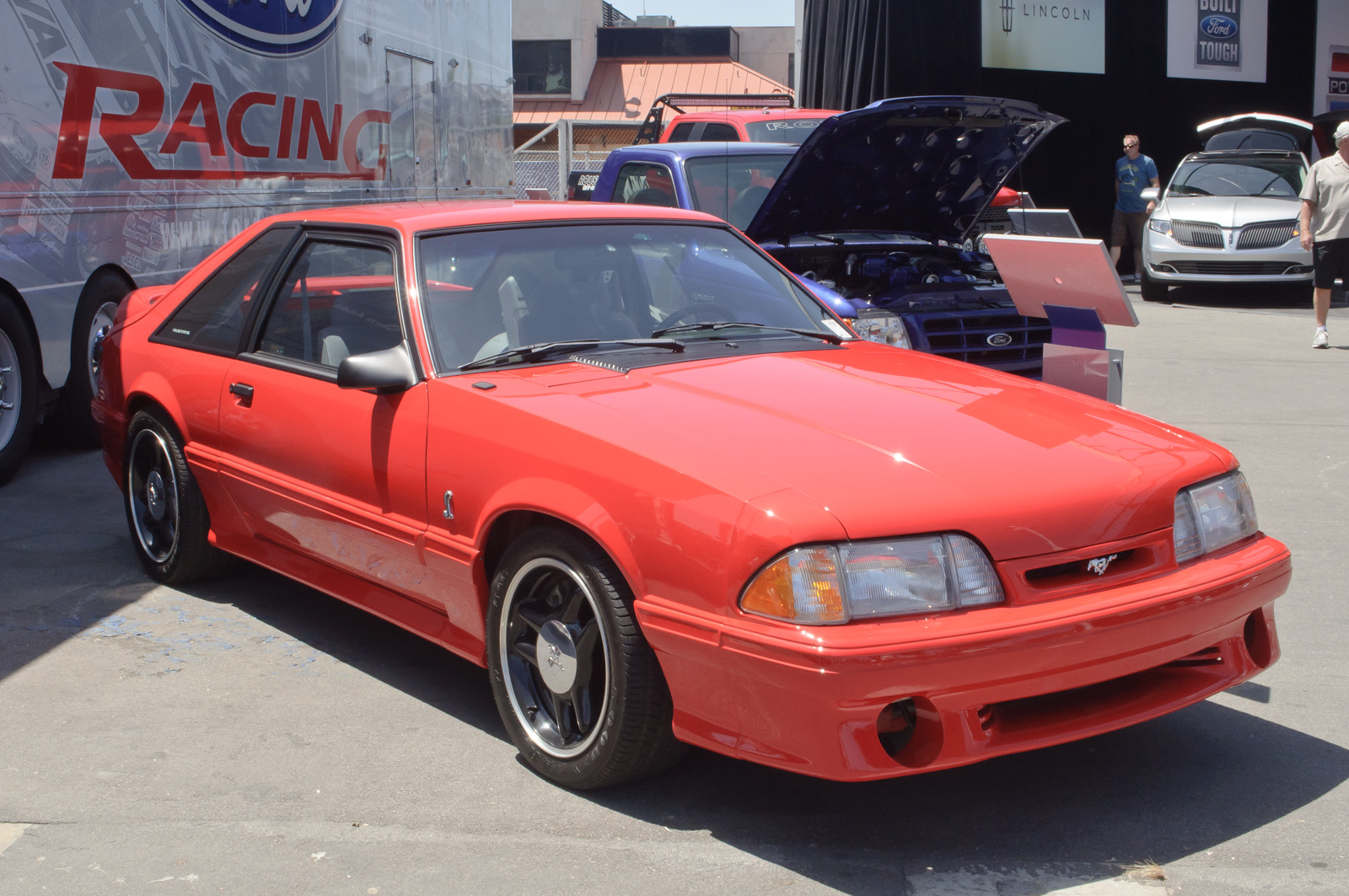
- 1993 Ford Mustang SVT Cobra R

Overview
- Model years: 1993
- Designer: Special Vehicle Engineering (SVE)

Body and chassis
- Body style: 3-door hatchback

Powertrain
- Engine: 302 cu in (4.9 L) small block V8
- Transmission: 5-speed Borg-Warner T-5 manual

Dimensions
- Wheelbase: 100.5 in (2,553 mm)
- Length: 179.6 in (4,562 mm)
- Width: 69.1 in (1,755 mm)
- Height: 52.1 in (1,323 mm)
- Curb weight: 3,255 lb (1,476 kg)

=== 1993 ===
The 1993 Ford Mustang SVT Cobra was launched during the 1992 Chicago Auto Show. It was the premier vehicle of Ford's newly established SVT division, designed to showcase SVT's hallmarks. The exterior of the 1993 SVT Cobra was similar to that year's GT model with differences explained below.

The upgrades featured a 302 cu in (4.9 L) "5.0" V8 engine, rated at a power output of 235 hp (238 PS; 175 kW) at 4,600 rpm and 280 lb⋅ft (380 N⋅m) of torque at 4,000 rpm. According to Road & Track, the Mustang Cobra could complete a 1/4 mile in 14.5 seconds at a trap speed of 98 mph (158 km/h). Acceleration from zero to 60 mph (97 km/h) took 5.9 seconds. The drivetrain received an upgraded transmission, rear disc brakes, and for the first time on a factory Mustang, 17-inch unidirectional wheels.

==== Engine ====
The 1993 SVT Cobra's short block (cylinder block, crankshaft, rods, and pistons) was carried over from the GT model. SVT engineers added the following performance items:

- Cylinder heads — The GT-40 "High Flow" cast iron heads were installed. They were milled for 62.5 cc combustion chambers. The valves measured 1.84 in (46.74 mm) at the intake, and 1.54 in (39.12 mm) at the exhaust. The valves are actuated by Cobra-specific 1.7 ratio roller rockers, constructed of aluminum, and produced for Ford by Crane Cams.
- Intake manifold — The Cobra upper manifold was unique to the 1993 Cobra and had a 2.75 in (69.85 mm) diameter round throttle body opening, diverting air into (8) round staggered ports, each 1.64 in (41.66 mm) in diameter. The lower manifold was identical to the GT-40 manifold used by Ford Racing; it redirects airflow to a rectangular port configuration as needed by the cylinder heads.
- Camshaft — The cam is of the hydraulic roller type (same as the GT). However, the Cobra cam has unique specifications of 0.479 in (12.17 mm) intake/exhaust lift, (209°/209°) duration at 0.050 in (1.27 mm), and a lobe separation of 118.3°
- Air/Fuel Delivery — The increased airflow and fuel consumption of the Cobra required these upgraded components: Larger (compared to the GT) 24 lb/hr fuel injectors, 2.75 in (69.85 mm) MAF meter, 2.56 in (65.02 mm) throttle body, and matching EGR plate handle the increased air-intake of the motor. A specially calibrated X3Z EEC-IV engine control unit runs the system.
- Accessories — The crankshaft pulley diameter decreased by 14% (as compared to the GT) in order to under-drive the alternator (automotive), air-conditioner, and smog pump, all to increase the power output. The water pump pulley was also decreased in diameter by the same amount in order to preserve the ratio of the pump's speed, and thus coolant flow. These smaller accessory pulleys necessitated a shorter serpentine belt.
- Exhaust — To extract the maximum amount of power from the Cobra's powerplant, Ford engineers used tuned mufflers with lower restriction (as compared to the GT). While the factory headers and H-pipe remained the same, the tailpipes were similar to that of a Mustang LX 5.0 L (Sport) model in that they had straight stainless steel tips (instead of turn-down tips on the GT). This is because the Cobra had a revised rear fascia, allowing (unlike the GT) for an exposed dual exhaust.

==== Drivetrain ====
The Borg-Warner World Class T-5 transmission received an internal upgrade compared to the standard World Class T-5. This consisted of custom gearing for the first to third gears (which were reduced by 10% and hardened) while the fourth and fifth (hardened) gear was the same as standard T-5s found in the LX/GTs. The holding capacity of the Cobra's clutch was increased by way of a higher clamping force pressure plate using the same 10-inch diameter as the GT/LX.

==== Suspension ====
- The Cobra shocks and struts were sourced from Tokico and specifically valved for the car by SVT. The springs are linear-rate springs, which were slightly softer than the GT's progressive rate springs. The Cobra also features a smaller front anti-roll bar, as well as stiffer bushings in the rear upper control arms.

==== Exterior Styling ====
The Cobra featured a more subdued styling than the GT.

==== Paint and Interior Trim ====
The 1993 Cobra was available in four exterior paint choices, as shown in the table below. Interior color choices were opal gray cloth, black cloth, and opal gray leather.

Paint Code	Paint Color
ES	Vibrant Red Clearcoat
EY	Vibrant Red*
RD	Teal Metallic*
UA	Black*

==== 1993 SVT Cobra base prices ====
Model	VIN Code	MSRP
Cobra hatchback	P42D	$18,505
Cobra R hatchback	P42D	$25,692

=== Cobra R ===
The 1993 Cobra R was the first of three special Cobra R models produced. The "R" designation stood for "Race" and as per the name, the cars did not have a radio, speakers, wiring and antenna, air conditioner, foglights, sound deadener, rear seat, rear safety belts, rear carpeting, and roll-up cargo cover, among other items. The car had power steering, but no other power assist options. It has roll-up windows, manual door locks, and manually-adjustable mirrors. The manually-adjustable Opal Gray cloth bucket seats from the Mustang LX were lighter than the GT/Cobra sport seats, and a piece of thin gray carpeting secured by Velcro covered the bare hatch and rear seat area. The deletions reduced weight by 450 pounds, but this was somewhat offset by the necessary addition of heavy-duty hardware needed for competition.

To stiffen the chassis, a strut tower brace was installed to tie the cowl together, and a pair of V-braces (used on all 1983–1993 Mustang convertibles) attached in an X-pattern tied the subframes together. The Cobra R featured Eibach springs that were too stiff for the street, but designed for a racetrack. The Cobra R also had adjustable Koni shocks and struts.

The car also featured 13-inch Kelsey-Hayes vented rotors in front and 10.5-inch vented rotors in the back. According to Neil W. Ressler, the executive director of vehicle engineering for Ford Motor Company at the time and one of the founding fathers of SVT, the 1993 Cobra R's brakes "were the most expensive brakes ever fitted to a [production] Mustang. I bought the brakes for the R model out of my engineering budget. I wanted big brakes, and we didn't have them. The program couldn't afford it. Unbeknownst to the higher-ups at Ford, I spent like $2,100 per car to buy those big brakes. But the last thing I wanted was a fast car that didn't stop. We ended up putting good brakes on all those [Cobra R] vehicles."

The same 5.0 L V8 from the Cobra was used in the Cobra R. However, the radiator was sourced from what was, by this time, two discontinued Fox-Platform mates: the Seventh-Generation Lincoln Continental and the Lincoln Continental Mark VII powered by the BMW M21 Turbo Diesel Engine, with a purge tank having been added to this Radiator for improved cooling. A power steering cooler (located behind the left foglight bezel) and an engine oil cooler were standard.

The Cobra R wheels were actually the optional 17x8-inch five-lug wheels from the soon-to-be-released 1994 Mustang GT, but were painted gloss black and featured chrome lug covers. The standard tires were Goodyear Gatorbacks. To give the car better front-end geometry, lower control arms from the 1994 Mustang were fitted.

Contrary to SVT's stated wishes, many Cobra R models were purchased by private collectors and never actually driven, but several competed successfully in the International Motor Sports Association (IMSA) Firestone Grand Sport Series and Sports Car Club of America (SCCA) World Challenge Class B Series. Of the three Cobra R models produced, the 1993 model had the benefit of being the lightest and the smallest.

A total of 107 Cobra R models were produced, and all were painted in Vibrant Red Clearcoat. According to Ford's announcement on April 7, 1993, the Cobra R was produced to take the Fox-bodied Mustang out in grand style, a "best of the last" model. According to SVT, the Cobra R can accelerate from zero to 60 mph (97 km/h) in 5.7 seconds and achieve a top speed of 140 mph (225 km/h).

=== 1993 Detailed Production Numbers ===
==== Cobra Hatchback ====
Interior	Black	Vibrant Red	Vibrant Red Clearcoat	Teal Metallic	Totals
Opal Gray cloth	327	1	414	368	1,110
Black cloth	448	1	361	185	995
Opal Gray leather	1,079	7	1,000	802	2,888
TOTALS	1,854	9	1,775	1,355	4,993

==== Cobra R Hatchback ====
Interior	Black	Vibrant Red	Vibrant Red Clearcoat	Teal Metallic	Totals
Opal Gray cloth	0	0	107	0	107
TOTALS	0	0	107	0	107

==== Total 1993 Production ====
Year	Model	Production
1993	Cobra Hatchback	4,993
1993	Cobra R Hatchback	107
1993	TOTAL	5,100

== 1994–1995: SN-95 small block Cobra ==
SVT Mustang Cobra/Cobra R (SN-95)
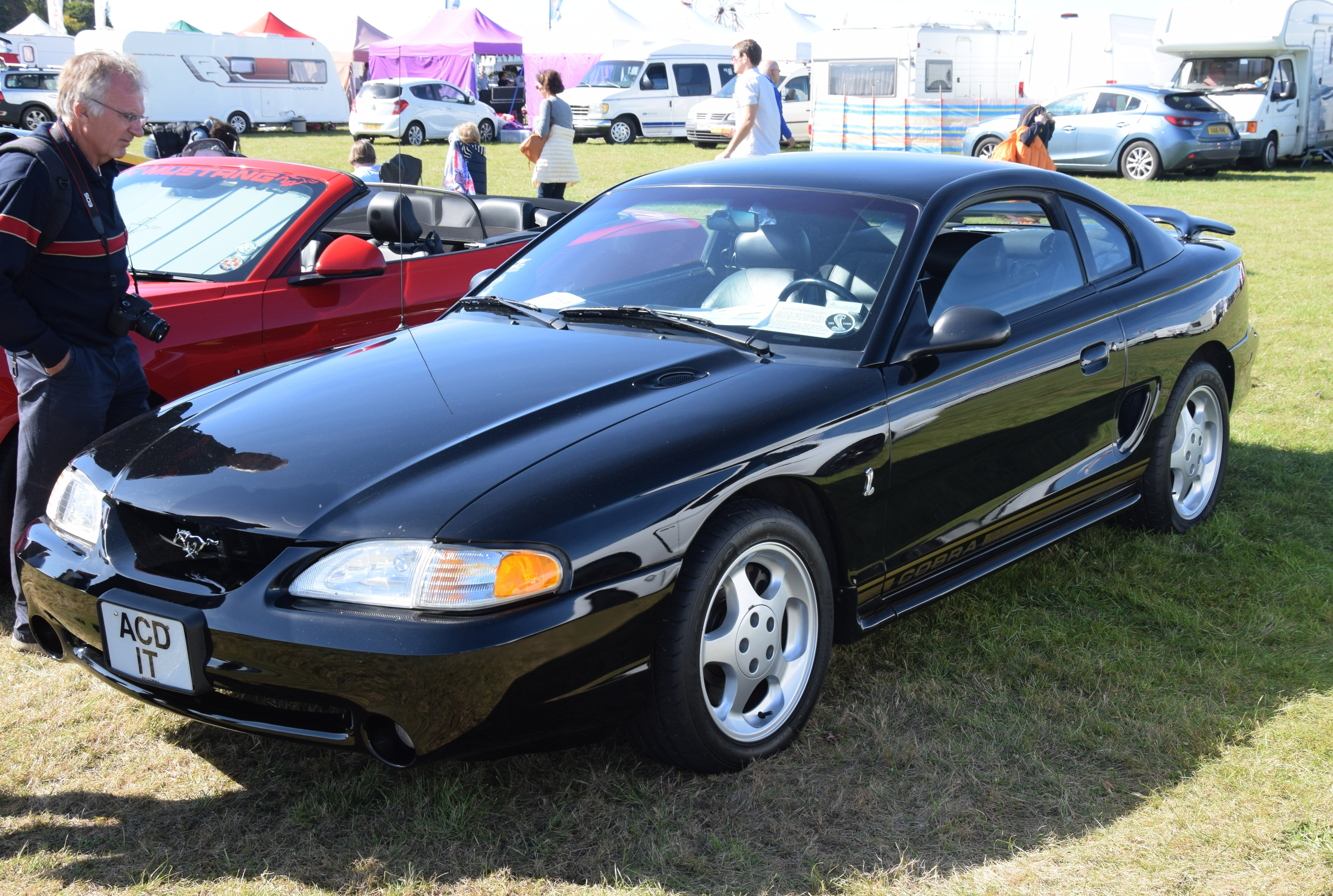
- 1995 Ford Mustang Cobra

Overview
- Manufacturer: SVT
- Model years: 1994–1995 (11,267 produced)
- Designer: Special Vehicle Engineering (SVE)

Body and chassis
- Body style: 2-door coupe; 2-door convertible

Powertrain
- Engine: 302 cu in (4.9 L) small block "5.0" V8
- Transmission: 5-speed Borg-Warner T-5 manual

Dimensions
- Wheelbase: 101.3 in (2,573 mm)
- Length: 181.5 in (4,610 mm)
- Width: 71.8 in (1,824 mm)
- Height: Coupe: 53.4 in (1,356 mm); Convertible: 53.3 in (1,354 mm)
- Curb weight: Coupe: 3,354 lb (1,521 kg); Convertible: 3,524 lb (1,598 kg)

=== 1994 ===
Ford introduced the newly redesigned Mustang (code-named SN-95) in December 1993. It was the first major redesign since the third-generation Fox-bodied Mustang that was introduced for the 1979 model year. Known as Fox-4 (because it was based on the Fox platform as a 1994 model), the new 1994 Mustang was an improvement over the outgoing 1993 model. The new car's ride, handling, styling, ergonomics, and standard and optional equipment were improved from the previous model. However, the Chevrolet Camaro Z/28 and Pontiac Firebird Formula and Trans Am, that were redesigned for 1993, came standard with 275 hp (205 kW), while the 1994 Mustang GT engine produced 215 hp (160 kW).

The 1994 Cobra was introduced midway through the model year with the same engine as the 1993 Cobra. With its GT-40 cast-iron heads and lower intake and its Cobra-specific upper intake, power increased to 240 hp (179 kW; 243 PS). However, the actual output of the Cobra's GT-40 enhanced engine was probably higher. Ford claimed 6.3 seconds to achieve 60 mph and a top speed of 140 mph (225 km/h). Muscle Mustangs & Fast Fords magazine tested a 1994 Cobra coupe and achieved a 0-60 mph acceleration time of 5.7 seconds and the quarter mile in 13.87 seconds at 99.49 mph (160.11 km/h).

Initially, the 1994 SVT Cobra was only available as a coupe, but the first factory-produced SVT Cobra convertible was the 1994 Indy 500 Pace Car Replica. On the same day that the new 1994 Cobra coupe was launched, SVT announced that it would be building a Cobra convertible (the first factory-produced "Cobra" convertible since the 1970 Shelby models) and that this convertible had been selected to pace the 1994 Indianapolis 500. The new Cobra convertible, or Indy 500 Pace Car Replica, was made available later in the 1994 model year.

The 1994 Cobra offered refinements compared to lower trim level Mustang models. According to Jim Campisano's book Powered by SVT: Celebrating a Decade of Ford Performance, below is a list of items that set the 1994 SVT Cobra apart from the 1994 Mustang GT:

Body and appearance components

- Unique front fascia with round foglights (versus rectangular on GT).
- Unique complex-reflector headlights.
- Chrome Cobra badges on front fenders (versus GT emblems).
- Unique rear spoiler with integrated LED stop lamp (versus the non-LED stop lamp integrated into the decklid on GT).
- 160-mph speedometer, white-faced instrument gauges, and black lettering (versus 150-mph speedometer, black-faced gauges, and white lettering in GT).
- Leather-wrapped shift knob, boot, and parking brake.
- Magnesium front seat cushion frames.
- Unique Cobra floor mats.

Engine and chassis

- GT-40-style 5.0 L Cobra V8 engine (versus High Output 5.0 L V8 on GT).
- 13-inch vented front disc brakes, 11.65-inch rear discs with dual-piston calipers, and standard ABS (versus 10.8" vented front discs, 10.5-inch rear discs with single-piston calipers, and optional ABS on GT).
- Unique 17x8-inch cast-aluminum wheels.
- Standard Goodyear GS-C P255/45ZR17 tires (versus Goodyear Eagle P225/55ZR16 standard on GT, P245/45ZR17 optional on GT).
- Unique chassis tuning.

==== Paint and interior trim ====
The 1994 Cobra was available in three exterior paint colors, as shown in the table below. Interior color choices were black cloth, saddle cloth, black leather, and saddle leather. On the 1994 Cobra convertible, the vinyl top was only available in saddle, and was the same one used on regular Mustang convertibles.

==== 1994 SVT Cobra base prices ====
All prices below are in United States dollars when the vehicles were sold new at a Ford dealership before any available options were added.

Model	VIN Code	MSRP
Cobra coupe	P42D	$20,765
Indy 500 Pace Car Replica	P45D	$26,845

=== 1994 Indy 500 Pace Car Replica ===
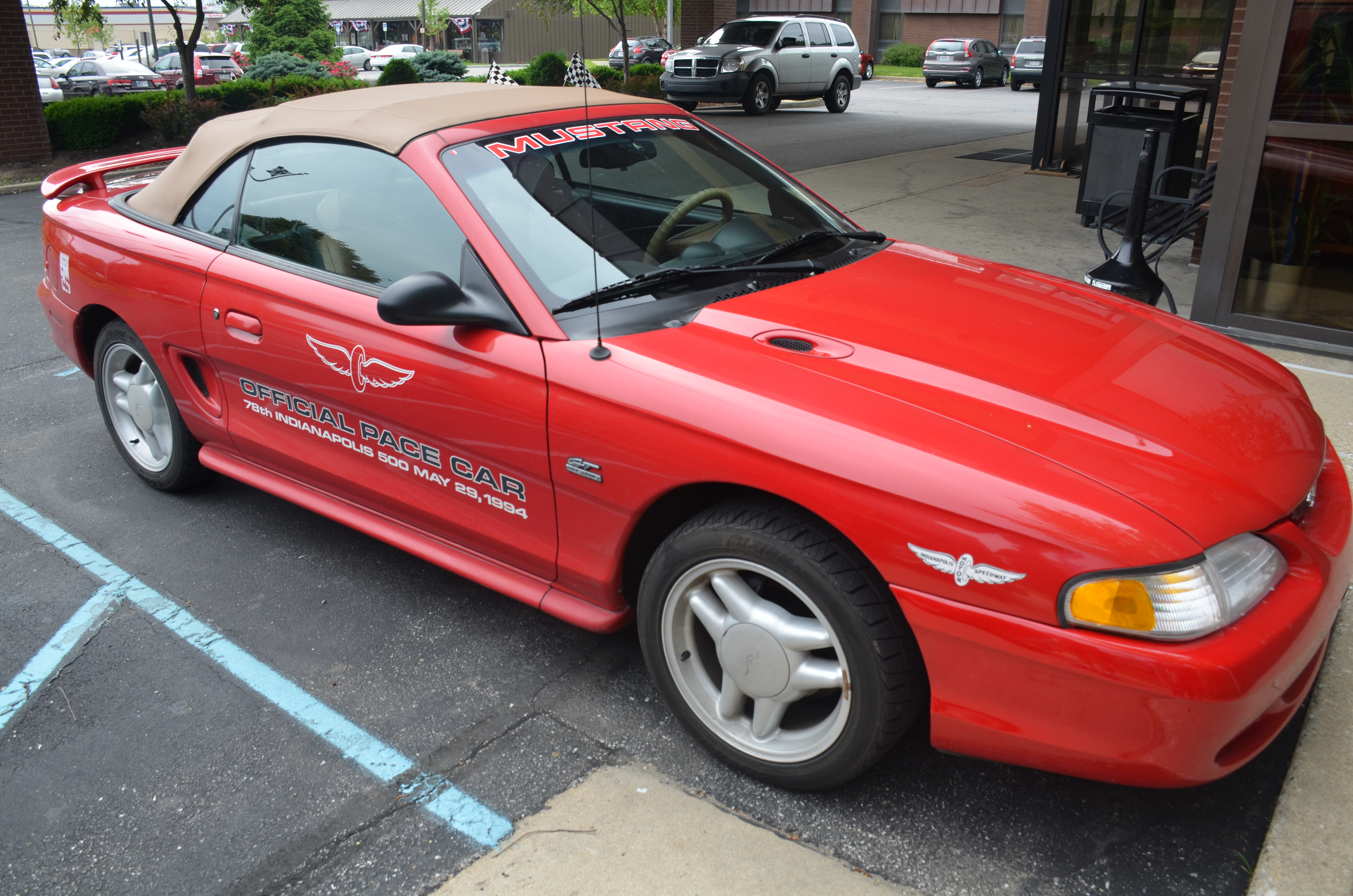
1994 Ford Mustang Indy 500 Festival Car. A GT convertible that looked similar to the actual Cobra replica. A total of 107 of these were produced.

To celebrate Ford Mustang's 30th anniversary in 1994, a trio of SVT Cobra convertibles served as pace cars for the 78th Indianapolis 500 race on May 29, 1994. The three cars were modified by Jack Roush in Allen Park, Michigan. The pace cars were installed with heavy-duty four-speed automatic transmissions, 15-gallon racing fuel cells, heavier rear springs (to accommodate the weight of television camera equipment), a Halon fire-extinguisher system, a rollbar with 50,000-watt strobe lights built in, and special lights in the rear spoiler. Parnelli Jones, a seven-time Indy 500 competitor who won the 1963 race, drove the pace car at the event.

A total of 1,000 Indy 500 Pace Car Replicas were produced. All were painted in Rio Red and fitted with Saddle leather interiors and matching Saddle vinyl tops. The Indy 500 winged-tire logo was featured as a chrome cloisonné badge on the decklid and embroidered on the front seatbacks. A set of "Official Pace Car" decals were shipped inside the trunk and up to the buyer's discretion to install them. The decals on the three official pace cars had the tire logo in white, while it was grey on the replica decals.

The 1994 SVT Mustang Cobra was the third Ford Mustang selected for official pace car duties at the Indianapolis 500 race. The other two were 1965 Mustang in 1964 and Fox-body Mustang in 1979.

=== 1994 detailed production numbers ===
==== Cobra Coupe ====
Interior	Crystal White	Black	Rio Red	Totals
Black cloth	268	331	333	932
Saddle cloth	123	130	208	461
Black leather	473	776	625	1,874
Saddle leather	442	558	742	1,742
TOTALS	1,306	1,795	1,908	5,009

==== Cobra Convertible ====
Interior / Roof	Crystal White	Black	Rio Red	Totals
Saddle leather / Saddle	0	0	1,000	1,000
TOTALS	0	0	1,000	1,000

==== Total 1994 production ====
Year	Model	Production
1994	Cobra Coupe	5,009
1994	Cobra Convertible	1,000
1994	TOTAL	6,009

=== 1995 ===
The 1995 Cobra was essentially a carryover of the 1994 model. The chrome SVT badge on the decklid was new for all SVT vehicles this year. A new vertical spat was added to the leading edge of each rocker panel extension to prevent rock damage to the lower body.

The Cobra convertible returned for a limited production run of 1,003 units, and all were painted Black and fitted with Saddle leather interiors and Black convertible tops. Newly available for the 1995 Cobra convertible was a removable hardtop option. This was a one-year-only option due to its $1,825 price and 90 pounds of additional weight; thus, only 499 of the Cobra convertibles came with this option. Removing or installing the hardtop was a two-person job, and this hardtop could not easily fit any other Mustang or Cobra convertible from this vintage due to the latching mechanisms of the fiberglass top and the dome light wiring. Included with this option, was a carrier that rolled on four casters allowing for storage of the hardtop when it was not being used. This hardtop option was originally supposed to be an available option for the all-new 1994 Mustang convertible, but it was delayed due to supply problems and quality control concerns. This hardtop option was not available on the 1995 Mustang GT convertible.

The biggest news for 1995 was the return of the SVT Cobra R.

==== Paint and Interior Trim ====
The 1995 Cobra was available in the same three exterior paint colors from 1994, shown in the table below. Interior color choices were the same as in 1994: black cloth, saddle cloth, black leather, and saddle leather. On the 1995 Cobra convertible, the vinyl top was only available in black, and was the same one used on regular Mustang convertibles.

==== 1995 SVT Cobra base prices ====
All prices below are in United States dollars when the vehicles were sold new at a Ford dealership before any available options were added.

Model	VIN Code	MSRP
Cobra coupe	P42D	$21,300
Cobra R coupe	P42C	$37,599
Cobra convertible	P45D	$25,605

=== Cobra R (1995) ===
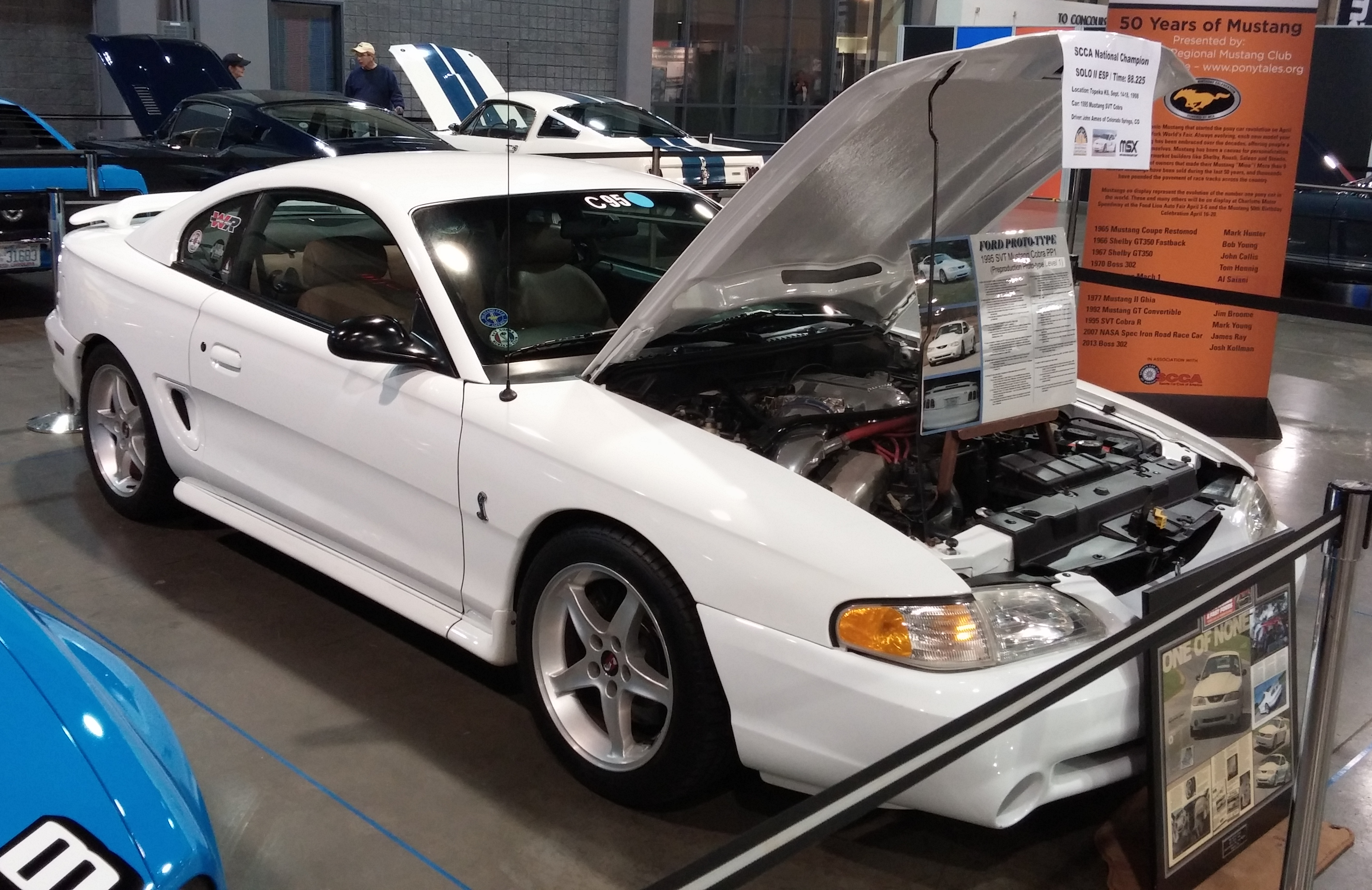
1995 Ford Mustang Cobra R

In the wake of the 1993 R's success, SVT engineers developed a more powerful R-model based on the 1995 Cobra. The Cobra's 5.0 L V8 was replaced with an SVT modified version of Ford's 5.8 L Windsor V8, re-engineered to have a power output of 300 hp (224 kW; 304 PS). A new 22-gallon fuel cell was installed. A Tremec 3550 5-speed manual transmission was standard. Weight savings were achieved by the deletion of the back seat, radio, power windows/seats, and air-conditioning. The fog lights were omitted to provide ducts for the front disk brakes. Additional changes included heavy-duty progressive-rate springs, thicker stabilizer bars, and a front strut tower brace. The 1995 R was available only in white with a saddle cloth interior, each with a unique center-tiered fiberglass hood designed to clear the engine and induction system. A total of 250 were built, with Ford keeping 18 examples for its press and engineering fleets.

Unlike the 1993 Cobra R, purchasers of the new Cobra R were required to hold a valid competition license or own a race team. This was done after many 1993 R models had ended up in private hands as collector vehicles; however, several 1995 Rs were purchased by collector car owners.

=== 1995 Detailed Production Numbers ===
==== Cobra Coupe ====
Interior	Crystal White	Black	Rio Red	Totals
Black cloth	127	137	110	374
Saddle cloth	66	55	85	206
Black leather	498	760	535	1,793
Saddle leather	434	481	717	1,632
TOTALS	1,125	1,433	1,447	4,005

==== Cobra R Coupe ====
Interior	Crystal White	Black	Rio Red	Totals
Saddle cloth	250	0	0	250
TOTALS	250	0	0	250

==== Cobra Convertible ====
Interior / Roof	Crystal White	Black	Rio Red	Totals
Saddle leather / Black	0	1,003	0	1,003
TOTALS	0	1,003	0	1,003

==== Total 1994–1995 production ====
Year	Model	Production
1994	Cobra Coupe	5,009
1994	Cobra Convertible	1,000
1994	Total	6,009
1995	Cobra Coupe	4,005
1995	Cobra R Coupe	250
1995	Cobra Convertible	1,003
1995	Total	5,258
TOTAL		11,267

== 1996–1998: SN-95 Modular Cobra ==
SN-95 Modular SVT Mustang Cobra
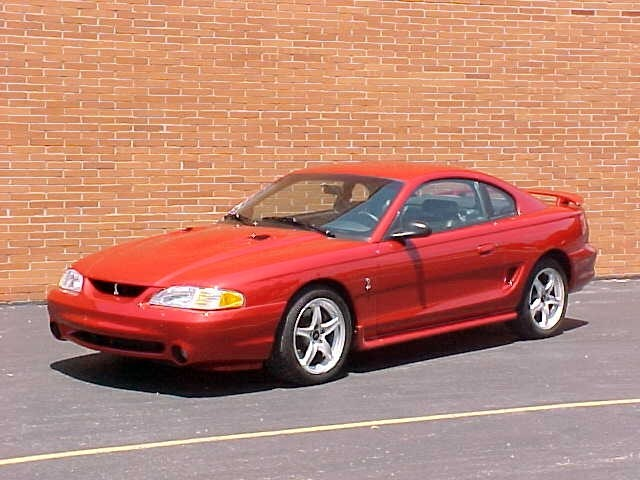
- 1998 Ford Mustang Cobra

Overview
- Model years: 1996–1998 (28,705 produced)
- Designer: Team Mustang

Body and chassis
- Body style: 2-door coupe; 2-door convertible

Powertrain
- Engine: 4.6 L DOHC Modular V8
- Transmission: 5-speed T-45 manual

Dimensions
- Wheelbase: 101.3 in (2,573 mm)
- Length: 182.5 in (4,636 mm)
- Width: 71.8 in (1,824 mm)
- Height: ¢=: Coupe: 53.2 in (1,351 mm); Convertible: 53.3 in (1,354 mm)
- Curb weight: Coupe: 3,391 lb (1,538 kg); Convertible: 3,531 lb (1,602 kg)

=== 1996 ===
For the 1996 model year, Ford retired the aging 302 cu in (4.9 L) "5.0" V8 in the Mustang GT and SVT Cobra, with a new aluminum 4.6 L DOHC modular unit that was smoother and had slightly better fuel economy. Starting with the 1996 model year, every Cobra engine was hand-assembled by two-person teams at the Ford Romeo Engine Plant in Romeo, Michigan, a practice that continued through the remainder of SVT Cobra production. Each engine had a label (later, a metal plaque on the 2003–2004 Cobra engines) bearing the names and signatures of the two engine builders. The Romeo engine, as it was called, produced 305 hp (227 kW) and 300 lb⋅ft (410 N⋅m) of torque, enabling the new Cobra to go 0-60 mph in 5.9 seconds and do the quarter mile in 13.99 seconds at 101.6 mph. However, Car and Driver magazine was able to hit 60 mph in 5.4 seconds and the quarter mile in 14.00 seconds at 102 mph during a comparison test in their December 1995 issue. The 1996 Cobra engine redlined at 6,800 rpm, with fuel shut-off occurring at 7,000 rpm.

Ford's modular V8 debuted in the 1991 Lincoln Town Car as a single-overhead-cam (SOHC) setup, and then the engine really displayed its power potential with 32 valves, dual overhead cams (DOHC), and 285 hp (213 kW) in the all-new 1993 Lincoln Mark VIII.

The modular engine's aluminum block was cast in Italy by Teksid, a firm that produces parts for Ferrari and Formula One racers. SVT fitted the 1996 Cobra with the Borg Warner T-45 5-speed manual transmission, which was also used in the Mustang GT. (Tremec bought the production rights for the T-45 in late 1998, although the unit remained unchanged in terms of strength.)

==== Paint and interior trim ====
The 1996 Cobra was available in four exterior paint colors, as shown in the table below. Interior color choices were the same as before: black cloth, saddle cloth, black leather, and saddle leather. On Cobra convertibles, the vinyl top was available in black, saddle, or white, and was the same one used on regular Mustang convertibles.

==== 1996 SVT Cobra base prices ====
All prices below are in United States dollars when the vehicles were sold new at a Ford dealership before any available options were added.

Model	VIN Code	MSRP
Cobra coupe	P47V	$24,810
Cobra convertible	P46V	$27,580

=== 1996 Mystic Cobra ===
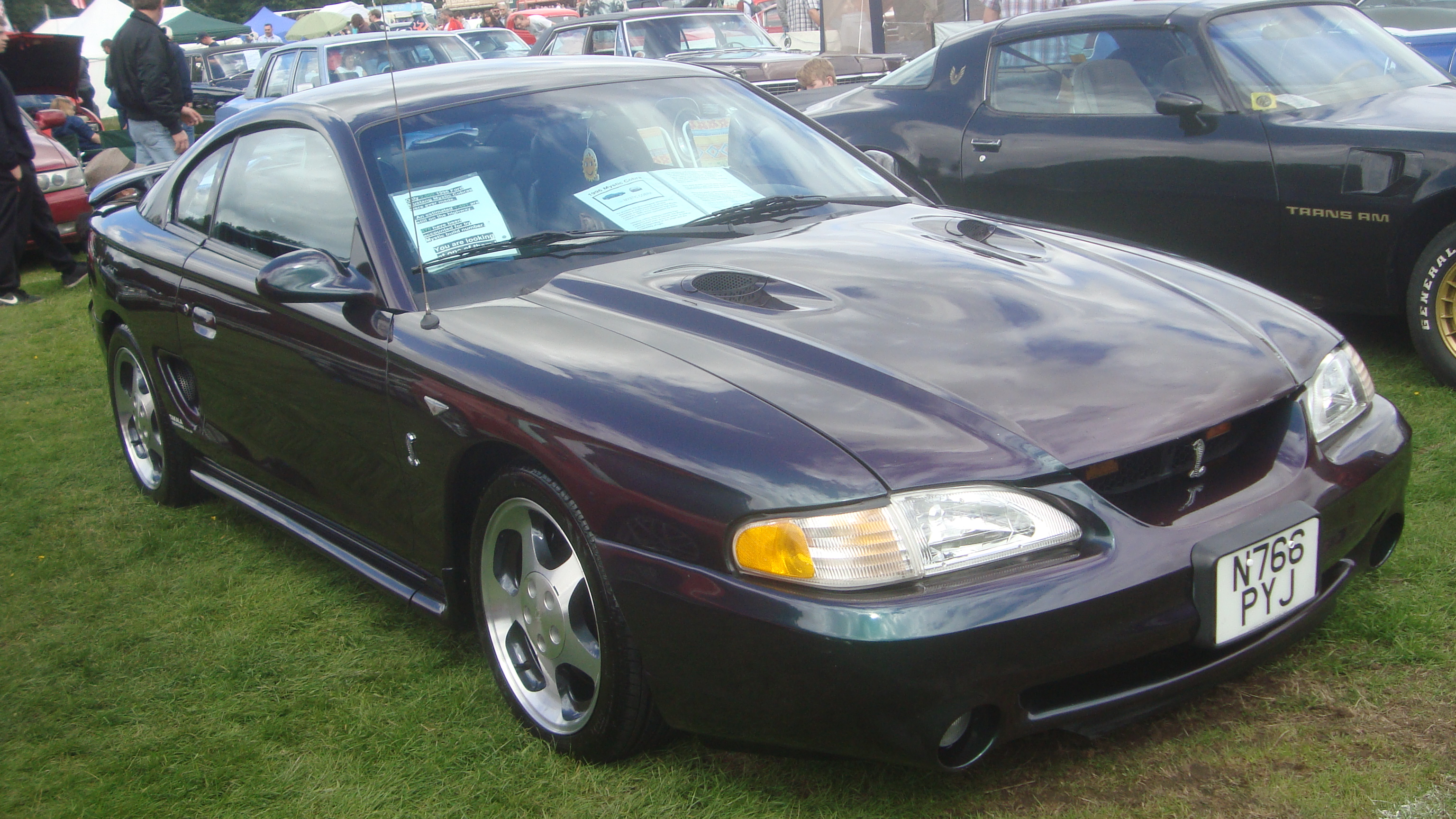
1996 Ford Mustang Mystic Cobra

To promote the technological advances and mechanical achievements of its new modular engine, Ford introduced the Mystic Cobra for the 1996 model year, featuring a color-shifting paint formulated by BASF. Utilizing color-shifting ChromaFlair pigments from Flex Products, the Mystic paint shifted from green to amber to gold to purple depending on the angle and the availability of light. The research and development process for this paint took three years to complete. Only available on the Cobra coupe, the Mystic paint option cost $815 at the time, and the 1996 Mystic Cobra was the first production vehicle to wear a color-shifting factory paint job. A total of 1,999 Mystic Cobras were produced, and of these, 1,990 had black leather interiors and nine had black cloth interiors. Since the paint continues to have special proprietary uses, any remaining quantities are tightly controlled and thus require a VIN verification through a complying Ford body shop to obtain the special paint to repaint any damaged areas.

=== 1996 detailed production numbers ===
==== Cobra Coupe ====
Interior	Crystal White	Black	Laser Red	Mystic	Totals
Black cloth	10	13	16	9	48
Saddle cloth	4	10	4	0	18
Black leather	739	1,376	926	1,990	5,031
Saddle leather	676	725	994	0	2,395
TOTALS	1,429	2,124	1,940	1,999	7,496

==== Cobra Convertible ====
Interior / Roof	Crystal White	Black	Laser Red	Mystic	Totals
Black cloth / Black	0	2	2	0	4
Black cloth / White	2	0	1	0	3
Saddle cloth / Saddle	1	1	1	0	3
Black leather / Black	144	664	362	0	1,170
Black leather / Saddle	0	5	0	0	5
Black leather / White	59	2	13	0	74
Saddle leather / Black	11	158	36	0	205
Saddle leather / Saddle	220	222	536	0	978
Saddle leather / White	57	0	11	0	68
TOTALS	494	1,054	962	0	2,510

==== Total 1996 production ====
Year	Model	Production
1996	Cobra Coupe	7,493
1996	Cobra Convertible	2,510
1996	TOTAL	10,003

=== 1997 ===
The 1997 Cobra was basically a carryover of the 1996 model. The previous honeycomb grille was deleted to allow more airflow into the larger radiator that was standard on the entire Mustang lineup, and the 1997 Cobra had a larger diameter fan. Also new was a parallel-flow air conditioning condenser that was exclusive to the SVT Cobra. The rear spoiler was now optional, as it had been standard on all previous models.

==== Paint and interior trim ====
The only other major change for 1997 was in the color palette. The 1997 Cobra was available in four exterior colors. The interior choices were the same as what was offered in 1996: black cloth, saddle cloth, black leather, and saddle leather. On Cobra convertibles, the vinyl top was again available in black, saddle, or white, and was the same one used on regular Mustang convertibles.

==== 1997 SVT Cobra base prices ====
All prices below are in United States dollars when the vehicles were sold new at a Ford dealership before any available options were added.

Model	VIN Code	MSRP
Cobra coupe	P47V	$25,335
Cobra convertible	P46V	$28,135

=== 1997 detailed production numbers ===
==== Cobra Coupe ====
Interior	Crystal White	Black	Rio Red	Pacific Green	Totals
Black cloth	20	43	39	0	102
Saddle cloth	47	7	13	27	94
Black leather	817	1,641	1,131	0	3,589
Saddle leather	659	678	811	1,028	3,176
TOTALS	1,543	2,369	1,994	1,055	6,961

==== Cobra Convertible ====
Interior / Roof	Crystal White	Black	Rio Red	Pacific Green	Totals
Black cloth / Black	2	14	6	0	22
Saddle cloth / Black	1	2	0	0	3
Saddle cloth / Saddle	4	0	7	4	15
Saddle cloth / White	3	0	0	0	3
Black leather / Black	190	840	416	0	1,446
Black leather / Saddle	7	12	0	0	19
Black leather / White	76	1	13	0	90
Saddle leather / Black	4	92	15	0	111
Saddle leather / Saddle	258	219	466	365	1,308
Saddle leather / White	61	0	2	8	71
TOTALS	606	1,180	925	377	3,088

==== Total 1997 production ====
Year	Model	Production
1997	Cobra Coupe	6,961
1997	Cobra Convertible	3,088
1997	TOTAL	10,049

=== 1998 ===
The 1998 Cobra remained mostly unchanged from previous model years. The wheels were similar to the cast-aluminum units used on the 1995 Cobra R, but the wheel cutouts were painted gray, and the wheels were 17x8-inch, instead of 17x9-inch versions on the 1995 Cobra R. Tires were the same BF Goodrich Comp T/A versions as before. Other minor changes included a redesigned console in which the dashboard-mounted digital clock pod was deleted, and the clock function was then integrated into the radio's digital display. Also, the standard premium sound system now included a single-disc CD player.

This was also the last year of the return-style fuel system, as it was replaced with a newer returnless system for 1999.

==== Paint and interior trim ====
The 1998 Cobra was available in five exterior colors,. Chrome Yellow was added midyear on the 1998 Cobra. The interior choices were the same as before: black cloth, saddle cloth, black leather, and saddle leather. However, the leather pattern changed. On Cobra convertibles, the vinyl top was again available in black, saddle, or white, and was the same one used on regular Mustang convertibles.

==== 1998 SVT Cobra base prices ====
All prices below are in United States dollars when the vehicles were sold new at a Ford dealership before any available options were added.

Model	VIN Code	MSRP
Cobra coupe	P47V	$25,710
Cobra convertible	P46V	$28,510

=== 1998 detailed production numbers ===
==== Cobra Coupe ====
Interior	Crystal White	Black	Laser Red	Chrome Yellow	Bright Atlantic Blue	Totals
Black cloth	8	6	5	5	10	34
Saddle cloth	10	2	5	0	0	17
Black leather	506	1,334	675	704	553	3,782
Saddle leather	434	356	551	0	0	1,341
TOTALS	958	1,708	1,236	709	563	5,174

==== Cobra Convertible ====
Interior / Roof	Crystal White	Black	Laser Red	Chrome Yellow	Bright Atlantic Blue	Totals
Black cloth / Black	0	0	1	5	1	7
Black cloth / White	0	1	0	0	1	2
Saddle cloth / Saddle	0	0	2	0	0	2
Saddle cloth / White	1	0	0	0	0	1
Black leather / Black	218	967	340	542	224	2,291
Black leather / Saddle	0	11	0	0	0	11
Black leather / White	46	1	3	8	23	81
Saddle leather / Black	6	61	12	0	0	79
Saddle leather / Saddle	267	215	484	0	0	966
Saddle leather / White	40	0	0	0	0	40
TOTALS	578	1,256	842	555	249	3,480

==== Total 1996–1998 production ====
Year	Model	Production
1996	Cobra Coupe	7,492
1996	Cobra Convertible	2,510
1996	Total	10,002
1997	Cobra Coupe	6,961
1997	Cobra Convertible	3,088
1997	Total	10,049
1998	Cobra Coupe	5,174
1998	Cobra Convertible	3,480
1998	Total	8,654
TOTAL		28,705

== 1999–2001: New Edge Modular Cobra ==
New Edge Modular; SVT Mustang Cobra
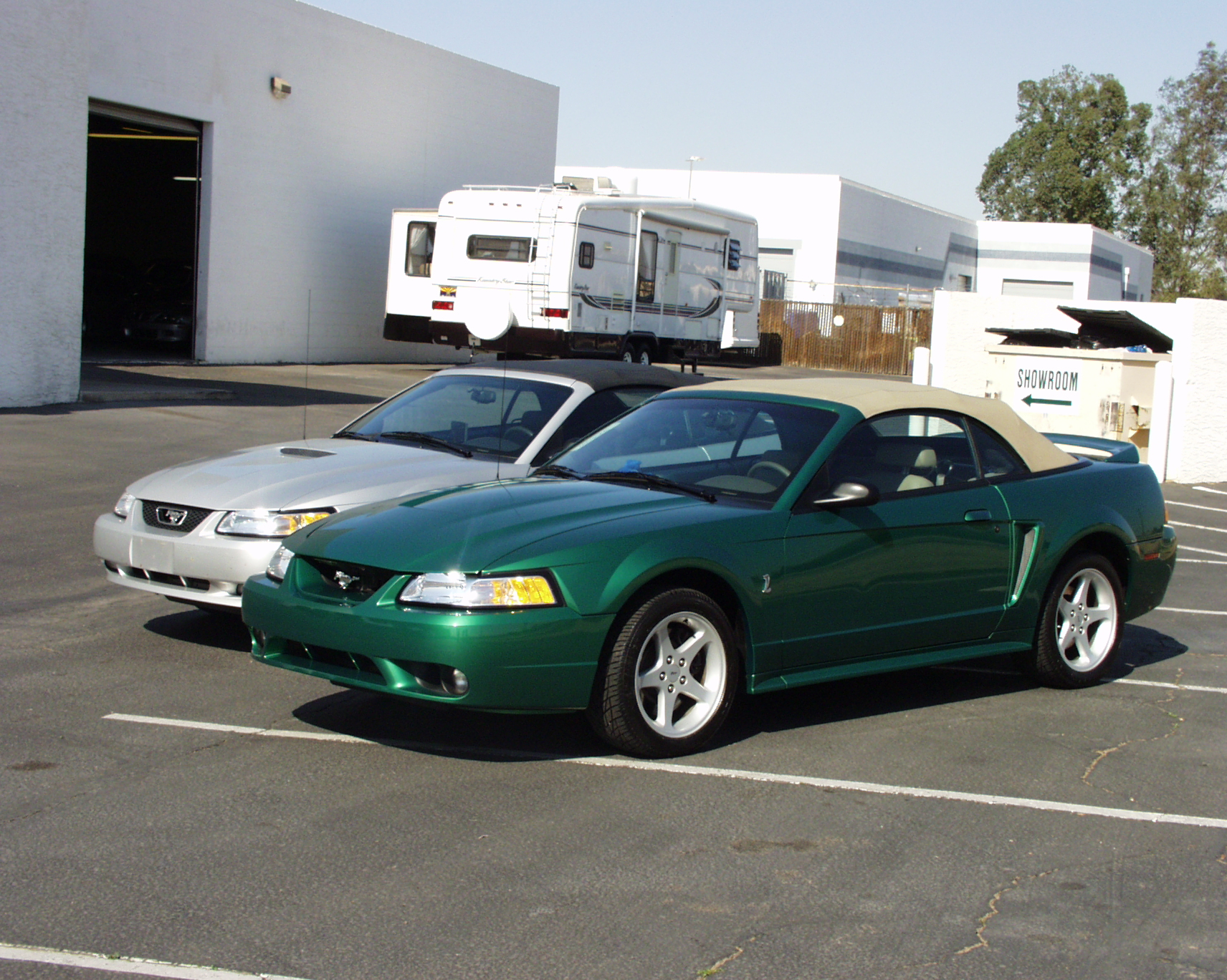
- 1999 Ford Mustang Cobra convertible alongside a 1999 Ford Mustang GT

Overview
- Model years: 1999, 2001–2002 (15,346 produced)
- Designer: Team Mustang

Body and chassis
- Body style: 2-door coupe; 2-door convertible

Powertrain
- Engine: 4.6 L DOHC Modular V8
- Transmission: 5-speed T-45 manual (1999); 5-speed TR-3650 manual (2001)

Dimensions
- Wheelbase: 101.3 in (2,573 mm)
- Length: 183.5 in (4,661 mm)
- Width: 73.1 in (1,857 mm)
- Height: Coupe: 53.2 in (1,351 mm); Convertible: 53.5 in (1,359 mm)
- Curb weight: Coupe: 3,430 lb (1,556 kg); Convertible: 3,560 lb (1,615 kg)

=== 1999 ===
For the 1999 model year, Ford restyled the fourth-generation Mustang utilizing Ford's New Edge design language. The facelifted car featured redesigned body panels that followed Ford's new worldwide styling direction. The interior was basically a carryover from the 1994–1998 Mustangs, and most of the parts were interchangeable. All 1999–2004 SVT Cobras featured independent rear suspension, the first to be fitted to a production Mustang model and unique to the Cobra. A new returnless fuel system was used to meet emission standards.

The new 1999 Cobra had an upgraded 4.6 L DOHC V8 engine rated at 320 hp (324 PS; 239 kW) and 317 lb⋅ft (430 N⋅m) of torque. However, when the new 1999 Cobras were put through their paces by their new owners, it was revealed that 0-60 mph times were slower than a comparably-equipped 1998 model, and dyno tests suggested that the advertised power output was closer to 285 hp (289 PS; 213 kW), even though Ford claimed that the engine was outputting 15 hp more than the 1998 Cobra engine. Due to this outcry, on August 6, 1999, Ford halted the sales of all unsold 1999 Cobras on dealership lots and recalled all 1999 Cobras that had been sold. In the meantime, Ford then replaced the intake manifold, certain computer components, and the exhaust system from the catalytic converters to the tailpipes to achieve a "true" 320 hp at the crankshaft, which came to pass when the Cobra returned two years after the 1999 performance debacle in 2001 with said changes.

==== Paint and interior trim ====
The 1999 Cobra was available in four exterior paint colors, as shown in the table below. Interior color choices were limited to two offerings: dark charcoal and medium parchment. The standard leather seats were the same optional leather units used in the 1999 Mustang GT, but without the embroidered running pony logo on the front seatbacks. Cloth seats were no longer offered on the Cobra, as they were never popular with buyers in previous model years. On Cobra convertibles, the vinyl top was available in black, parchment, or white, and was the same as used on regular 1999 Mustang convertibles.

==== 1999 SVT Cobra base prices ====
All prices below are in United States dollars when the vehicles were sold new at a Ford dealership before any available options were added.

Model	VIN Code	MSRP
Cobra coupe	P47V	$27,470
Cobra convertible	P46V	$31,470

=== 1999 detailed production numbers ===
==== Cobra Coupe ====
Interior	Ultra White	Ebony	Rio Red	Electric Green	Totals
Dark Charcoal	472	1,204	734	185	2,595
Medium Parchment	322	412	478	223	1,435
Other	0	3	7	0	10
TOTALS	794	1,619	1,219	408	4,040

==== Cobra Convertible ====
Interior / Roof	Ultra White	Ebony	Rio Red	Electric Green	Totals
Charcoal / Black	278	1,287	598	89	2,252
Charcoal / Parchment	0	9	0	0	9
Charcoal / White	63	8	16	10	97
Parchment / Black	2	134	28	11	175
Parchment / Parchment	349	317	608	208	1,482
Parchment / White	38	0	0	0	38
Other	1	0	1	0	2
TOTALS	731	1,755	1,251	318	4,055

==== Total 1999 production ====
Year	Model	Production
1999	Cobra Coupe	4,040
1999	Cobra Convertible	4,055
1999	TOTAL	8,095

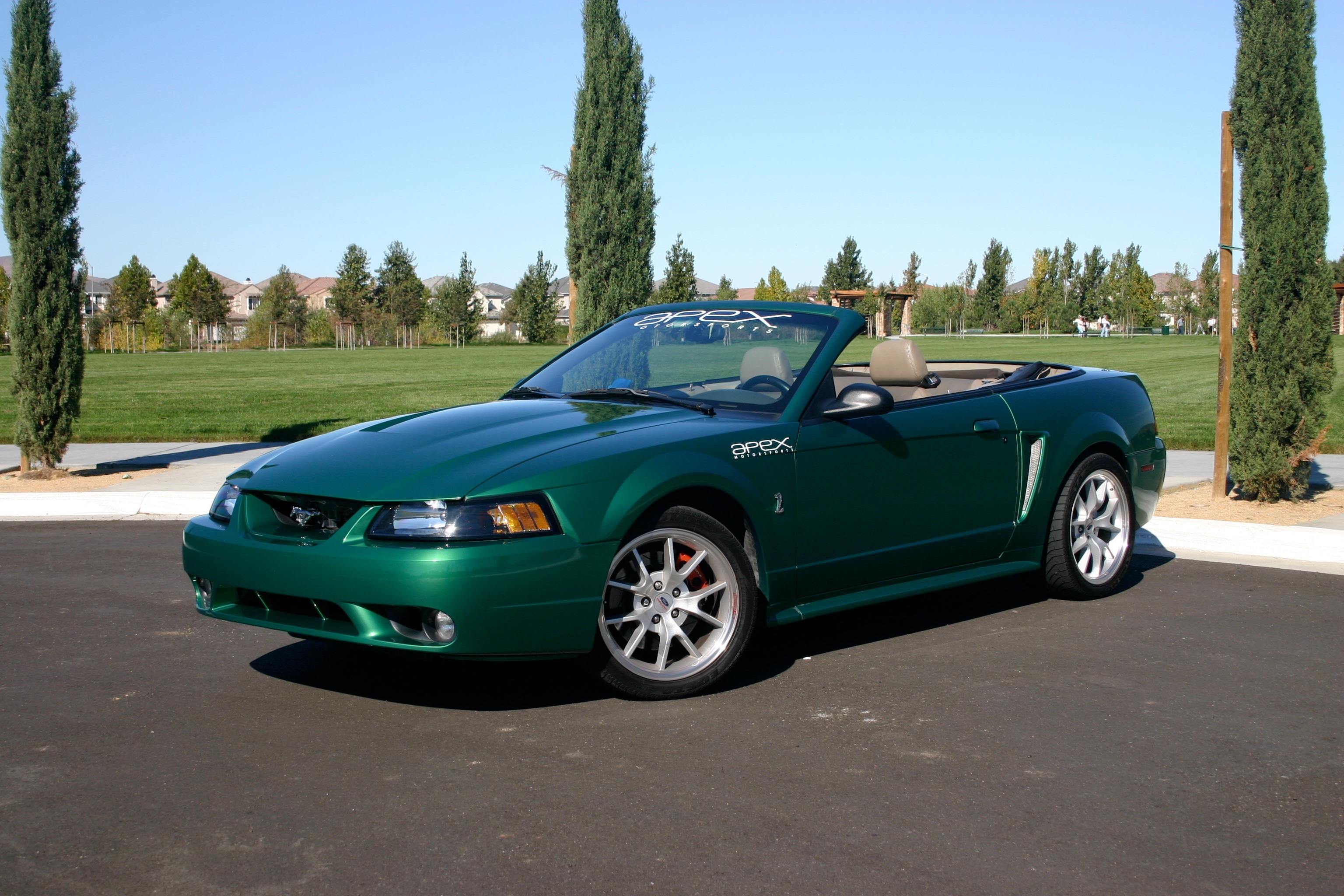
1999 SVT Cobra convertible (with modified wheels and seats).

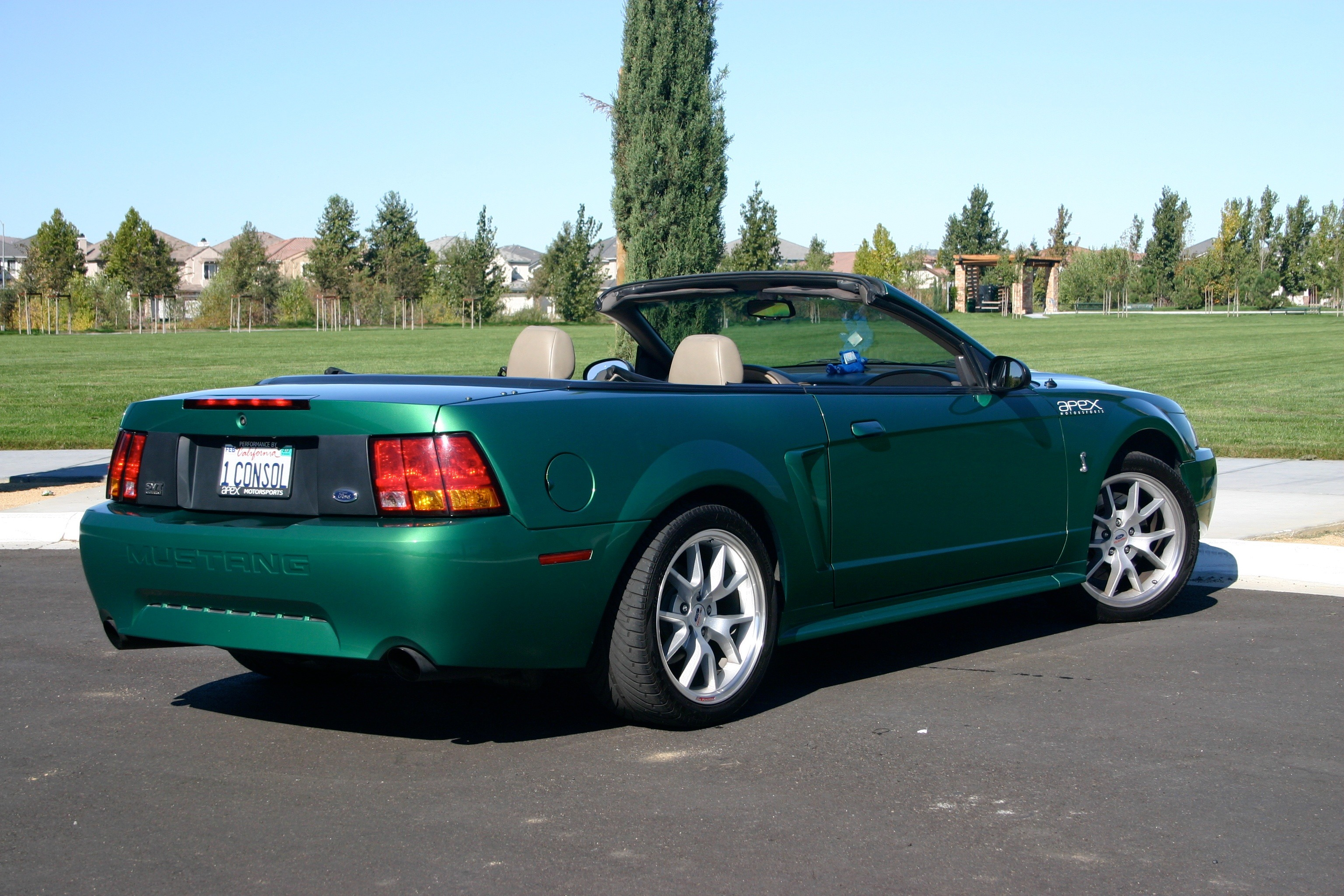
1999 SVT Cobra convertible rear view (with modified wheels and seats).

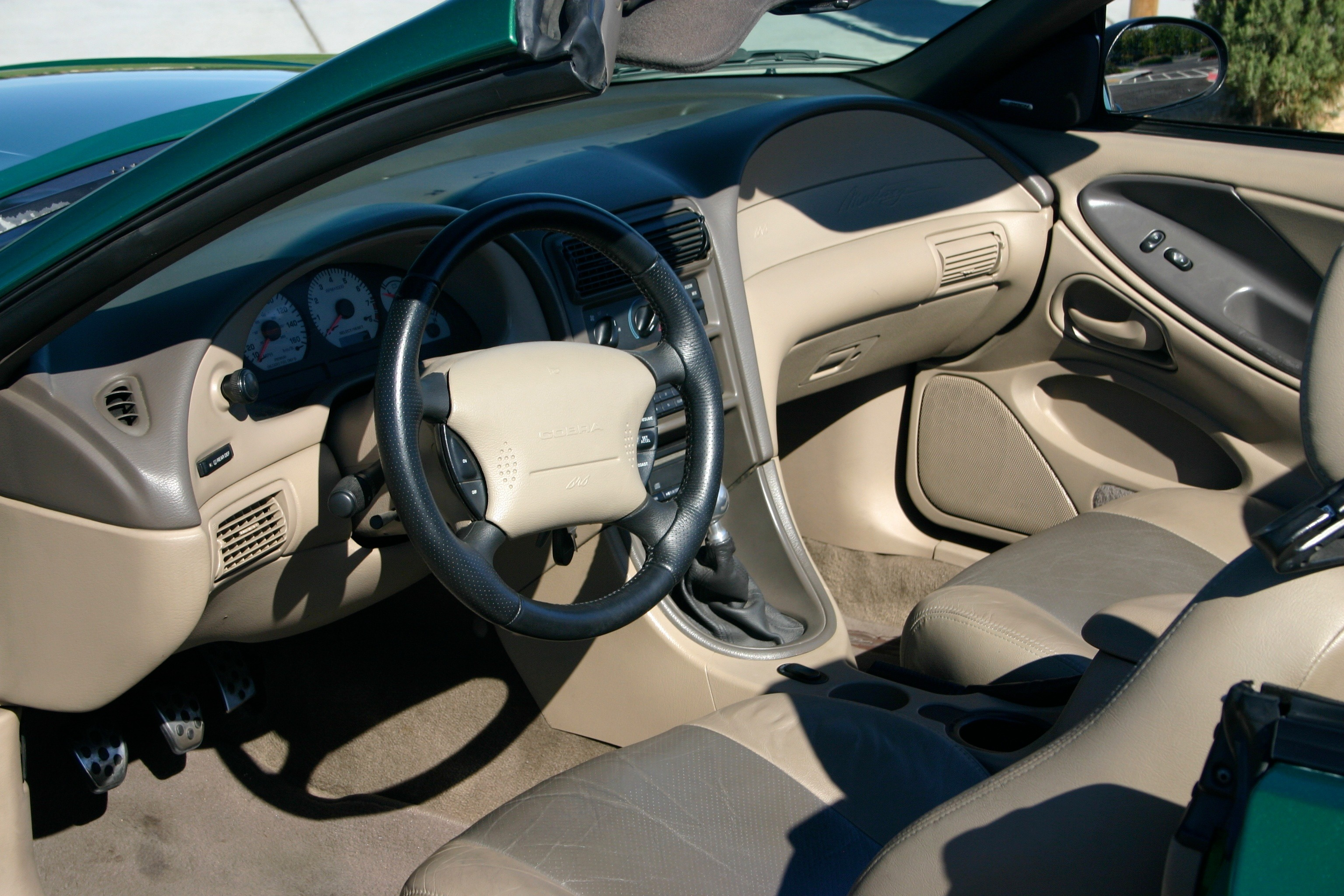
1999 SVT Cobra convertible with Medium Parchment interior. Note the modified steering wheel and seats.

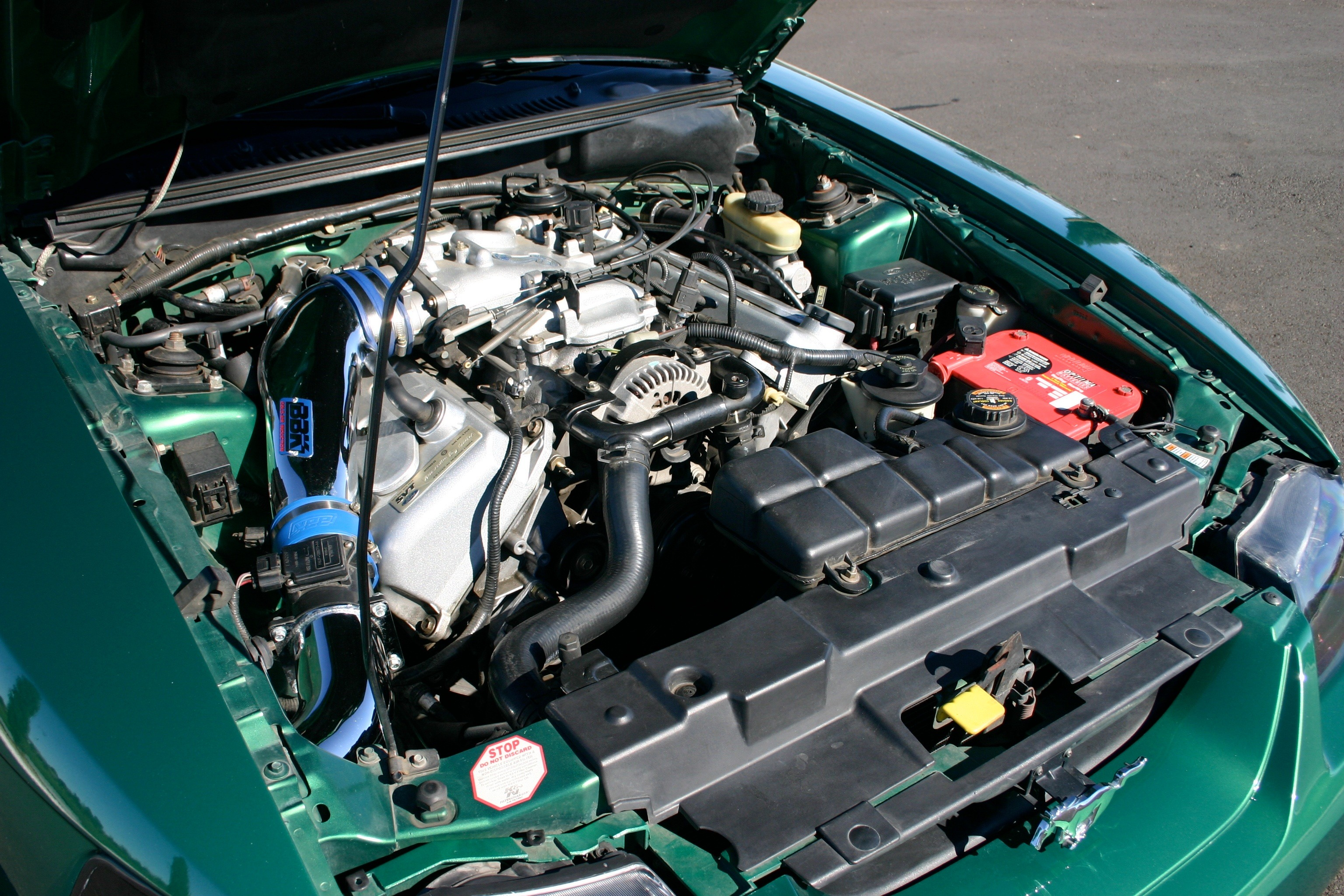
1999 SVT Cobra convertible engine with a modified intake and battery.

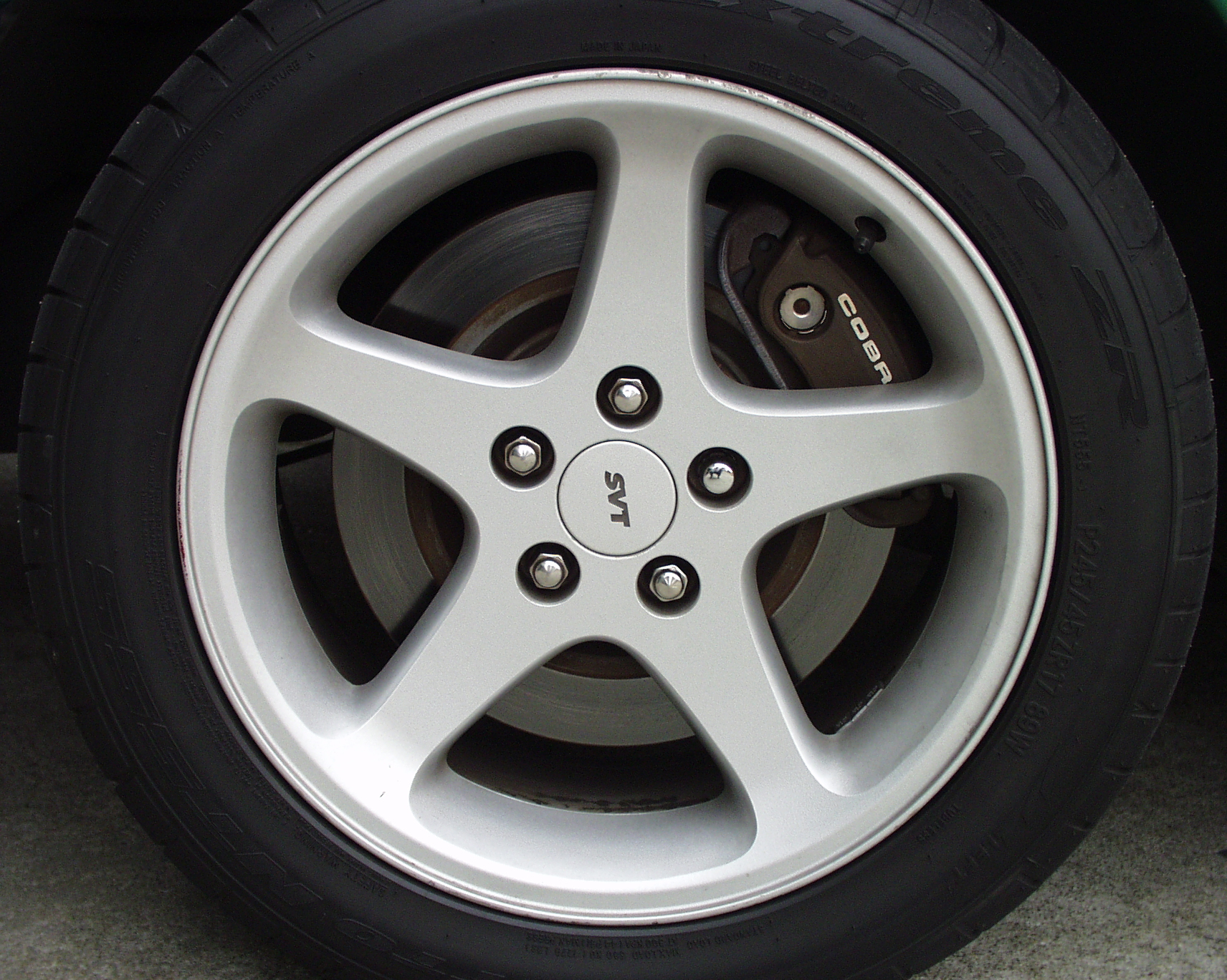
The stock 17x8-inch silver wheels and disc brakes on a 1999 SVT Cobra.

=== 2000 ===
==== Cobra R ====
2000 SVT Mustang Cobra R
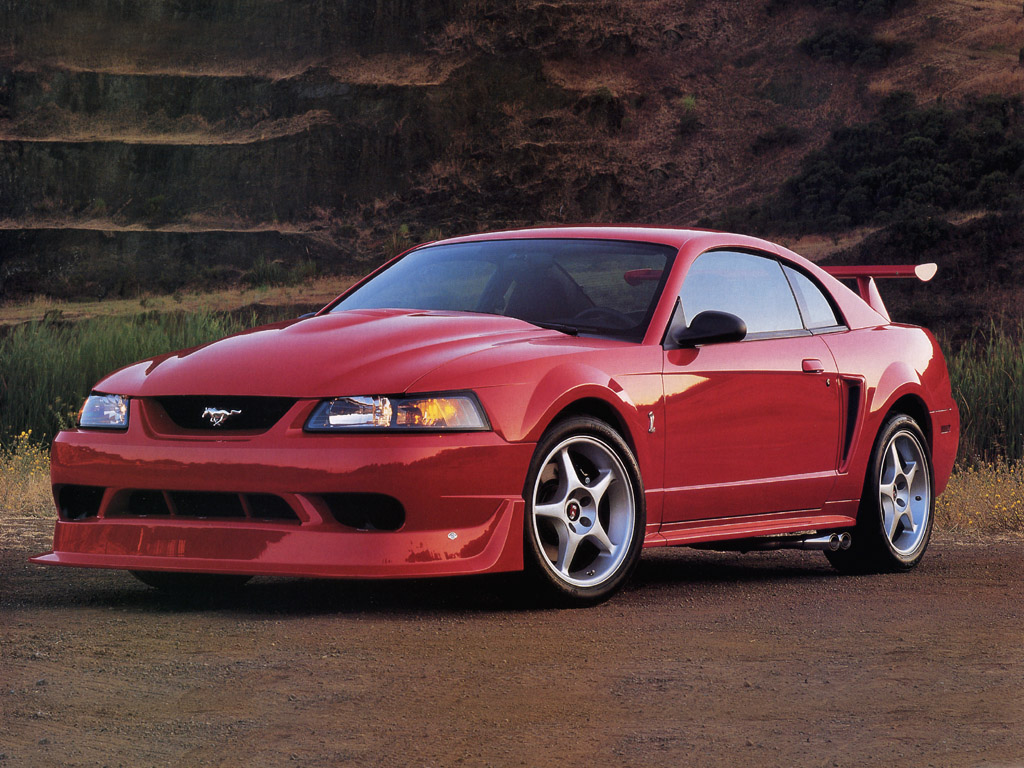

Overview
- Manufacturer: SVT
- Model years: 2000 (300 produced)
- Designer: Team Mustang

Body and chassis
- Body style: 2-door coupe

Powertrain
- Engine: 385hp 5.4 L DOHC Modular V8 (2000 Cobra R)
- Transmission: 6-speed T-56 manual

Dimensions
- Wheelbase: 101.3 in (2,573 mm)
- Length: 183.5 in (4,661 mm)
- Width: 73.1 in (1,857 mm)
- Height: 52.2 in (1,326 mm)
- Curb weight: 3,590 lb (1,628 kg)

For 2000, the SVT Cobra R returned for a limited production run of 300 units. The new Cobra R became the sole high-performance Mustang for the 2000 model year, as plans to produce the standard Cobra for that model year were shelved after the public outcry over the performance of the 1999 Cobras. It came standard with a 5,409 cc (5.4 L; 330.1 cu in) DOHC V8 engine with a 6,500 rpm redline that was rated at 385 bhp (390 PS; 287 kW) at 5,700 rpm and 385 lb⋅ft (522 N⋅m) of torque at 4,500 rpm. However, independent dyno tests showed that the Cobra R produced rear-wheel output that nearly matched both of those numbers, suggesting the engine may have been underrated. The cast-iron block was based on the 5.4 L block that Ford used in its trucks at the time. The cylinder heads were later used in the 2005–2006 Ford GT, albeit slightly modified. Some sources claimed that the Australian FPV GT's engine was very similar to the Cobra R's engine. As with previous Cobra R models, the 2000 model lacked many of the comforts of the standard Cobra, and as such had no radio/audio equipment, air conditioning, cruise control, or a rear seat. All 300 units produced were finished in Performance Red with a Dark Charcoal interior with cloth Recaro bucket seats.

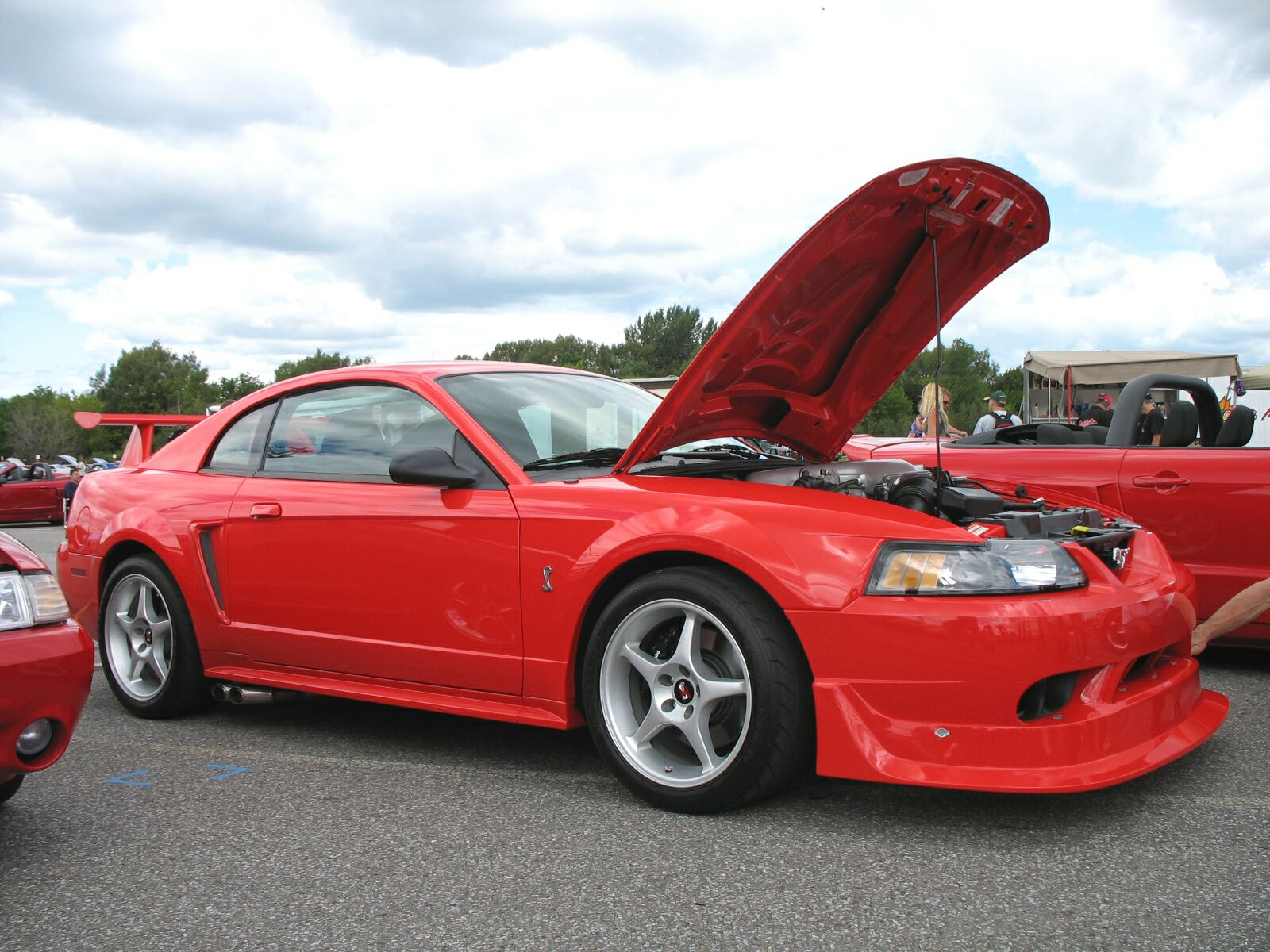
Cobra R with hood open

The 2000 Cobra R had several distinguishing visual and performance features that set it apart from the standard 1999 or 2001 Cobra. The "power dome" hood was taller than the standard Cobra hood, and it had gills that could be cut out to help reduce engine compartment temperatures. The rear spoiler was tall and wide. The Cobra R was equipped with Eibach springs that lowered the car 1.5 inches in front and 1.0 inch out back. This model also used Bilstein shocks and struts, Brembo 4-piston front calipers with 13-inch rotors were cooled by large ducts, along with a race-style fuel cell that protruded under the Mustang V6-style rear bumper. The front fascia featured a low-riding, removable splitter. The wheels were uniquely styled, silver-painted, five-spoke, 18-inch (460 mm) x 9.5-inch (240 mm) alloys with BF Goodrich G-Force KD tires. The hand-built SVT engine employed special DOHC cylinder heads, a "trumpet-style" intake manifold, aggressive camshafts, short tube headers connected to Cobra catalysts, a Bassani X-pipe, and a unique Borla dual side-exiting exhaust system, which was necessitated by the large fuel cell. This model also featured 3.55 gears, a Gerodisc hydro-mechanical differential with speed and torque sensitivity, and a Tremec T-56 6-speed manual transmission that was closely geared for drag racing or road course usage. The 2000 Cobra R was rated to achieve a 177 mph (282 km/h) top speed.

Aftermarket performance parts vendors contributed to this project, including Recaro, Brembo, McLeod, Eibach, BF Goodrich, Tremec, Borla, Dana, Federal Mogul, and K&N.

The following is a list of parts on the 2000 Cobra R that differ from the standard 1999 Cobra:

Exterior

- Only available as a coupe.
- Only available in Performance Red (paint code ES).
- V6-style rear bumper with no exhaust cutouts.
- 20-gallon Fuel Safe fuel cell, visible from behind and the side.
- Borla side exhaust, since the standard exhaust would not fit due to the fuel cell.
- Large unique wing on the rear decklid.
- 18-inch five-spoke wheels.
- Removable splitter on the front fascia.
- Blacked-out headlights, which later became standard on all 2001–2004 Mustangs.
- Omitted fog lights (air ducts to the front brakes instead).
- Special hood with a large dome to clear the huge intake.
- Omitted antenna (covered with a black plastic piece).

Interior

- Only available in Dark Charcoal (trim code DW).
- Cloth-upholstered Recaro seats (manually adjustable).
- Backseat delete.
- No air conditioning.
- No radio.
- No cruise control.

Drivetrain

- 5.4 L DOHC V8 engine based on Ford's truck engines.
- Tremec T-56 6-speed transmission.
- 3.55:1 gears.
- Hydro-mechanical lock differential.
- 13-inch Brembo vented brake disks with 4-piston calipers in the front.
- Vented brake disks in the rear.
- Special Eibach shocks and springs, lowering the car by 1.5-inches in front and 1.0-inch in rear.

===== Paint and interior trim =====
The 2000 Cobra R was only available in one exterior paint color, Performance Red. The sole interior color choice was dark charcoal. The standard cloth Recaro bucket seats had a stylized red "R" with an intertwined Cobra logo embroidered on the front seatbacks.

===== 2000 SVT Cobra R base price =====
The price below is in United States dollars when the vehicles were sold new at a Ford dealership before any available options were added.

Model	VIN Code	MSRP
Cobra R coupe	P47H	$54,995

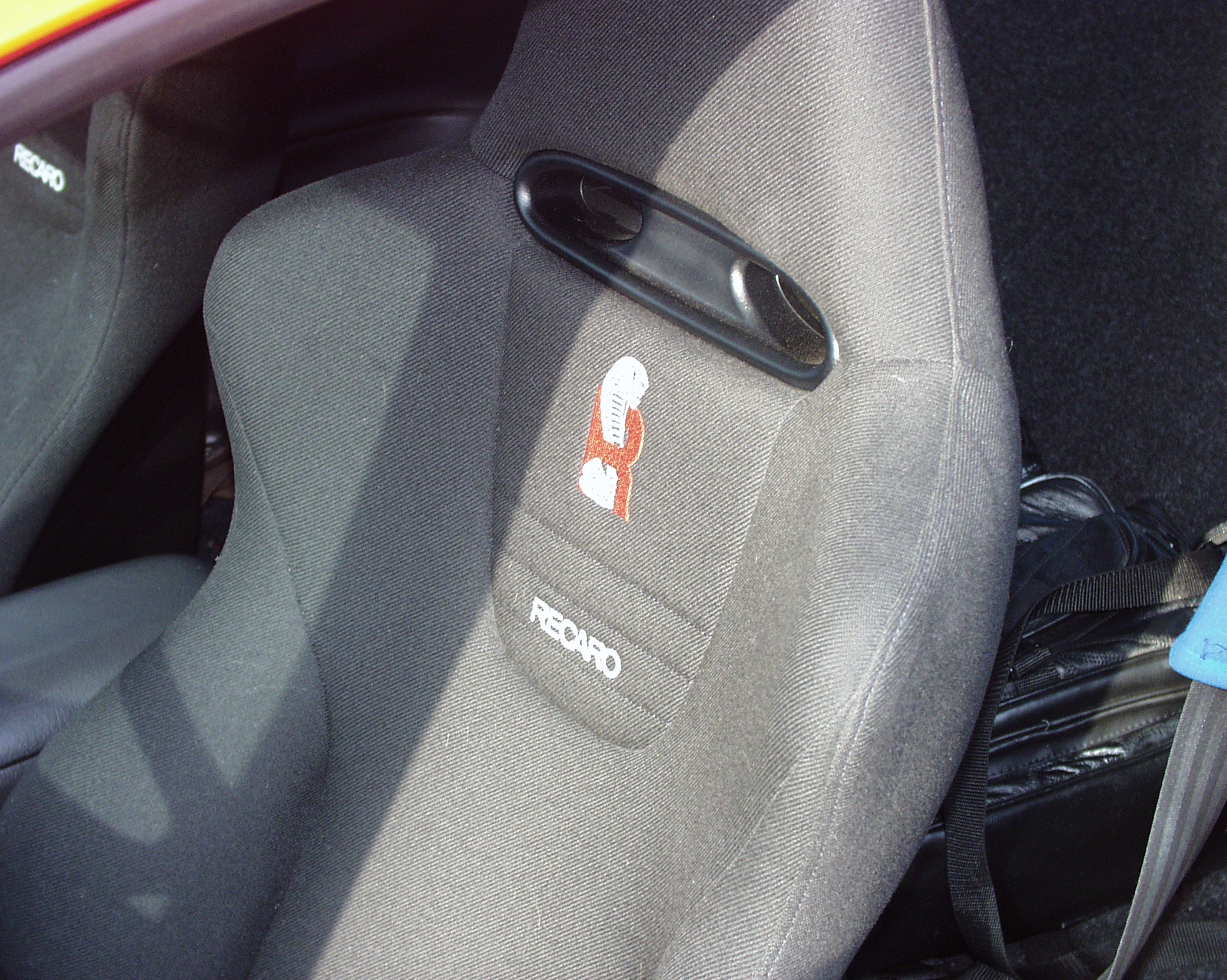
The backrest of the stock 2000 SVT Cobra R Recaro driver seat.

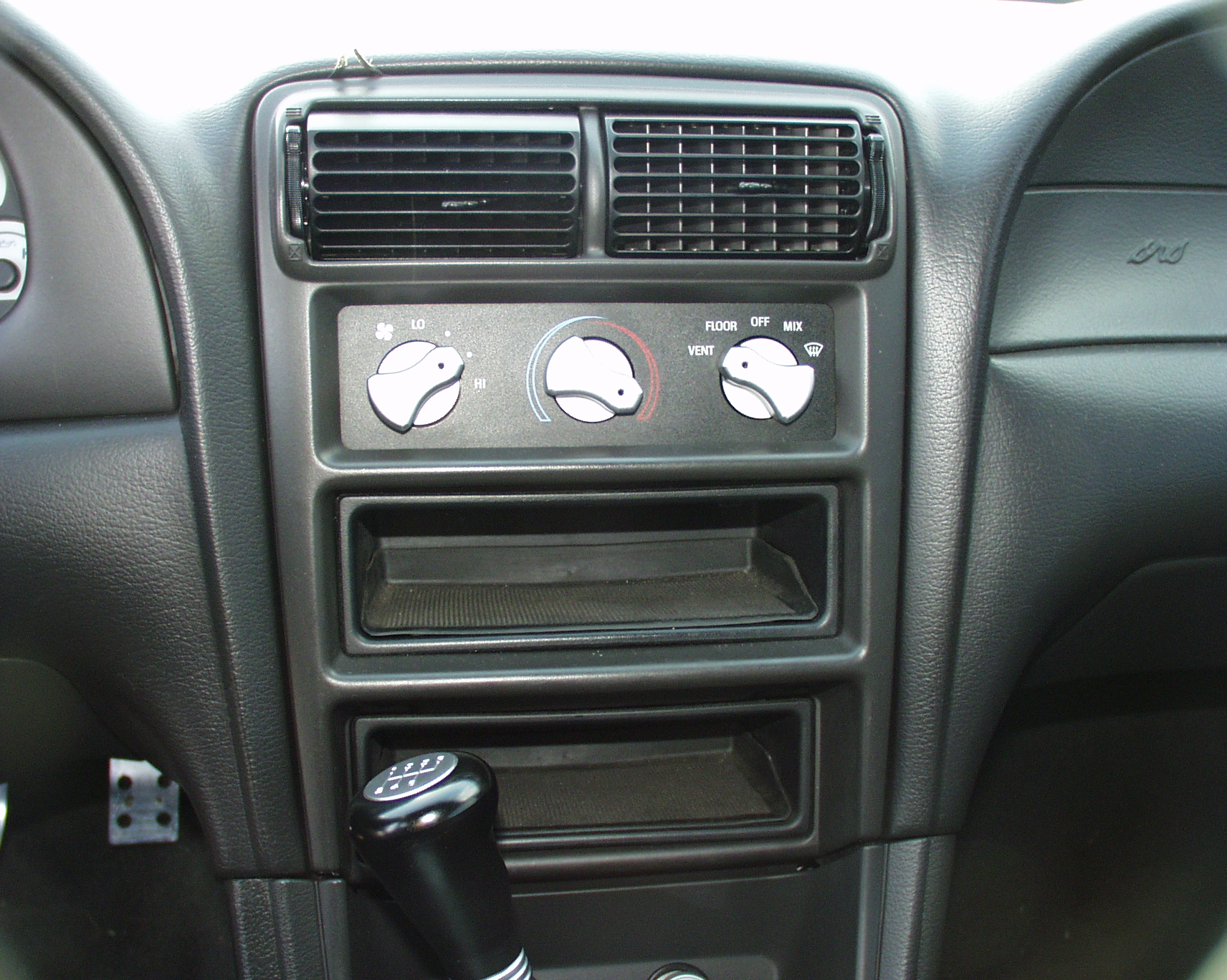
The center console of a 2000 SVT Cobra R with the deleted radio and A/C, but modified with aluminum knobs.

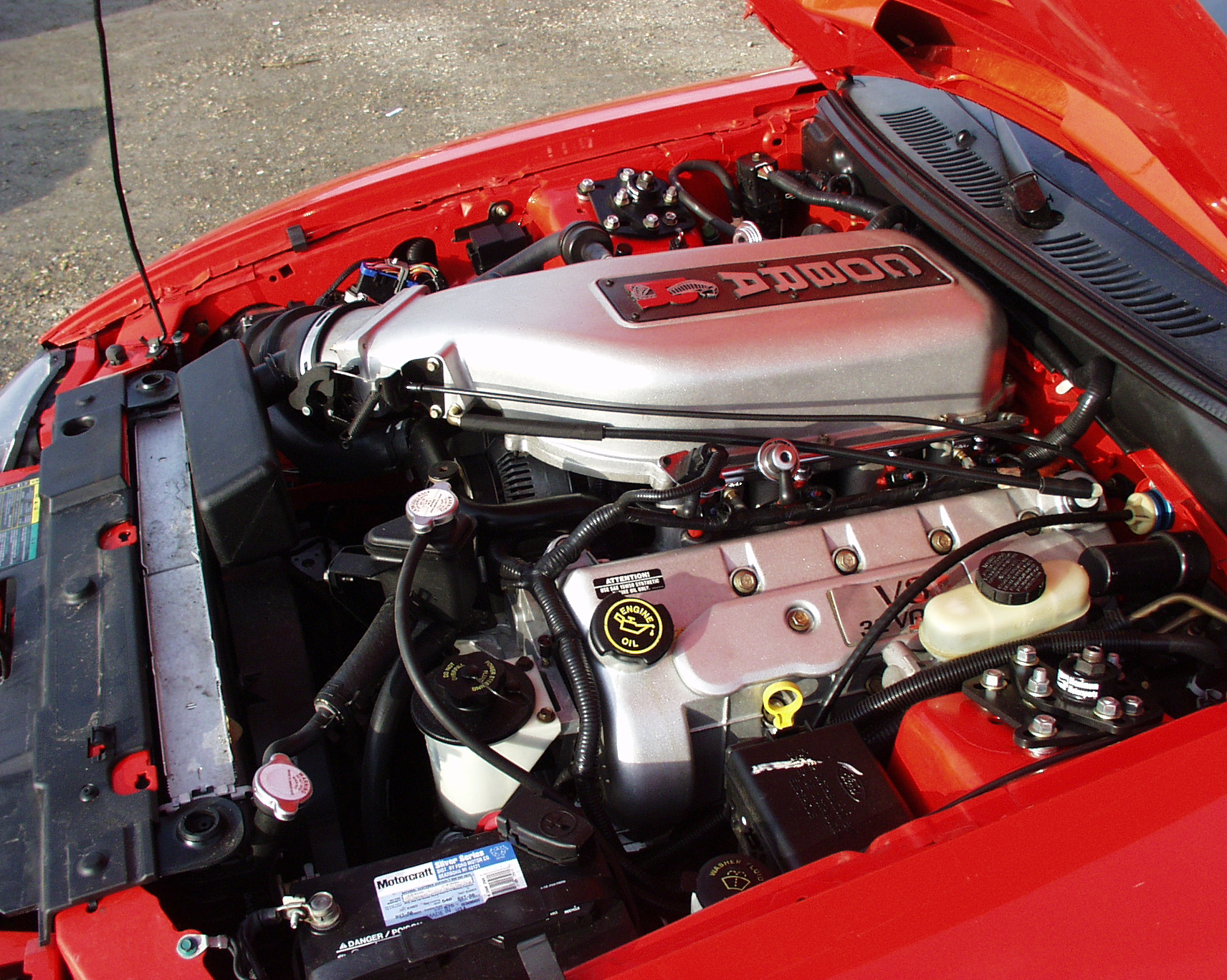
2000 SVT Cobra R engine, modified with MM caster/camber plates and firewall adjuster for the clutch.

==== Cobra (standard; cancelled) ====
Following its introduction in 1999, the redesigned New Edge-styled Cobra was planned to return for the 2000 model year. However, due to the performance debacle of the 1999 Cobras, Ford had halted sales of all unsold 1999 Cobra models and recalled all sold 1999 Cobras. Consequently, Ford then cancelled plans to release the standard Cobra model for the 2000 model year, leaving the 2000 Cobra R as the only model of the Cobra as a whole produced for that model year. Despite this, Ford had already started to print out brochures for the 2000 Cobra beginning as early as December 1999, four months after plans for the 2000 Cobra were cancelled. The brochure contained both the standard Cobra and the race-oriented Cobra R, the latter of which would become the only model of the Cobra made for the 2000 model year.

According to the aforementioned brochure, had the 2000 Cobra been produced, it would have been available in both coupe and convertible models with six exterior paint color options (all of which are clearcoat paints): Crystal White, Ebony, Laser Red, Medium Atlantic Blue, Silver, and (most notably) Mystic Gold. Apparently, Mystic Gold was supposed to be available in limited quantities late in the model year, according to the brochure. Aside from the paint colors, the standard 2000 Cobra was pretty much meant to be a carryover of the 1999 model (including the internals; the same 4.6 L DOHC V8 engine from the 1999 model would have returned with minimal changes). Even the interior was supposed to be the same as the 1999 model, including the sole option of leather seats. Interior choices would have been offered in the same colors as found on the 1999 model, dark charcoal and medium parchment.

===== 2000 Mystic Gold Cobra (cancelled) =====
After the release of the 1996 Mystic Cobra, Ford had planned to introduce the Mystic Gold Cobra for the 2000 model year as part of the 2000 Cobras, which would have been the second time a color-shifting paint was used on the Cobra. Meant to have color-shifting pigments (which would have been supplied by BASF) like the Mystic Cobra, the Mystic Gold paint was a gold-colored variation of the original Mystic paint from 1996 that would shift from burnt orange to gold to yellow to pale green depending on the angle and availability of light. Much like the 1996 Mystic Cobra, the 2000 Mystic Gold Cobra would have been produced in limited quantities late in the model year, and was supposed to be offered exclusively in the Cobra coupe. Only a few examples of the Mystic Gold Cobra for the planned 2000 model year were produced, and one example was shown in a brochure that contained both the standard 2000 Cobras and the 2000 Cobra R.

Because Ford cancelled the 2000 Cobras after the 1999 Cobra performance debacle, the 2000 Mystic Gold Cobra (and subsequently the standard 2000 Cobra) never went into production, coupled with the fact that Ford made some changes to the painting process of its vehicles during the 2001 model year, making the Mystic Gold paint incompatible with it in the process. The Mystic Gold paint was most likely discarded after it had received no use due to the cancellation of the 2000 Cobra and the painting process change in the 2001 model year, and the use of color-shifting paint on the Cobra would not be revisited again until the introduction of the Mystichrome Cobra for the 2004 model year.

=== 2001 ===
The Cobra returned for the 2001 model year after skipping one model year to resolve the performance issues of the 1999 Cobras. While the 2001 Cobra shared almost all the same components of the 1999 Cobra, some changes were made including:

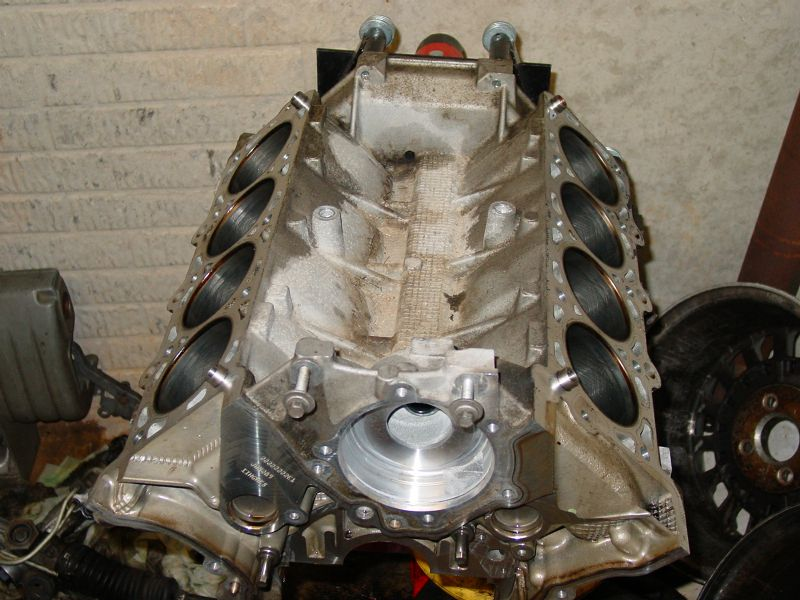
A Teksid block

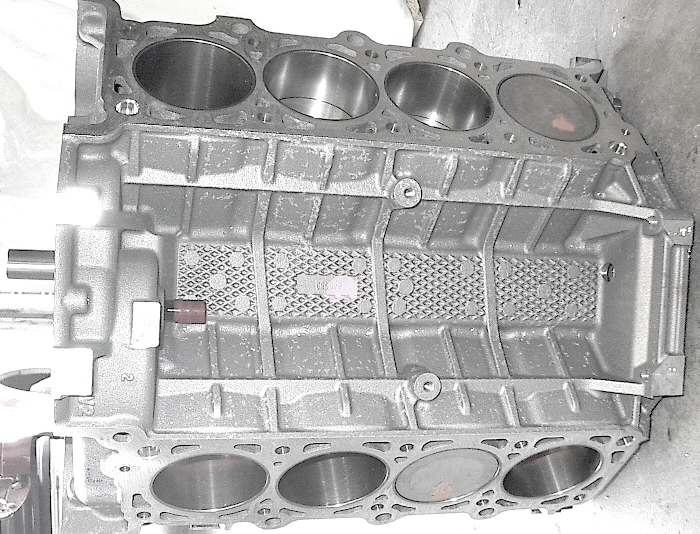
A Windsor Aluminum Plant block

- The engine block was changed from the Teksid block to the Windsor Aluminum Plant (or WAP) block. The WAP block is regarded to be weaker than the previous Teksid block. Some 2001 Cobras received the Teksid block, either from the factory or as a replacement motor. In the pictures at right, note the extra ribs designed to impart strength to the weaker WAP. Also, note that the hatching in the valley of the Teksid is square, while the WAP has diagonal hatching.
- Revised cylinder heads. Cobra owners have reported a "ticking" or "pinging" noise coming from the driver-side head of their cars. Due to insufficient cooling around cylinders #6/#7/#8 which caused the valves to overheat and therefore seat improperly, Ford remedied the situation by issuing a technical service bulletin (TSB#03256/NHTSA#10008278 and TSB#03164/NHTSA#10003118) to remove and replace the affected heads with a version that featured improved coolant flow.
- Cobra-specific seats with a combination of leather bolsters, Alcantara (suede-like microfiber) inserts, and larger headrests. 1999 Cobras had regular Mustang GT seats.
- A rear bumper that reads "COBRA" instead of "MUSTANG" like on the 1999 Cobra.
- A rear badge on the trunk lid was changed to read "SVT" instead of "SVT COBRA" like on the 1999 Cobra.
- A new steering wheel and an upgraded Mach audio system.
- The wheels for both the 1999 and 2001 Cobras were 17x8-inch. Silver-powdercoated, five-spoke aluminum wheels were available in 1999 and 2001, and chrome wheels of the same design were an available option for the 2001 Cobra.
- The Tremec T-45 transmission in 1999 was replaced by the Tremec TR-3650 transmission in 2001.
- The axle shafts and differential were changed from 28 splines in 1999 to 31 splines in 2001.
- The rear decklid spoiler was redesigned.
- The 1999 two-piece audio unit consisting of a radio with a tape deck and a separate single-CD player was upgraded to a larger, single-face, 6-disc unit in 2001.
- The center console and trim were redesigned.
- The buttons for the fog lights, the rear window defroster, and the anti-skid system were moved to a panel below the new radio unit.
- The emergency brake was fitted with a boot of leather to cover the cutout in the console.
- The headlights were changed from a chrome background to a black background. The newer headlights are sometimes referred to as "smoked" or "tinted", but this only refers to the black background. The actual lenses are clear for both years. These blacked-out headlights were first used on the 2000 Cobra R and then rolled out across the entire Mustang lineup for the 2001 model year.
- The color of the odometer digits and instrument cluster lighting was slightly changed.

With the above list of changes (not including cosmetic changes), the 2001 Cobra was able to go 0-60 mph in 5.4 seconds and do the quarter-mile in 13.8 seconds at 102 mph. The cars were electronically limited to a top speed of 150 mph.

==== Paint and interior trim ====
The 2001 Cobra was available in eight exterior paint colors, as shown in the table below. There were only two interior color choices: dark charcoal (the interior was dark charcoal with the seats having dark charcoal leather bolsters with medium graphite Alcantara inserts) or medium parchment (the interior was medium parchment, but the seats had chocolate brown leather bolsters with medium parchment Alcantara inserts). The Cobra emblem on the front seatbacks was embroidered in a somewhat darker color than the suede inserts to provide a subtle contrast. On Cobra convertibles, the vinyl top was available in black, parchment, or white, and was the same one used on regular 2001 Mustang convertibles.

==== 2001 SVT Cobra base prices ====
All prices below are in United States dollars when the vehicles were sold new at a Ford dealership before any available options were added.

Model	VIN Code	MSRP
Cobra coupe	P47V	$28,605
Cobra convertible	P46V	$32,605

=== 2001 detailed production numbers ===
==== Cobra Coupe ====
Interior	Crystal White	Ebony	Performance Red	Laser Red	Zinc Yellow	True Blue	Silver	Mineral Grey	Totals
Dark Charcoal	227	827	226	330	347	229	556	459	3,201
Medium Parchment	146	152	0	226	0	87	0	55	666
TOTALS	373	979	226	556	347	316	556	514	3,867

==== Cobra Convertible ====
Interior / Roof	Crystal White	Ebony	Performance Red	Laser Red	Zinc Yellow	True Blue	Silver	Mineral Grey	Totals
Charcoal / Black	125	759	130	238	316	163	431	356	2,518
Charcoal / White	32	0	0	0	0	0	0	0	32
Parchment / Black	6	52	0	13	0	12	0	26	109
Parchment / Parchment	180	131	0	297	0	117	0	0	725
TOTALS	343	942	130	548	316	292	431	382	3,384

==== Total 2001 production ====
Year	Model	Production
2001	Cobra Coupe	3,867
2001	Cobra Convertible	3,384
2001	TOTAL	7,251

=== 2002 ===
Approximately 100 vehicles were partially built in the US and shipped to Australia for right-hand-drive conversion and final assembly by Ford Tickford Experience (FTE). This was part of a $4 million program by Ford Australia to combat the rival Holden Monaro (which eventually formed the basis of the 2004–2006 Pontiac GTO in the U.S.). The vehicles were based on the 2001-spec SVT Cobra, and included modifications such as the steering wheel being mounted on the right hand side of the car rather than the left (to accommodate for the appropriate road traffic direction in the region), and other changes such as differently mounted windshield wipers (which wipe from left to right instead of right to left) and additional driving lights in the lower front fascia to meet Australian lighting specifications.

==== Total 1999–2002 production ====
Year	Model	Production
1999	Cobra Coupe	4,040
1999	Cobra Convertible	4,055
1999	Total	8,095
2000	Cobra R Coupe	300
2000	Total	300
2001	Cobra Coupe	3,867
2001	Cobra Convertible	3,384
2001	Total	7,251
2002	Total	100
TOTAL		15,746 (including exports)

== 2003–2004: Terminator Cobra ==
Terminator (Supercharged) Modular SVT Mustang Cobra
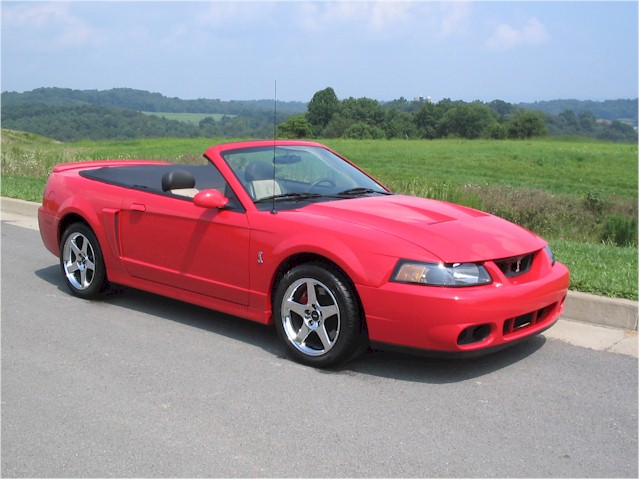

Overview
- Manufacturer: SVT
- Model years: 2003–2004 (19,140 produced)
- Designer: SVT Engineering

Body and chassis
- Body style: 2-door coupe 2-door convertible

Powertrain
- Engine: 390hp 4.6 L 32V Supercharged DOHC Modular V8
- Transmission: 6-speed T-56 manual

Dimensions
- Wheelbase: 101.3 in (2,573 mm)
- Length: 183.5 in (4,661 mm)
- Width: 73.1 in (1,857 mm)
- Height: Coupe: 52.5 in (1,334 mm); Convertible: 52.9 in (1,344 mm)
- Curb weight: Coupe: 3,665 lb (1,662 kg); Convertible: 3,780 lb (1,715 kg)

Chronology
- Successor: 2007 Shelby GT500

=== 2003 ===
Debuting in the spring of 2002, the 2003 Cobra came with a supercharged, 32-valve DOHC, 4.6-liter V8 engine rated at 390 hp (291 kW) and 390 lb⋅ft (530 N⋅m) of torque. Code-named "Terminator" by the SVT development crew led by John Coletti, numerous improvements were made to the powertrain and driveline to handle the power increase from the previous model's set-up. A cast-iron block was used, instead of the previous Teksid aluminum unit, with stronger internals including Zollner pistons and forged Manley H-beam connecting rods that were modified with a wrist pin oiling hole by the SVT engineers. These upgrades were critical in order to support the 8 psi (0.55 bar) of boost delivered from the stock Eaton M-112 roots-type supercharger. Other improvements included the use of a lightweight aluminum flywheel connected to a Tremec T-56 six-speed transmission, 3.55:1 rear axle ratio, and stronger 31-spline half-shafts with revised upper and lower control arms. These modifications enabled the Cobra to go 0-60 mph in 4.5 seconds and do the quarter mile in 12.67 seconds at 110.11 mph. Although electronically governed to a top speed of 153 mph, a factory-stock Terminator Cobra can reach a top speed of just under 180 mph if the governor is removed.

The 2003 Cobra boasted visual and functional improvements designed by Camilo Pardo, the chief designer of the 2005–2006 Ford GT supercar. These exterior differences included a new front fascia with an integrated spoiler and front brake air ducts, a new rear fascia with a black insert that visually integrated the exhaust pipes, a composite hood with dual functional heat extractors, newly designed side scoops, and foldable side-view mirrors painted in the matching body color. The side skirts were designed specifically for the Terminator Cobra body kit, featuring a smooth body line from the door to the bottom of the car. As a visual departure from the 1999, 2000, and 2001 Cobras (there was no 2002 Cobra model), which featured the Australian Mustang taillights with separate amber turn signals, the 2003–2004 Cobras used standard red Mustang taillights with integrated turn signals. SVT also introduced new five-spoke 17x9-inch wheels, available in standard machined-faced aluminum with metallic argent-painted pockets or optional chrome. Finally, the Terminator Cobra sported a new decklid spoiler with an integrated LED brake light, as opposed to the wing-type spoiler seen on previous Cobras and the standard Mustang V6 and GT models. It was optional to delete the spoiler, and the brake light was then integrated into the decklid using conventional bulbs.

==== Paint and interior trim ====
By the end of the model year, the 2003 Cobra was offered in ten exterior paint colors, but initially, it was available in seven colors. Early 2003 Cobras built between May and September 2002 were produced concurrently with the 2002 Mustang V6 and GT models. Since Satin Silver and Mineral Grey were 2002 colors, they were replaced with Silver Metallic and Dark Shadow Grey Metallic, respectively, at the start of regular 2003 Mustang production on September 29, 2002. Redfire Metallic replaced Torch Red only because it was a new color for the 2003 model year; however, Torch Red would make a comeback at the end of the model year on the 10th Anniversary Edition (see the next section). All 2003 Cobras had Dark Charcoal interiors. The seats were upholstered with Dark Charcoal Nudo leather bolsters and suede inserts in either Medium Graphite (light gray) or Medium Parchment (tan). The Cobra emblem on the front seatbacks was embroidered in a color that matched the suede inserts; however, on the 10th Anniversary Edition, this same emblem was embroidered in dark charcoal-colored thread to contrast with the special red leather inserts. On Cobra convertibles, the canvas convertible top was either black or parchment depending on the color of the chosen suede seat inserts, and on 10th Anniversary Edition convertibles, the canvas convertible top was only available in black.

==== 2003 SVT Cobra base prices ====
All prices below are in United States dollars when the vehicles were sold new at a Ford dealership before any available options were added.

Model	VIN Code	MSRP
Cobra coupe	P48Y	$33,460
Cobra convertible	P49Y	$37,835

=== 2003 10th Anniversary Edition ===
For 2003, SVT offered a limited-edition 10th Anniversary Cobra to commemorate ten years of the first SVT Mustang Cobra in 1993. The car featured unique seven-spoke, dark argent-painted, 17-inch alloy wheels; Dark Charcoal interior with Colorado Red leather inserts on the seats; red inserts in the door panels; red-painted brake calipers; and special 10th Anniversary badges on the decklid and floormats. Also included were special carbon fiber-patterned leather wrapped around the shifter; emergency brake handle; and on the steering wheel at the 10, 2, and 6 o'clock positions. The Anniversary model was the first Cobra to feature a steering wheel with grip humps at the 10 and 2 o'clock positions. SVT produced 2,003 units of the Anniversary model at the end of the model year during June and July 2003, totaling 1,003 coupes and 1,000 convertibles. The 10th Anniversary models were only available in three exterior colors: Black (775 models), Torch Red (734 models), and Silver Metallic (494 models). The 10th Anniversary Edition package (order code 375A) was a $1,495 option.

=== 2003 detailed production numbers ===
==== Cobra Coupe ====
Interior	Oxford White	Ebony	Torch Red	Redfire	Zinc Yellow	Sonic Blue	Satin Silver	Mineral Grey	Silver	Dark Shadow Grey	Totals
Graphite suede	451	1,618	214	758	490	1,029	242	302	735	851	6,690
Parchment suede	170	252	59	197	0	23	0	0	0	0	701
Red leather	0	381	365	0	0	0	0	0	257	0	1,003
TOTALS	621	2,251	638	955	490	1,052	242	302	992	851	8,394

==== Cobra Convertible ====
Interior	Oxford White	Ebony	Torch Red	Redfire	Zinc Yellow	Sonic Blue	Satin Silver	Mineral Grey	Silver	Dark Shadow Grey	Totals
Graphite suede	171	1,095	157	414	319	340	81	154	311	446	3,488
Parchment suede	137	190	56	196	0	15	0	0	0	0	594
Red leather	0	394	369	0	0	0	0	0	237	0	1,000
TOTALS	308	1,679	582	610	319	355	81	154	548	446	5,082

==== Total 2003 production ====
Year	Model	Production
2003	Cobra Coupe	8,394
2003	Cobra Convertible	5,082
2003	TOTAL	13,476

=== 2004 ===
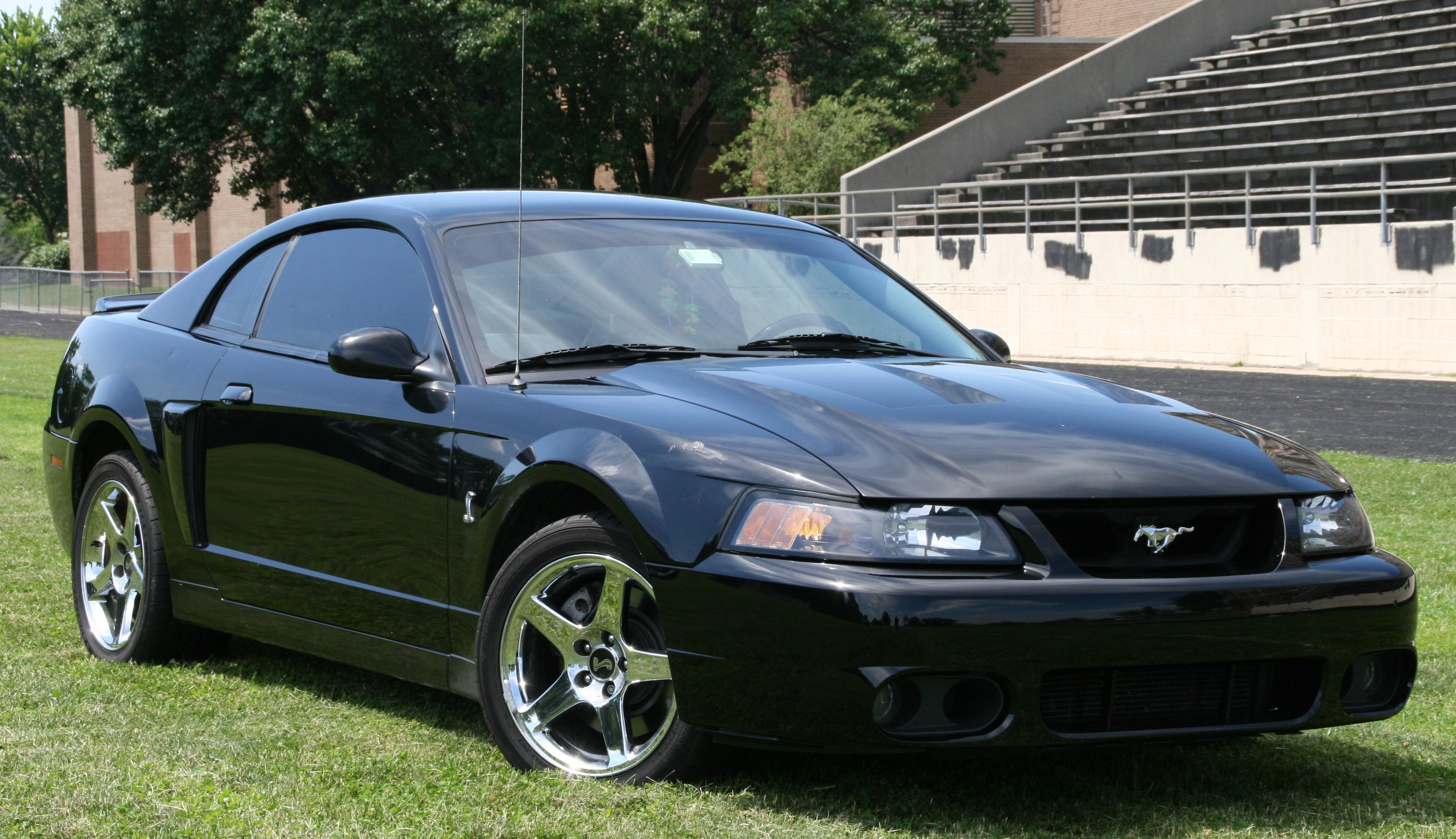
2004 SVT Cobra coupe

The 2004 Cobra was a carryover of the 2003 Cobra but with a few minor updates, including a slightly updated exhaust system and rumors of a 20+ horsepower increase over the 2003 model. The addition of a newly integrated shift light negated the $1,000 gas guzzler tax that was charged on the 2003 models. One notable new option across the entire Ford lineup was the available Sirius satellite radio; the distinguishing feature between the 2003 and 2004 factory sound systems was the "SAT" button on the 2004 system.

The 2004 Cobra was produced between November 2003 and March 2004. It was a short model year for the 2004 Terminator Cobra, as well as the entire 2004 Mustang lineup, due to a number of reasons. The 2004 Mustangs and Cobras were the last Mustangs to be built at Ford's historic Dearborn Assembly Plant in Dearborn, Michigan, and Ford Motor Company had made the decision to end Mustang production there rather than updating the plant for the 2005 models. Thus, 2004 production was scheduled to wrap up by May 2004. Another reason was the hype over the all-new 2005 Mustang, which meant that Ford needed to start production as soon as possible at the newly updated Flat Rock Assembly Plant in Flat Rock, Michigan, then known as AutoAlliance International.

==== Paint and interior trim ====
The 2004 Cobra was available in eight exterior paint colors, as shown in the table below. Zinc Yellow was replaced by Screaming Yellow across the Mustang lineup for 2004; however, Sonic Blue Metallic and Dark Shadow Grey Metallic were still available on regular 2004 Mustangs. The seats were upholstered with Dark Charcoal Nudo leather bolsters and suede inserts in either Dark Charcoal or Medium Graphite. Medium Parchment suede inserts were no longer offered. The Cobra emblem on the front seatbacks was embroidered in a medium graphite-colored thread regardless of the color of the suede seat inserts; however, on the Mystichrome Cobra (see the next section), this same emblem was embroidered in dark charcoal-colored thread to contrast with the special Mystichrome leather inserts. On all 2004 Cobra convertibles, the canvas convertible top was only available in black, regardless of the color and material of the seat inserts.

==== 2004 SVT Cobra base prices ====
All prices below are in United States dollars when the vehicles were sold new at a Ford dealership before any available options were added.

Model	VIN Code	MSRP
Cobra coupe	P48Y	$34,575
Cobra convertible	P49Y	$38,950

=== 2004 Mystichrome Cobra ===
The limited-edition 2004 Mystichrome Cobra debuted at the 2003 New York International Auto Show alongside the 2004 40th Anniversary Mustang GT and V6 models. According to SVT's press release, the Mystichrome Cobra was produced to help commemorate the Mustang's 40th anniversary year. SVT had recognized the importance of this milestone, and shortly after the success of the 1996 Mystic Cobra, SVT worked with Ford's product planners and outside vendors to build the ultimate special edition Cobra. DuPont was commissioned to work on an improved formulation of color-shifting paint that would be easier to use and match. The resulting Mystichrome paint, sold to BASF who finally supplied the paint to Ford, contained ChromaFlair pigments that rendered a shift from a bright topaz green to cobalt blue, then to royal purple, and finally to a deep onyx black. A high amount of metallic aluminum flakes were added to give the Mystichrome paint some sparkle. The paint is called "2004 Ford Mustang Cobra MystiChrome Metallic" and cost, at the time, about $150 per pint. As the Mystichrome paint is still very expensive, any kind of exterior damage to the car is financially problematic. If a damaged Mystichrome Cobra requires repainting at a reputable Ford dealer's body shop, a Ford employee from Dearborn headquarters is required to bring the paint in person and supervise the usage of the special paint. The damaged car must be verified that it is a factory-built Mystichrome Cobra. Once the body shop is finished using the Mystichrome paint, all unused paint must be put back in the can and sealed, and the supervising Ford employee returns to Dearborn with the unused paint.

SVT worked with Garden State Tanning to produce the Mystichrome leather found on the car's seat inserts and the steering wheel at the 10, 2, and 6 o'clock positions. The production process for the Mystichrome leather included tanning and dying the leather jet black, spraying the Mystichrome paint directly onto the leather, and sealing it with a clear layer to protect and prevent damage to the Mystichrome-painted leather. Like the 2003 10th Anniversary Cobra, the Mystichrome Cobra featured a steering wheel with grip humps at the 10 and 2 o'clock positions. The Mystichrome Cobra came standard with five-spoke 17-inch chrome wheels.

The Mystichrome Cobra was produced between December 2003 and January 2004. A total of 1,010 Mystichrome Cobras were produced, 515 coupes and 495 convertibles. The Mystichrome Appearance Package (order code 68M), as it was officially called by Ford, was a $3,650 option.

A definitive history of the Terminator Cobra and John Coletti's SVT operations was captured in the non-fiction book Iron Fist, Lead Foot by Frank Moriarty.

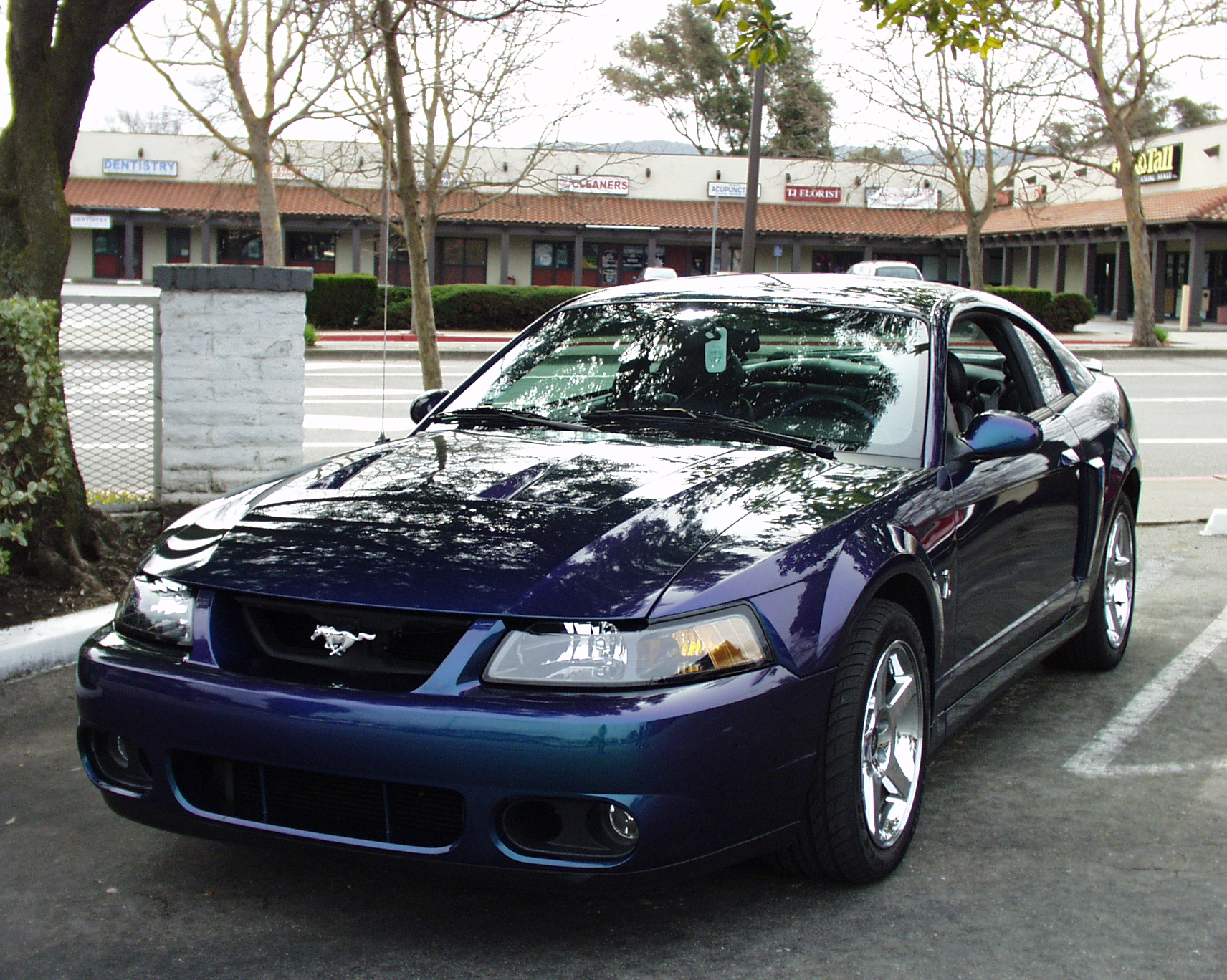
The front of a 2004 Mystichrome Cobra coupe.

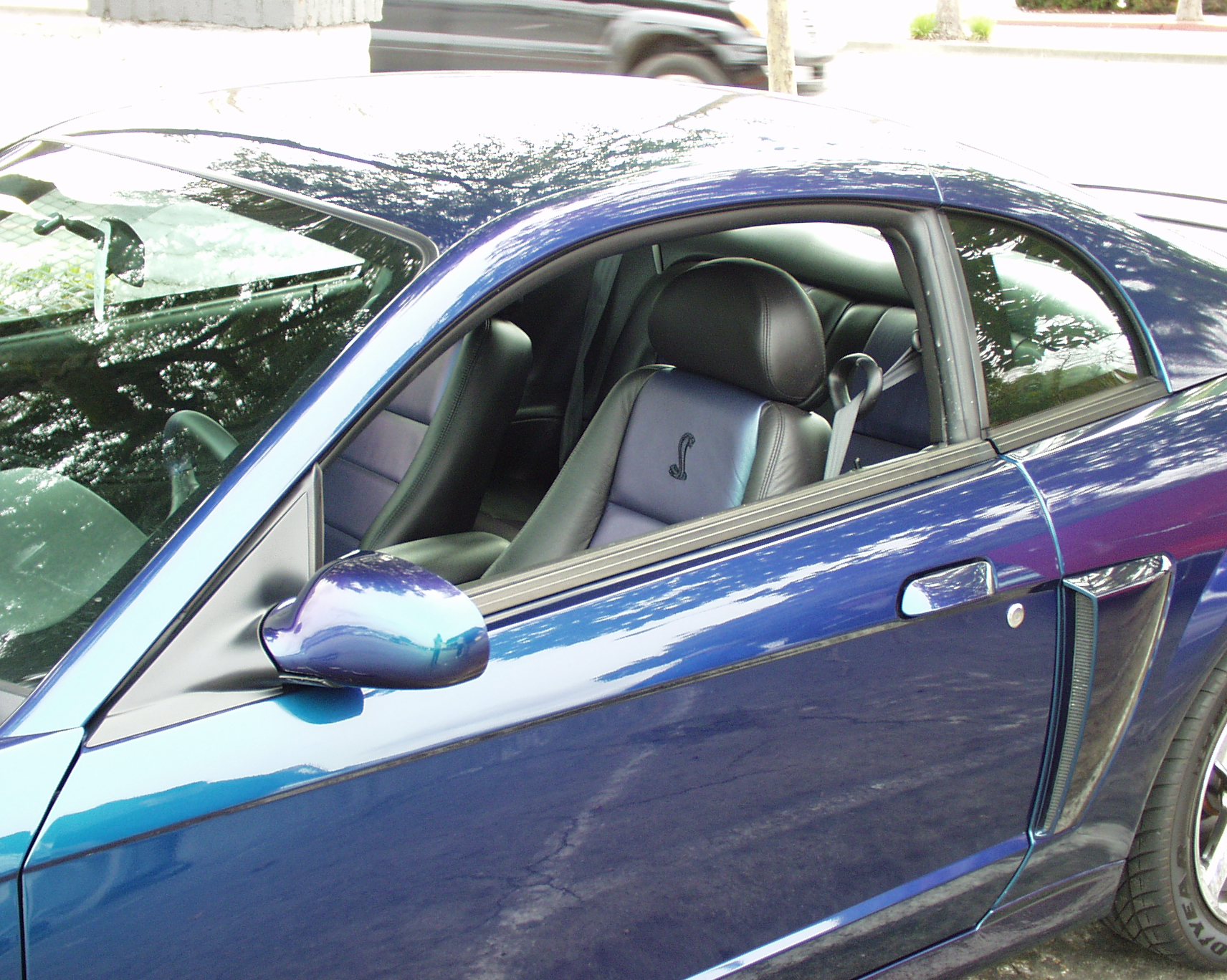
The seats of a 2004 Mystichrome Cobra coupe.

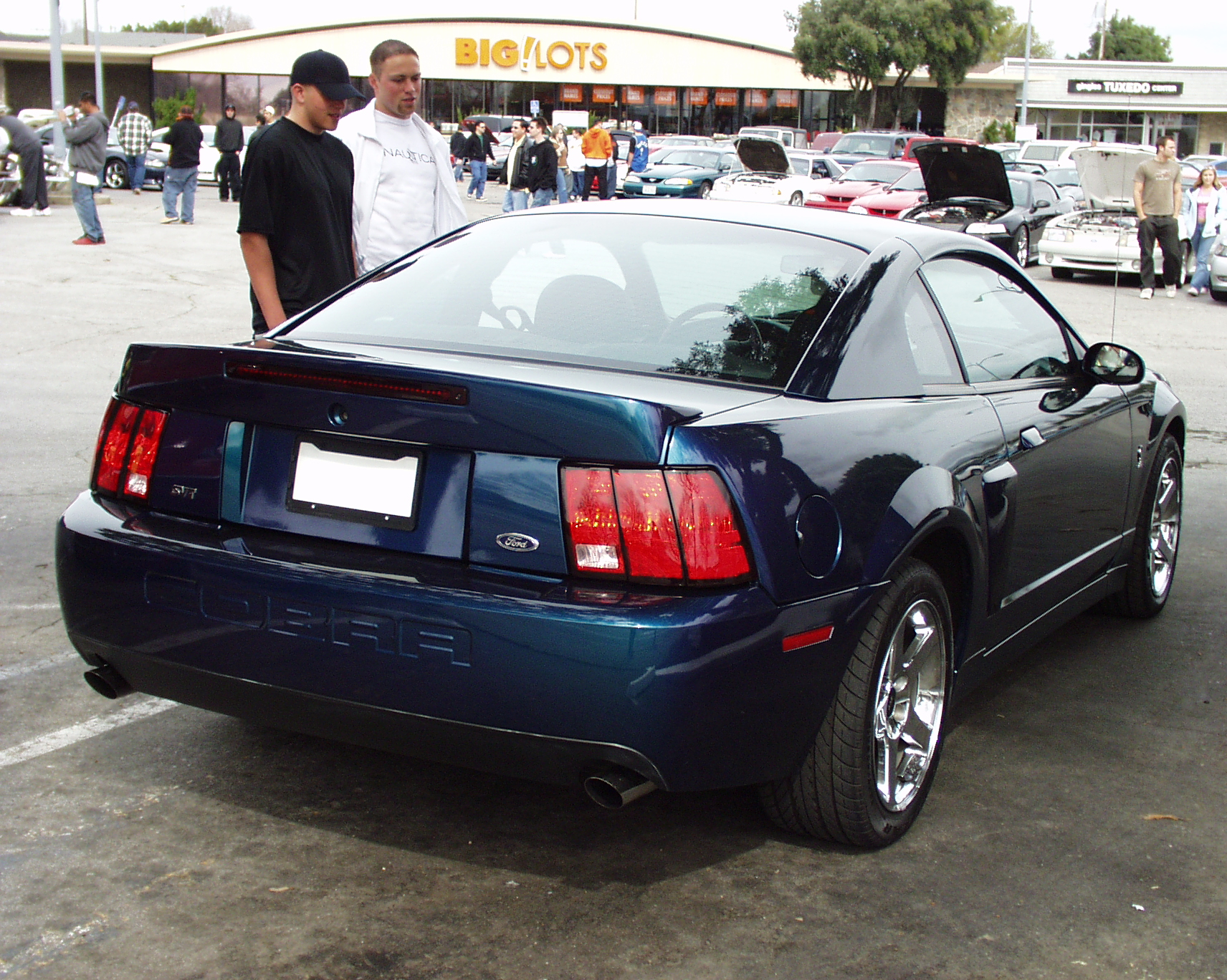
The rear of a 2004 Mystichrome Cobra coupe.

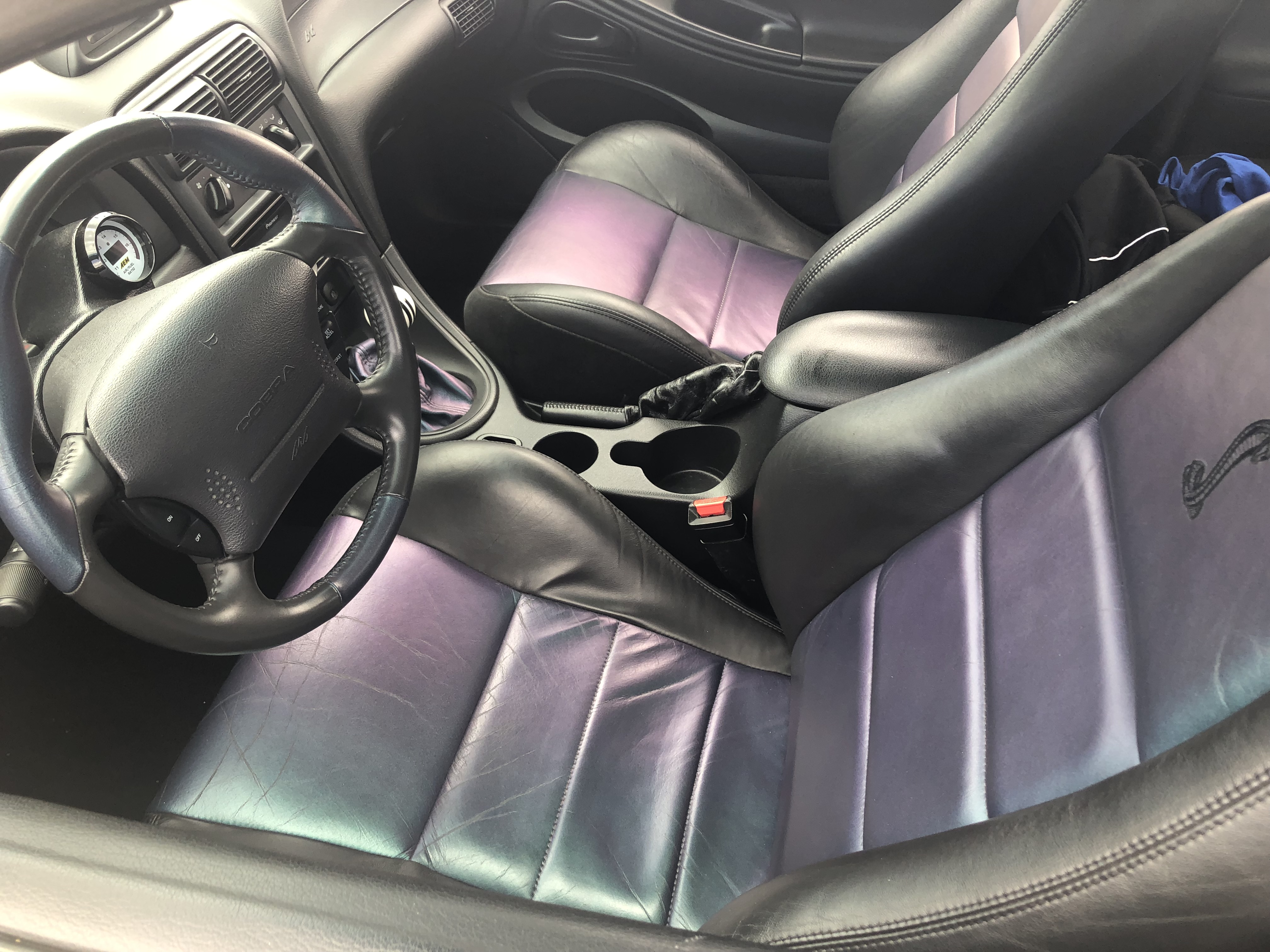
Mystichrome Cobra interior

=== 2004 detailed production numbers ===
==== Cobra Coupe ====
Interior	Oxford White	Ebony	Torch Red	Redfire	Competition Orange	Screaming Yellow	Silver	Mystichrome	Totals
Charcoal suede	196	610	313	318	281	299	324	0	2,341
Graphite suede	120	210	164	191	0	0	227	0	912
Mystichrome leather	0	0	0	0	0	0	0	515	515
TOTALS	316	820	477	509	281	299	551	515	3,768

==== Cobra Convertible ====
Interior	Oxford White	Ebony	Torch Red	Redfire	Competition Orange	Screaming Yellow	Silver	Mystichrome	Totals
Charcoal suede	94	308	132	159	72	167	172	0	1,104
Graphite suede	34	84	35	50	0	0	94	0	297
Mystichrome leather	0	0	0	0	0	0	0	495	495
TOTALS	128	392	167	209	72	167	266	495	1,896

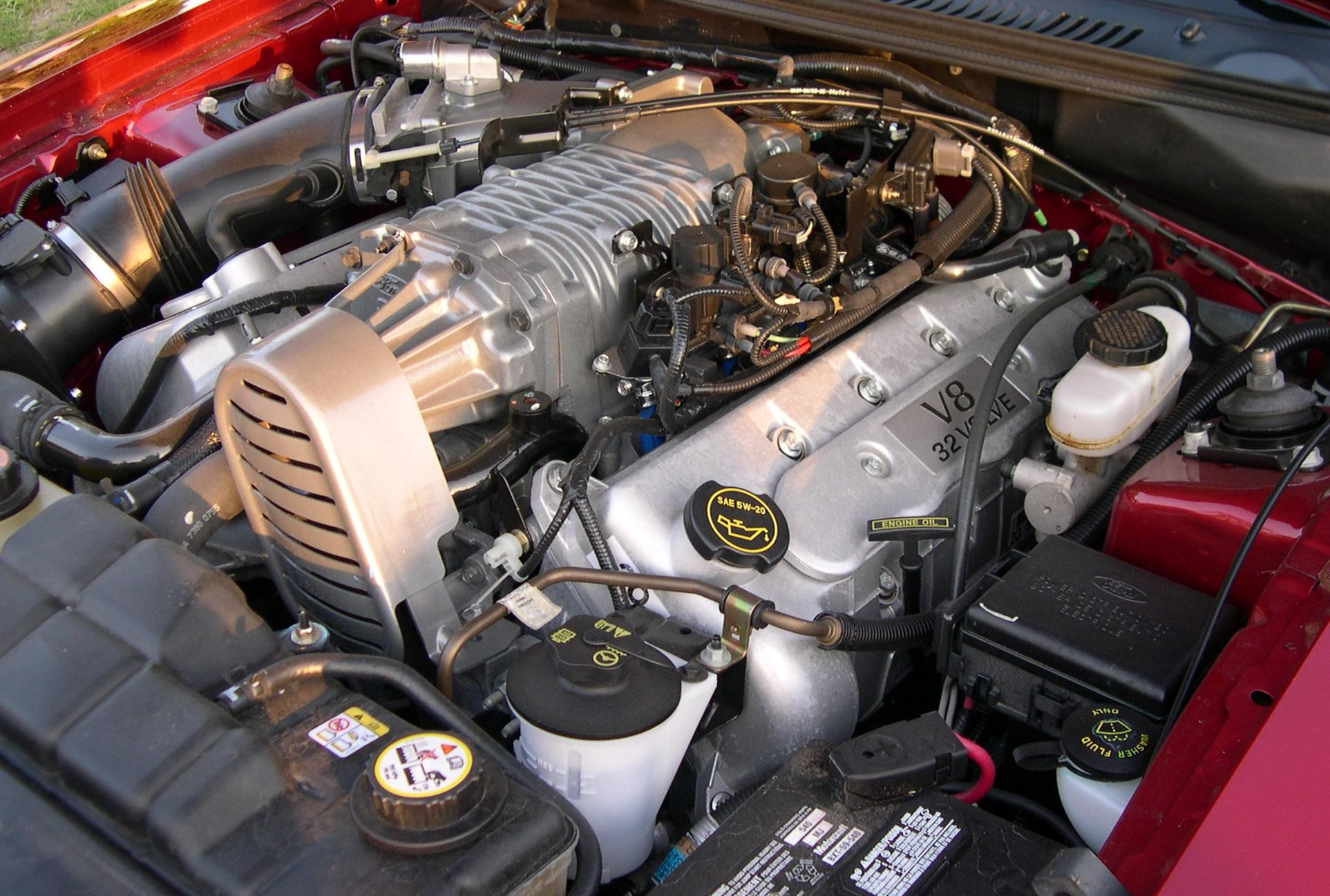
2003–2004 SVT Cobra engine

==== Total 2003–2004 production ====
Year	Model	Production
2003	Cobra Coupe	8,394
2003	Cobra Convertible	5,082
2003	Total	13,476
2004	Cobra Coupe	3,768
2004	Cobra Convertible	1,896
2004	Total	5,664
TOTAL		19,140

== 2027: S650 Based Cobra ==
Ford Racing has announced that the Mustang Cobra nameplate will be returning. The model is expected to feature a high-revving Naturally aspirated V8 and a manual transmission.
