= Tokico =

Japanese automobile parts manufacturer

- Trade name: Tokico
- Native name: トキコ
- Romanized name: Tokiko
- Type: Subsidiary
- Industry: Automotive
- Founded: 1937; 89 years ago
- Headquarters: Kawasaki, Kanagawa, Japan
- Owners: Hitachi Astemo (Tokico Auto Parts); Iwatani Corporation (Tokico System Solutions)

Tokico was a Japanese automobile parts manufacturer. After its acquisition and merger into Hitachi, it is now Hitachi Astemo. It is one of many companies originating from Tokyo Gas Electric Engineering Company.

Tokico Techno, an affiliated company, manufactured and sold measuring instruments for gas stations, fillers for eco-stations, and dispensers, but changed its name to Hitachi Automotive Systems Measurement in 2015. After that, on February 1, 2019, the shares of Hitachi Automotive Systems Measurement were transferred to the investment fund Polaris Capital Group, and the trade name was changed to Tokico System Solutions on September 1.
