= Ford Modular engine =

Engine family by Ford Motor Company

Ford Modular Engine
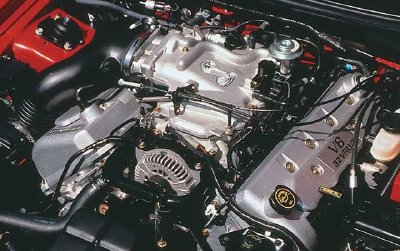
- A 1999 Ford Mustang SVT Cobra engine.

Overview
- Manufacturer: Ford Motor Company
- Also called: Ford Triton; Lincoln InTech
- Production: 1990–present; MY: 1991–present

Layout
- Configuration: 90° V8 and V10
- Displacement: V8; 4.6 L (4,601 cc; 280.8 cu in); 5.0 L (4,951 cc; 302.1 cu in); 5.2 L (5,163 cc; 315.1 cu in); 5.3 L (5,288 cc; 322.7 cu in); 5.4 L (5,408 cc; 330.0 cu in); 5.8 L (5,812 cc; 354.7 cu in); V10; 6.8 L (6,760 cc; 412.5 cu in)
- Cylinder bore: 3.552 in (90.2 mm); 3.629 in (92.2 mm); 3.681 in (93.5 mm); 3.7 in (94 mm)
- Piston stroke: 3.543 in (90.0 mm); 3.649 in (92.7 mm); 3.661 in (93.0 mm); 3.75 in (95.3 mm); 4.165 in (105.8 mm)
- Valvetrain: SOHC 2- or 3 valves per cyl with VCT (some versions); DOHC 4 valves per cyl with VCT/Ti-VCT (some versions)
- Valvetrain drive system: Chain

Combustion
- Supercharger: Eaton M-112 roots-type in DOHC and 5.4 SOHC versions

Output
- Power output: 190–806 hp (142–601 kW)
- Torque output: 260–679 lb⋅ft (353–921 N⋅m)

Chronology
- Predecessor: Ford small block V8; Ford 385 V8

The Ford Modular engine is an overhead camshaft (OHC) V8 and V10 gasoline-powered small block engine family introduced by Ford Motor Company in 1990 for the 1991 model year. The term “modular” applied to the setup of tooling and casting stations in the Windsor and Romeo engine manufacturing plants, not the engine itself.

The Modular engine family started with the 4.6 L in 1990 for the 1991 model year. The Modular engines are used in various Ford, Lincoln, and Mercury vehicles. Modular engines used in Ford trucks were marketed under the Triton name from 1997–2010 while the InTech name was used for a time at Lincoln and Mercury for vehicles equipped with DOHC versions of the engines. The engines were first produced at the Ford Romeo Engine Plant in Romeo, Michigan, then additional capacity was added at the Windsor Engine Plant in Windsor, Ontario.

== Origins ==
In the early 1980s, then-Ford Motor Company chief operating officer Donald Petersen challenged Ford's vice-president of design, Jack Telnack, and his staff to come up with new vehicle designs to replace the boxy styling that had dominated Ford products for years. The result was the adoption of sleeker, more aerodynamic designs like that used for the highly successful Ford Taurus. In the second half of the 1980s, Petersen, then chief executive officer, sought to update Ford's decades-old V8 architectures, challenging Ford senior engineer Jim Clarke to develop a new V8 engine that would surpass Ford's earlier V8s in every meaningful way, from power and efficiency to emissions performance and smoothness of operation.

Clarke and his engineers studied engine designs from major European and Japanese automakers and sought to develop a technologically advanced, power-dense, dependable, low maintenance V8, with no major service required before 100,000 miles (160,000 km) of use.

The initial engine design would implement a 90° vee-angle with a bore and a stroke of 3.552 in × 3.543 in (90.2 mm × 90.0 mm), resulting in a 4.6 L (4,601 cc; 280.8 cu in) displacement and creating a nearly 1:1 bore-to-stroke ratio. This square configuration was chosen primarily for its positive noise, vibration, and harshness characteristics. The engine would utilize features such as a chain-driven, single-overhead camshaft valve train with roller finger followers, a deep-skirt cast-iron block construction and cross-bolted main bearings, all benefiting long-term durability. In the interest of reducing overall engine weight, aluminum-alloy heads would be standard and all major engine accessories would be mounted directly to the block, resulting in a more complex block casting but eliminating the need for heavy mounting brackets. All engines in the family shared a common bore pitch of 3.937 in (100 mm).

Tight construction tolerances were used in shaping cylinder bores to accommodate narrow piston rings. This improved engine efficiency through reduced friction and oil consumption while also promoting cleaner emissions.

Various single- or dual-overhead camshaft eight- and ten-cylinder engines could be produced. Six-cylinder derivatives were also explored, though never built. In order to accommodate the wide array of engine configurations possible within this architecture, Ford developed a new modular tooling system for producing different engines quickly and efficiently in the same factory.

Such an approach allowed for significantly faster changeovers when switching from one engine platform to another among the modular engine family. This also allowed for the existing engine plants, and their supporting offsite production facilities, to handle shorter production runs.

By 1987 Ford was fully committed to producing the new Modular V8, having invested $4 billion (~$9.71 billion in 2025) in the engine's design in addition to retooling the company's Romeo, Michigan tractor plant to build the engines. Three years later, in the third quarter of 1990, the first Modular engine, a 4.6 L SOHC V8, would be used in the 1991 model year Lincoln Town Car. In spite of having a smaller displacement, the 20 lb (9 kg) lighter 4.6 L Modular V8 could generate more power than the Town Car's previous overhead valve 5.0 L (302 cu in) V8 and accelerate to 0–60 mph (0–97 km/h) 1.5 seconds faster, all while delivering better fuel efficiency.

Ford modular engines would go on to become its chief gasoline V8s and V10s.

== 4.6 L ==
The 4.6 L (4,601 cc; 280.8 cu in) displacement 90-degree V8 was offered in 2-valve SOHC, 3-valve SOHC, and 4-valve DOHC versions. The engines were also offered with both aluminum and cast iron blocks, depending on application. The 4.6 L's bore and stroke are nearly square at 3.552 in × 3.543 in (90.2 mm × 90.0 mm), respectively. Deck height for the 4.6 block is 8.937 in (227.0 mm) and connecting rod length is 5.933 in (150.7 mm) center to center, giving the 4.6 L a 1.67:1 rod to stroke ratio. Cylinder bore pitch measures 3.937 in (100 mm), which is common to all variants of the Modular engine family. All Modular V8s, except for the 5.0 L Coyote and 5.2 L Voodoo, utilize the same firing order as the Ford 5.0 L HO and 351 CID (5.8L) V8s (1-3-7-2-6-5-4-8). The 4.6 L engines have been assembled at the Romeo Engine Plant in Michigan, and at the Windsor Engine Plant and the Essex Engine Plant, both located in Windsor, Ontario.

The final 4.6 L engine was produced in May 2014 and installed in a 2014 model year Ford E-Series van.

=== 2-valve ===
The first production Modular engine was the 4.6 L 2-valve SOHC V8 introduced in the 1991 Lincoln Town Car.

The 4.6 L 2V was built at both Romeo Engine Plant and Windsor Engine Plant, which had different designs for cylinder heads (cam caps: interconnected cam "cages" vs. individual caps per cam journal), camshaft sprockets (bolt-on vs. press-on), valve covers (11 bolts vs. 13 bolts), crankshaft (6 bolts vs. 8 bolts) and main bearing caps (2 bolt fasteners with 2 jack screws vs. 2 bolt fasteners with dowel pins).

Vehicles equipped with the 16-valve SOHC 4.6 L include the following:

Vehicle Name	Production Years	Engine Output	Notes
Lincoln Town Car	1991–1993	190 hp (142 kW); 260 lb⋅ft (353 N⋅m)	
Aston Martin Lagonda Vignale concept	1993	190 hp (142 kW); 270 lb⋅ft (366 N⋅m)	
Lincoln Town Car	1994–1995	205 hp (153 kW); 280 lb⋅ft (380 N⋅m)	
Lincoln Town Car	1996–1998	210 hp (157 kW); 280 lb⋅ft (380 N⋅m)	Ford EEC-V Introduced
Lincoln Town Car Touring Sedan	1999–2000	239 hp (178 kW); 282 lb⋅ft (382 N⋅m)	Performance Improved w/standard dual exhaust
Lincoln Town Car	2002–2011	239 hp (178 kW); 282 lb⋅ft (382 N⋅m)	
Ford Crown Victoria; Mercury Grand Marquis	1992–1997	210 hp (157 kW); 270 lb⋅ft (366 N⋅m)	with dual exhaust option Ford EEC-V introduced 1996
Ford Crown Victoria; Mercury Grand Marquis	1998–2000	215 hp (160 kW); 285 lb⋅ft (386 N⋅m)	with dual exhaust option
Ford Crown Victoria; Mercury Grand Marquis	2001–2002	235 hp (175 kW); 275 lb⋅ft (373 N⋅m)	Performance Improved w/dual exhaust option
Ford Crown Victoria; Mercury Grand Marquis	2003–2012	239 hp (178 kW); 282 lb⋅ft (382 N⋅m)	with dual exhaust option
Ford Crown Victoria Police Interceptor	2004–2011	250 hp (186 kW) and 297 lb⋅ft (403 N⋅m)	Mercury Marauder Air Box and 80 mm MAF
Ford Thunderbird; Mercury Cougar	1994–1995	205 hp (153 kW); 265 lb⋅ft (359 N⋅m)	
Ford Thunderbird; Mercury Cougar	1996–1997	205 hp (153 kW); 280 lb⋅ft (380 N⋅m)	Ford EEC-V Introduced
Ford F-Series	1997–2000	220 hp (164 kW) at 4400 rpm 290 lb⋅ft (393 N⋅m) at 3250 rpm	
Ford F-Series	2001–2005	231 hp (172 kW) at 4750 rpm 293 lb⋅ft (397 N⋅m) at 3500 rpm	Performance Improved
Ford F-Series	2006–2010	248 hp (185 kW) at 4750 rpm 294 lb⋅ft (399 N⋅m) at 4000 rpm	
Ford E-Series	1997–2000	210 hp (157 kW); 290 lb⋅ft (393 N⋅m)	
Ford E-Series	2001–2014	231 hp (172 kW); 293 lb⋅ft (397 N⋅m)	Performance Improved
Ford Explorer; Mercury Mountaineer	2002–2005	238 hp (177 kW) at 4750 rpm 282 lb⋅ft (382 N⋅m) at 4000 rpm	
Ford Expedition	1997–2000	215 hp (160 kW); 290 lb⋅ft (393 N⋅m)	
Ford Expedition	2001–2004	231 hp (172 kW); 293 lb⋅ft (397 N⋅m)	Performance Improved
Ford Mustang GT	1996–1997	215 hp (160 kW); 285 lb⋅ft (386 N⋅m)	Ford EEC-V Introduced
Ford Mustang GT	1998	225 hp (168 kW); 290 lb⋅ft (393 N⋅m)	
Ford Mustang GT	1999–2004	260 hp (194 kW); 302 lb⋅ft (409 N⋅m)	Performance Improved heads
Ford Mustang GT Bullitt	2001	265 hp (198 kW); 305 lb⋅ft (414 N⋅m)	Performance Improved heads; alternate intake manifold based on Ford Racing design, unique to this application
MG ZT 260	2003–2005	260 hp (194 kW); 300 lb⋅ft (407 N⋅m)	
Rover 75 V8	2003–2005	260 hp (194 kW); 300 lb⋅ft (407 N⋅m)	
Mobility Ventures MV-1	2011–2014	248 hp (185 kW); 294 lb⋅ft (399 N⋅m)	also available in factory CNG version

=== 3-valve ===
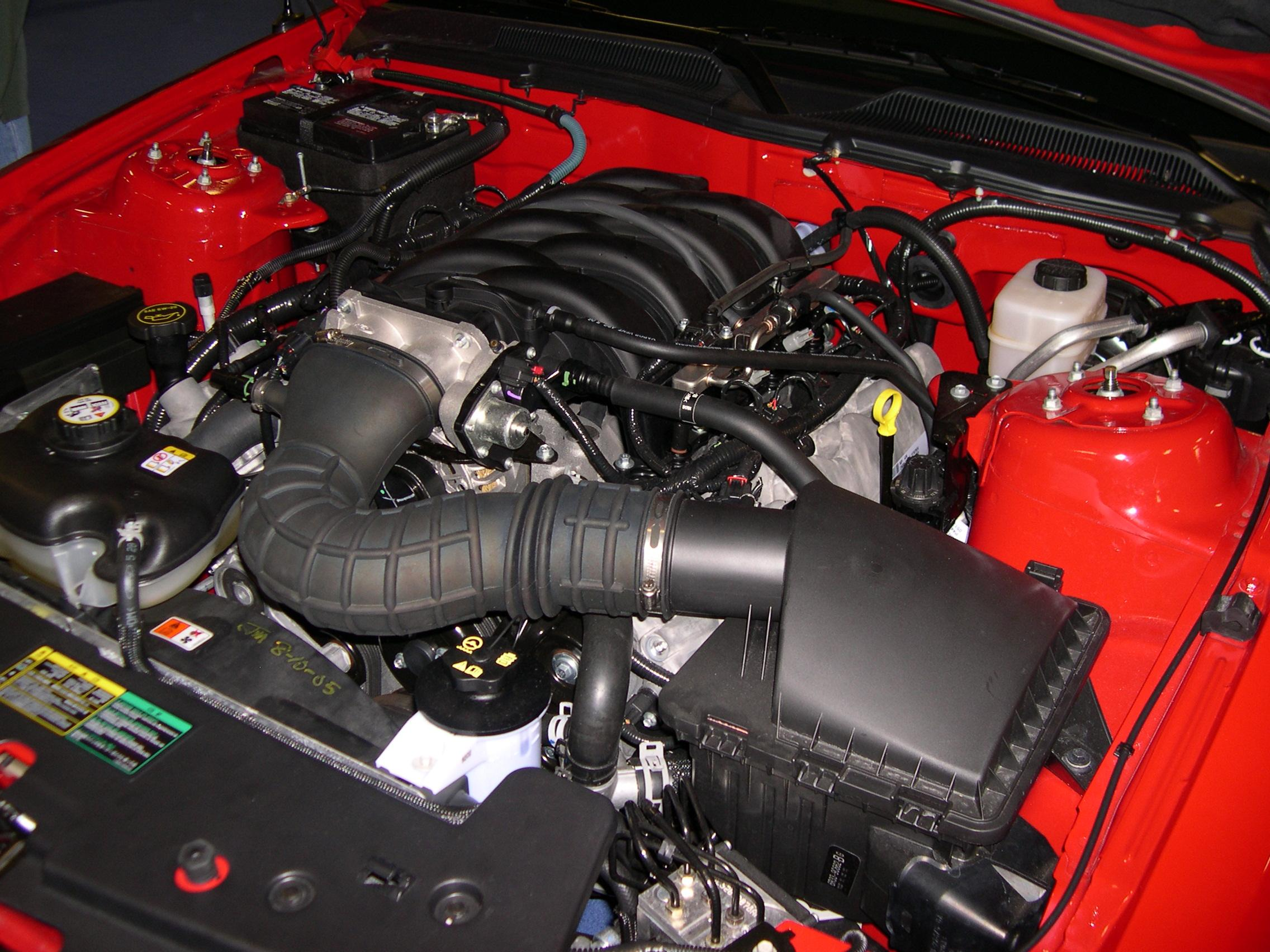
4.6 L 3-valve SOHC V8 installed in a 2006 Ford Mustang GT

The 3-valve SOHC 4.6 L with variable camshaft timing (VCT) first appeared in the redesigned 2005 Ford Mustang.

The engines are equipped with an electronic Charge Motion Control Valve (CMCV) system that provides increased air velocity at low engine speeds for improved emissions and low-rpm torque. Cylinder block material varies between aluminum used in the 2005-10 Mustang GT and cast iron used in the truck applications.

The 3-valve SOHC 4.6 L engine was on the Ward's 10 Best Engines list for 2005–2008.

Vehicles equipped with the 24-valve SOHC VCT 4.6 L include the following:

Vehicle Name	Production Years	Engine Output	Notes
Ford Mustang GT	2005–2009	300 hp (224 kW); 320 lb⋅ft (434 N⋅m)	
Ford Mustang Bullitt	2008–2009	315 hp (235 kW); 325 lb⋅ft (441 N⋅m)	
Ford Mustang GT	2010	315 hp (235 kW); 325 lb⋅ft (441 N⋅m)	
Ford Explorer; Mercury Mountaineer	2006–2010	292 hp (218 kW); 315 lb⋅ft (427 N⋅m)	
Ford Explorer Sport Trac	2006–2010	292 hp (218 kW); 315 lb⋅ft (427 N⋅m)	
Ford F-150	2009–2010	292 hp (218 kW); 320 lb⋅ft (434 N⋅m)	

=== 4-valve ===
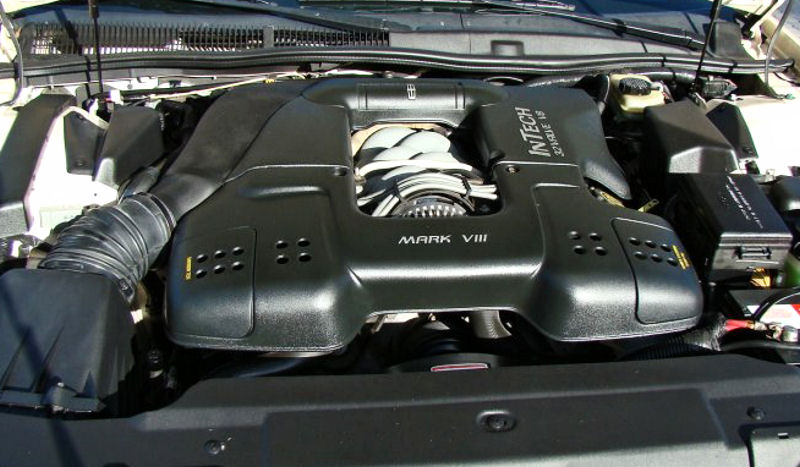
4.6 L 4-valve DOHC InTech V8 installed in a 1996 Lincoln Mark VIII

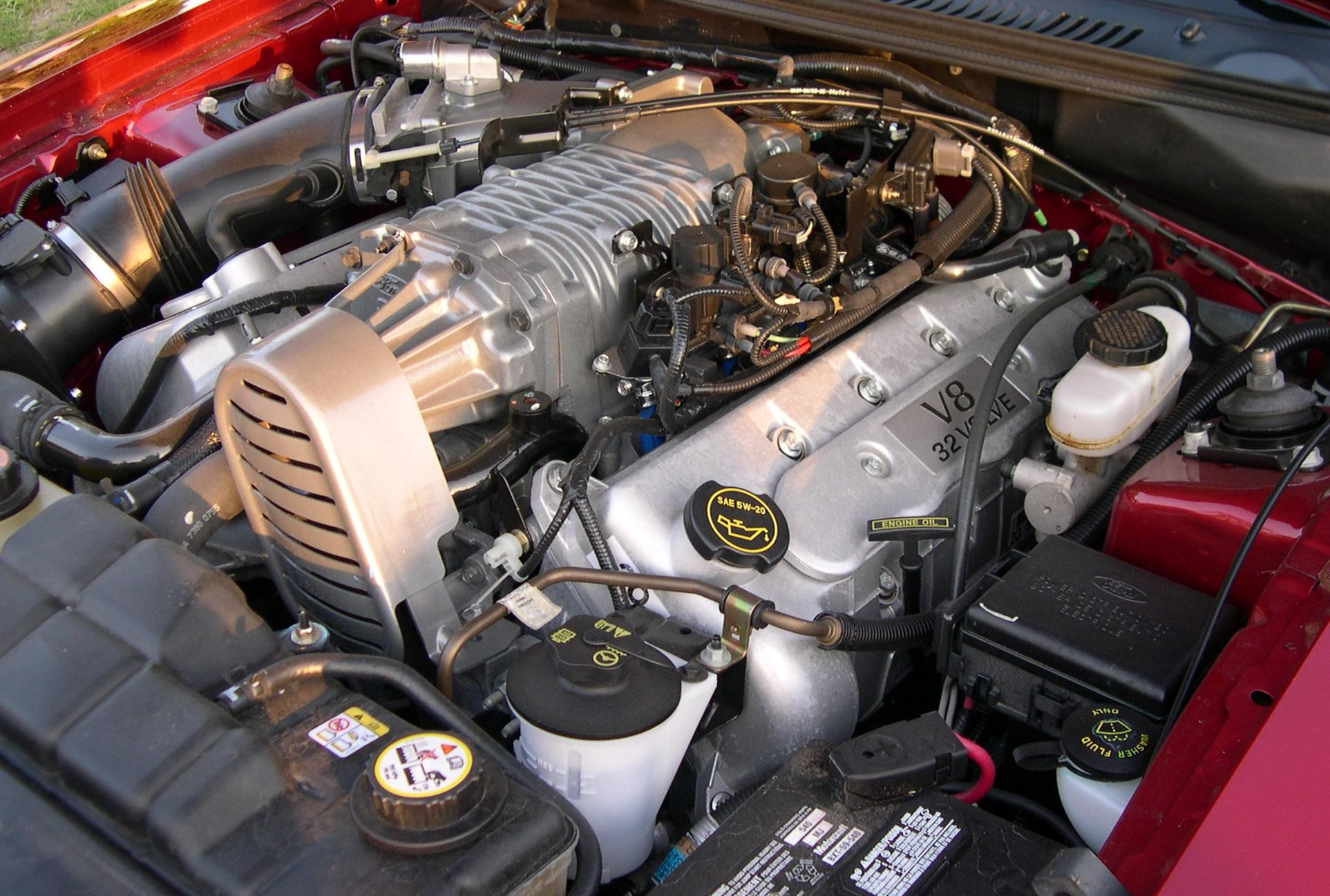
4.6 L 4-valve DOHC supercharged V8 installed in a 2003 and 2004 Ford Mustang SVT Cobra

The 4-valve DOHC version of the Modular engine was introduced in the 1993 Lincoln Mark VIII as the 4.6 L Four-Cam V8. Lincoln marketed the engine under the name InTech after 1995.

The 1993–1998 4-valve engines featured cylinder heads with two intake ports per cylinder (split-port) and variable runner length intake manifolds with either vacuum or electrically activated intake manifold runner controls (IMRC) depending on application. The engine was revised for 1999 with new cylinder heads featuring tumble-style intake ports (one intake port feeding two intake valves), new camshaft profiles, and fixed runner-length intake manifolds. These changes resulted in more power, torque and a broader power-band when compared to the earlier 4-valve engines.

All 4.6 L 4-valve engines featured aluminum engine blocks with 6-bolt main bearing caps, the only exception being the 2003–2004 SVT Cobra which had a 4-bolt main cast iron block. The 1999 and earlier engines featured an aluminum block cast in Italy by Fiat subsidiary Teksid S.p.A. Since 1996, all of the 4.6 L 4-valve engines manufactured for use in the SVT Cobra have been hand-built by SVT technicians at Ford's Romeo, Michigan plant.

The 4-valve DOHC 4.6 L engine was on the Ward's 10 Best Engines list for 1996 and 1997.

Vehicles equipped with the 32-valve DOHC 4.6 L include the following:

Vehicle Name	Production Years	Engine Output	Notes
Lincoln Mark VIII	1993–1998	280 hp (209 kW); 285 lb⋅ft (386 N⋅m)	
Lincoln Mark VIII LSC	1995–1998	290 hp (216 kW); 295 lb⋅ft (400 N⋅m)	
Ford Thunderbird SVE	1996–1997	350 hp (261 kW); 375 lb⋅ft (508 N⋅m)	Supercharged, never progressed past prototype phase
Lincoln Continental	1995–1998	260 hp (194 kW); 265 lb⋅ft (359 N⋅m)	FWD, different bellhousing
Lincoln Continental	1999–2002	275 hp (205 kW); 275 lb⋅ft (373 N⋅m)	FWD, different bellhousing
Lincoln Aviator	2003–2005	302 hp (225 kW); 300 lb⋅ft (407 N⋅m)	
Mercury Marauder	2003–2004	302 hp (225 kW); 318 lb⋅ft (431 N⋅m)	
Ford Mustang SVT Cobra	1996–1998	305 hp (227 kW); 300 lb⋅ft (407 N⋅m)	
Ford Mustang SVT Cobra	1999, 2001	320 hp (239 kW); 317 lb⋅ft (430 N⋅m)	
Ford Mustang SVT Cobra	2003–2004	390 hp (291 kW); 390 lb⋅ft (529 N⋅m)	Iron block, supercharged
Ford Mustang Mach 1	2003	305 hp (227 kW); 320 lb⋅ft (434 N⋅m)	
Ford Mustang Mach 1	2004	310 hp (231 kW); 335 lb⋅ft (454 N⋅m)	
De Tomaso Guarà	1998–2004	305 PS (224 kW; 301 hp); 299 lb⋅ft (406 N⋅m)	
Spectre R42	1995–1998	350 hp (261 kW); 317 lb⋅ft (430 N⋅m)	
Marcos Mantis	1997–1999	327 hp (244 kW); 317 lb⋅ft (430 N⋅m)	
Marcos Mantis GT	1998–1999	506 hp (377 kW); 452 lb⋅ft (613 N⋅m)	Supercharged
Panoz AIV Roadster	1997–1999	305 hp (227 kW); 300 lb⋅ft (407 N⋅m)	
Panoz Esperante	2000–2009	305 hp (227 kW); 300 lb⋅ft (407 N⋅m)	
Qvale Mangusta	2000–2001	320 hp (239 kW); 317 lb⋅ft (430 N⋅m)	
MG X-Power SV	2003–2005	320 hp (239 kW); 317 lb⋅ft (430 N⋅m)	
Invicta S1	2004–2012	320 hp (239 kW); 317 lb⋅ft (430 N⋅m)	

== 5.0 L Coyote ==
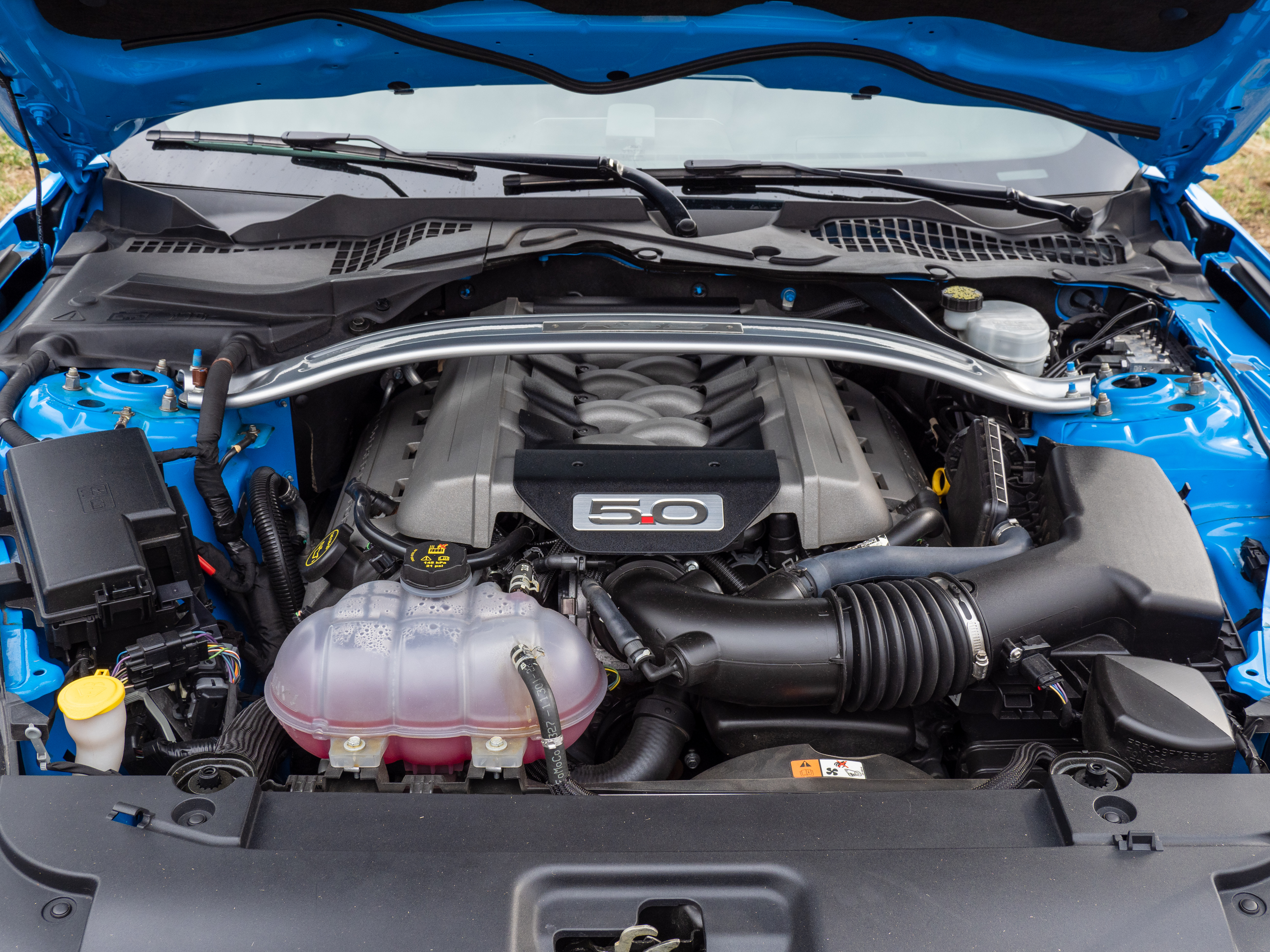
5.0 L Coyote in a Ford Mustang GT

The 5.0 L (4,951 cc; 302.1 cu in) Coyote V8 was first produced in 2010 for the 2011 model year. It was an evolutionary development of Ford's Modular V8, and is assembled in Ford's Essex Engine Plant in Windsor, Ontario, using existing Modular tooling.

Ford engineers needed to design a V8, specifically for the Mustang GT, that would compete with the GM 6.2 L LS3 used in the new Chevrolet Camaro, and the new Chrysler 6.4 L HEMI in the Dodge Charger, Dodge Challenger, Chrysler 300 and Jeep Grand Cherokee. Since this engine replaced the already popular 4.6 L and 5.4 L Modular Engines, this engine had to remain close to the same physical size of the outgoing 4.6 L, and share other specifications with it such as bore pitch, deck height, bell housing bolt pattern, etc. in order for the engine to utilize existing modular production line tooling. The result was the 5.0 L Coyote, which produced roughly the same amount of power as its competitors, but with a much smaller displacement.

It shares the 4.6 L's bore pitch of 3.937 in (100 mm) and 8.937 in (227.0 mm) deck height, while bore diameter and stroke have increased to 92.2 mm × 92.7 mm (3.63 in × 3.65 in), respectively. The engine also retains the 4.6 L's 5.933 in (150.7 mm) connecting rod length, which produces a 1.62:1 rod to stroke ratio. The firing order has been changed from that shared by all previous Modular V8s (1-3-7-2-6-5-4-8) to that of the Ford Flathead V8 (1-5-4-8-6-3-7-2). Compression ratio is 11.0:1, and despite having port fuel injection (as opposed to direct injection) the engine can still be run on 87 octane gasoline.

The Coyote features all new 4 valve DOHC cylinder heads that have shifted the camshafts outboard, which allowed for a compact roller finger follower setup with remote hydraulic valve lash adjusters and improved (raised) intake port geometry. The result is an intake port that outflows the Ford GT intake port by 4 percent and the Yates D3 (NASCAR) intake port up to 0.472 in (12.0 mm) lift, which is the maximum lift of the Coyote's intake cams. Engine redline is 7000 rpm.

The Coyote is Ford's first implementation of its cam-torque-actuated (CTA) Twin Independent Variable Cam Timing (Ti-VCT) in a V8 engine, which allows the powertrain control module (PCM) to advance and retard intake and exhaust cam timing independently of each other, providing improved power, fuel economy and reduced emissions.

To strengthen the block enough to handle increased output, webbing was extensively used as reinforcement in the casting, rather than increasing the thickness of the walls. The intake plenum was also situated low between the two cylinder banks to meet the height constraint, thus the alternator traditionally placed low and center was moved to the side of the engine.

The Coyote made Ward's 10 Best Engines list for 2011, 2012, and 2018.

=== Boss 302 (Road Runner) variant ===
A higher performance variant of the Coyote, dubbed Road Runner internally by Ford, is produced under the Boss 302 moniker used for the resurrected Boss 302 Mustang for the 2012 model year. The Boss 302 receives CNC ported heads cast in 356 aluminum providing additional airflow and strength, and a higher lift exhaust camshaft profile is used. Valvetrain components were lightened as much as possible, including the use of sodium filled exhaust valves, while strengthened powdered metal rods and forged aluminum pistons were added. Piston-cooling jets were also deleted, which are standard in the 5.0 model. Exterior changes include a high-mount intake plenum (as opposed to the standard engine's low-mounted one) with shorter runners to improve high-rpm power. Power is increased from 412 hp (307 kW) to 444 hp (331 kW), and torque drops from 390 lb⋅ft (529 N⋅m) to 380 lb⋅ft (515 N⋅m) due to the upgrades. The Boss's redline is increased to 7500 rpm, but has been verified stable up to 8400.

=== Gen 3 update ===
For 2018, Ford made revisions to the Coyote equipped in the Mustang GT, most notably the addition of high-pressure direct injection (in addition to the existing port injection system), and an increase of the piston bore diameter from 92.2 to 93 mm (3.63 to 3.66 in). This increase in the bore size, resulting from the adoption of Plasma Wire Arc Transfer cylinder liner technology in place of the more traditional sleeve in the block, brings total displacement up from 4,951 to 5,035 cc (302 to 307 cu in). Other changes include Gen. 3 specific camshafts, enlarged intake and exhaust valves, an increased compression ratio of 12.0:1, a revised intake manifold, and 7500 rpm redline in the Mustang. With these changes the updated 5.0 L Coyote is rated by Ford at 460 hp (343 kW) and 420 lb⋅ft (569 N⋅m). The 2019–2020 Bullitt and 2021–2023 Mach 1 models received an uprated version of the Coyote rated at 480 hp (358 kW) and 420 lb⋅ft (569 N⋅m). The 20 hp (15 kW) improvement was due to an intake manifold and 87 mm throttle body borrowed from the 5.2 L Voodoo engine as well as a recalibrated powertrain control module.

=== Gen 4 update ===
In 2023, for the 2024 model year, the Mustang debuted with the 4th generation of the Coyote engine. It produces 480 hp (358 kW) and 415 lb⋅ft (563 N⋅m) in the GT trim level, 486 hp (362 kW) and 418 lb⋅ft (567 N⋅m) with the Active Performance Exhaust option, and 500 hp (373 kW) and 418 lb⋅ft (567 N⋅m) in the Dark Horse trim level. Updates include:

- Revised 4 into 1 exhaust manifold
- Intake manifold with dual 80 mm throttle bodies

The Dark Horse also received:

- Revised camshafts
- Forged piston rods from the 5.2 L Predator engine

=== F-150 variant ===
A torque-biased variant of the Coyote is produced as an alternative to the EcoBoost V6 in the F-150 pickup truck. The F-150 5.0 L receives a lower compression ratio (10.5:1), intake camshafts with less duration, cast iron exhaust manifolds, and revised cylinder heads to improve cooling. The intake manifold changed only in color, and height. These changes promote low-end and mid-range power and torque. The engine retains the Coyote's forged steel crank and piston-cooling jets but benefits from the addition of an external engine oil cooler similar to the Boss 302's. The changes result in the engine's peak horsepower dropping to 360 hp (268 kW; 365 PS) at 5500 rpm, while torque is rated at 380 lb⋅ft (520 N⋅m) at 4250 rpm. When the 2015 F-150 was revealed, Ford improved the induction system to pull air from above the grille under the hood (aka Ram Air Effect) as opposed to the fender intake inlet that had been used for all previous Ford Modular Engines. The addition of Ram Air Effect pulled more cool air into the engine in favor for a power increase to 385 hp (287 kW; 390 PS) at 5750 rpm and 387 lb⋅ft (525 N⋅m) at 3850 rpm.

For 2018, numerous revisions were made to the 5.0. Most notably, the adoption of a port and direct fuel injection system, as well as spray-on bore liner, eliminating the need for conventional cast iron cylinder bore liners (changes shared with the 2018 Mustang), and compression ratio is increased to 12.0:1. Power increased to 395 hp (295 kW; 400 PS) at 5750 rpm, while torque is rated at 400 lb⋅ft (540 N⋅m) at 4500 rpm.

=== Miami variant ===
The Miami was a supercharged variant designed by FPV (a joint -venture by Ford Australia and Prodrive) while the Coyote was still in development. Pre-production engines were shipped to Australia, where they were fitted with Australian-developed superchargers. The blocks and crank were common with the US Coyote engine but the sump, rods, pistons, intake manifold, supercharger, exhaust manifolds, wiring loom and engine control unit were designed and manufactured in Australia. The US Coyote engine had VVT on all 4 cams but the Australian ECU only had enough outputs to control 2 cams, so only the intake cams have VVT. The supercharger uses Eaton rotors in a housing designed by Australian company Harrop Engineering – the same company that provides superchargers to Roush Performance.

Initial variants made 422 hp (315 kW), 402 lbf⋅ft (545 N⋅m) and 449 hp (335 kW), 420 lbf⋅ft (570 N⋅m). Later versions made 463 hp (345 kW), 471 hp (351 kW) and ultimately 648 hp (483 kW) (with the addition of an intercooler).

The Miami variant was sold in the Australian Ford Falcon-based GT range and the FGX XR8. The 648 hp (483 kW) version was sold in the Premcar Holy Grail.

=== Applications ===
The engine is gradually replacing the 4.6 L and 5.4 L Modular V8 units in all Ford vehicles. This is the first time that Ford has used the "5.0" designation since the pushrod 5.0 was discontinued and replaced by the 4.6 L Modular unit in the mid-90s.

Vehicles equipped with the 32-valve DOHC Ti-VCT 5.0 L include the following:

Vehicle Name	Production Years	Engine Output	Notes
Ford Mustang GT	2011–2012	412 hp (307 kW) at 6500 rpm 390 lb⋅ft (529 N⋅m) at 4250 rpm	
Ford Mustang Boss 302	2012–2013	444 hp (331 kW) at 7500 rpm 380 lb⋅ft (515 N⋅m) at 4500 rpm	"Road Runner" - Upgraded crank, rods, pistons, heads, intake manifold, and camshafts, redline increased to 7500 rpm
Ford Mustang GT	2013–2014	420 hp (313 kW) at 6500 rpm 390 lb⋅ft (529 N⋅m) at 4250 rpm	Removed piston oil squirters, recalibrated PCM
Ford Mustang GT	2015–2017	435 hp (324 kW) at 6500 rpm 400 lb⋅ft (542 N⋅m) at 4250 rpm	"Gen II" - Revised heads, valvetrain and piston rods from Boss 302, higher lift camshafts, intake manifold with CMC valves
Ford Mustang GT	2018–2023	460 hp (343 kW) at 7,000 rpm 420 lb⋅ft (569 N⋅m) at 4,600 rpm	"Gen III" - Direct and port fuel injection, increased compression from 11:1 to 12:1, bore increased from 92.2 to 93 mm (3.63 to 3.66 in), revised heads, 7500 rpm redline
Ford Mustang Bullitt	2019–2020	480 hp (358 kW) at 7,000 rpm 420 lb⋅ft (569 N⋅m) at 4,600 rpm	Larger 87 mm throttle body, modified GT350 manifold and cold air intake with PCM recalibration
Ford Mustang Mach 1	2021–2023	480 hp (358 kW) at 7,000 rpm 420 lb⋅ft (569 N⋅m) at 4,600 rpm	Larger 87 mm throttle body, modified GT350 manifold and cold air intake with PCM recalibration
Ford Mustang GT	2024–present	480 hp (358 kW) at 7,250 rpm 415 lb⋅ft (563 N⋅m) at 4,900 rpm	"Gen IV" - Higher-lift camshafts, dual 80 mm throttle bodies, dual airbox intake system, 486 hp (362 kW) with Active Exhaust
Ford Mustang Dark Horse	2024–present	500 hp (373 kW) at 7,250 rpm 418 lb⋅ft (567 N⋅m) at 4,900 rpm	Re-balanced crankshaft, forged connecting rods (from 5.2 L Predator), strengthened camshafts
Ford F-150	2011–2014	360 hp (268 kW) at 5500 rpm 380 lb⋅ft (515 N⋅m) at 4250 rpm	
Ford F-150	2015–2017	385 hp (287 kW) at 5750 rpm 387 lb⋅ft (525 N⋅m) at 3850 rpm	
Ford F-150	2018–2020	395 hp (295 kW) at 5750 rpm 400 lb⋅ft (542 N⋅m) at 4500 rpm	Direct injection and port fuel injection. Increased compression from 10.5:1 to 12:1. Bore increased from 92.2 to 93 mm (3.63 to 3.66 in)
Ford F-150	2021–present	400 hp (298 kW) at 6000 rpm 410 lb⋅ft (556 N⋅m) at 4250 rpm	
Ford Falcon GT	2011–2014	449 hp (335 kW) at 5750 rpm 420 lb⋅ft (570 N⋅m) at 2200–5500 rpm	Supercharged
Ford Falcon XR8	2014–2016	449 hp (335 kW) at 5750 rpm 420 lb⋅ft (570 N⋅m) at 2200–5500 rpm	Supercharged; Peak output of 375 kW (503 hp) with overboost
FPV Ford Falcon GT-F	2014	471 hp (351 kW) at 5750 rpm [542 hp (404 kW) with overboost 420 lb⋅ft (570 N⋅m) at 2200–5500 rpm	Supercharged
TVR Griffith	2020	500 hp (373 kW); 430 lb⋅ft (583 N⋅m)	Tuned by Cosworth
Panoz Esperante	2014–2015	450 hp (336 kW); 570 N⋅m (420 lb⋅ft)	
BXR Bailey Blade	2015	750 hp (559 kW); 570 lb⋅ft (773 N⋅m)	Twin-turbocharged
Puritalia Berlinetta	2019–present	750 hp (559 kW); 848 N⋅m (625 lb⋅ft)	Hybrid with 215 hp (160 kW) and 370 N⋅m (273 lb⋅ft) YASA electric motor
De Tomaso P72	2023–present	750 hp (559 kW); 900 N⋅m (664 lb⋅ft)	Supercharged

The Coyote is available as a crate motor from Ford Racing Performance Parts (FRPP) complete with alternator, manifold, and wiring harness in standard 412 bhp (307 kW; 418 PS) configuration. The Boss 302 is also available from FRPP for a premium over the standard 5.0 L.

== 5.2 L ==
=== Voodoo ===
The 5.2 L (5,163 cc; 315.1 cu in) "Voodoo" is a development of the Coyote engine. The engine was developed specifically for the Shelby GT350 version of the sixth generation Mustang. Bore and stroke are both up from the 5.0 L Coyote at 94 mm × 93 mm (3.70 in × 3.66 in), as is the compression ratio at 12.0:1. The Voodoo makes 526 hp (392 kW) at 7500 rpm and 429 lb⋅ft (582 N⋅m) of torque at 4750 rpm and has a redline of 8250 rpm. In 2016, the engine received a Ward's 10 Best Engines award. Like other modern Ford Performance Mustang engines, the Voodoo is hand-built at Ford's Romeo Plant on the Niche Line.

Unlike the Coyote and previous Modular V8s, the Voodoo features a flat plane crankshaft. During development, Ford purchased a Ferrari California, the only other front-engine flat-plane crank V8 car in production at the time, as a benchmark. The Voodoo features a unique Up-Down-Up-Down crank pin configuration, as opposed to the typical Up-Down-Down-Up in inline-4s and other flat-plane V8s. Due to the unique crankpin configuration, the back-to-front firing order of 1-5-4-8-3-7-2-6, is also unique to the Voodoo. This engine was the biggest production flat plane crank V8 by displacement until General Motors introduced the LT6.

The GT350R variant of the engine received a number of valvetrain enhancements, including the timing chains, lash adjusters, and VCT mechanisms.

Vehicles equipped with the 32-valve DOHC 5.2 L include the following:

Vehicle Name	Production Years	Engine Output
Ford Mustang Shelby GT350/350R	2015–2020	526 hp (392 kW) at 7500 rpm 429 lb⋅ft (582 N⋅m) at 4750 rpm

=== Aluminator 5.2 XS ===
The Aluminator 5.2 XS is another variant of the Coyote engine utilizing the 5.2 L cylinder block from the GT350. The Aluminator is differentiated from the Voodoo engine by a Cobra Jet intake manifold and throttle body and a cross-plane crankshaft. The engine has a claimed output of 580 hp (433 kW) and 445 lb⋅ft (603 N⋅m). Like the "Voodoo" engine, it also features a 12:1 compression ratio and 5.2 L (5,163 cc; 315.1 cu in) of displacement.

This engine is sold as a Ford Performance Parts crate engine without a wiring harness, a flywheel, or headers.

=== Predator ===
The "Predator" is a 5.2 L (5,163 cc; 315.1 cu in) variant of the "Coyote" engine utilizing a cross-plane crank and a supercharger, installed in the Mustang Shelby GT500 starting in 2020. The engine has an output of 760 hp (570 kW; 770 PS) and 625 lb⋅ft (847 N⋅m) of torque. Production ended on October 18, 2022, marking the end of the Shelby GT500. This was also the last engine to be produced on the Romeo Engine Plant Niche line.

=== Carnivore ===
Based on the Predator engine, the engine used in the 2023 F-150 Raptor R is tuned for more low-end torque by using a different supercharger pulley and a new calibration. It is produced on a new Niche Engine line at the Dearborn Engine Plant.

== 5.4 L ==
The 5.4 L (5,409 cc; 330.1 cu in) V8 is a member of the Modular engine family first introduced in the 1997 F-series pick-ups, in place of the 5.8 L 351W. Bore diameter is 3.552 in (90.2 mm) and stroke is 4.165 in (105.8 mm), the increased stroke necessitated a taller 10.079 in (256.0 mm) engine block deck height. A 6.658 in (169.1 mm) connecting rod length is used to achieve a 1.60:1 rod to stroke ratio. The 5.4 L 2V was built at the Windsor Engine Plant, while the 5.4 L 3V moved production to the Essex Engine Plant beginning in 2003, then back to Windsor Engine Plant in 2009. The SVT 5.4 L 4-valve engines are built at Romeo Engine Plant, hand assembled on the niche line.

=== 2-valve ===
Introduced in 1997, the SOHC 2-valve 5.4 L has a cast iron engine block and aluminum cylinder heads. The 5.4 L features multi-port fuel injection, roller finger followers, fracture-split powder metal connecting rods, and in some applications a forged steel crankshaft.

The 2-valve SOHC 5.4 L engine was on the Ward's 10 Best Engines list for 1997–1998 and 2000–2002.

Vehicles equipped with the 16-valve SOHC 5.4 L include the following:

Vehicle Name	Production Years	Engine Output	Notes
Ford F-Series	1997–1998	235 hp (175 kW); 330 lb⋅ft (447 N⋅m)	
Ford F-Series	1999–2004	260 hp (194 kW); 350 lb⋅ft (475 N⋅m)	Performance Improved
Ford SVT Lightning	1999–2004	380 hp (283 kW); 450 lb⋅ft (610 N⋅m)	Supercharged ratings for 2001 and later model years
Ford F-150 Harley Davidson Edition	2002–2003	340 hp (254 kW) at 4500 rpm 425 lb⋅ft (576 N⋅m) at 3250 rpm	Supercharged and Intercooled
Ford Expedition; Lincoln Navigator	1997–1998	235 hp (175 kW); 330 lb⋅ft (447 N⋅m)	
Ford Expedition	1999–2004	260 hp (194 kW); 350 lb⋅ft (475 N⋅m)	Performance Improved
Ford Excursion	2000–2005	260 hp (194 kW); 350 lb⋅ft (475 N⋅m)	
Ford Econoline	1997–1998	235 hp (175 kW); 330 lb⋅ft (447 N⋅m)	
Ford E-Series	1999–2017	260 hp (194 kW); 350 lb⋅ft (475 N⋅m)	Performance Improved

=== 3-valve ===
In 2002, Ford introduced a new 3-valve SOHC cylinder head with variable camshaft timing (VCT), improving power and torque over the previous 2-valve SOHC version. The 3-valve cylinder head was first used on the 2002 Ford Fairmont 5.4 L Barra 220 engine in Australia manufactured in Windsor, Ontario, Canada. The 3-valve 5.4 L was introduced to the North American market in the redesigned 2004 Ford F-150.

Vehicles equipped with the 24-valve SOHC VCT 5.4 L include the following:

Vehicle Name	Production Years	Engine Output	Notes
Ford Falcon/Futura/Fairmont/Fairmont Ghia	2002–2005	295 hp (220 kW); 347 lb⋅ft (470 N⋅m)	
Ford Fairlane G220; Ford LTD	2003–2004	295 hp (220 kW); 347 lb⋅ft (470 N⋅m)	
Ford Fairlane G8; Ford LTD	2005–2007	309 hp (230 kW); 369 lb⋅ft (500 N⋅m)	
Ford Falcon/Fairmont Ghia	2006–2007	309 hp (230 kW); 369 lb⋅ft (500 N⋅m)	
Ford F-150	2004–2008	300 hp (224 kW); 365 lb⋅ft (495 N⋅m)	Except 2004 F-150 Heritage model
Ford F-150	2009–2010	310 hp (231 kW); 365 lb⋅ft (495 N⋅m)	Rated 320 hp (239 kW) when using e85 fuel
Ford Expedition; Lincoln Navigator	2005–2008	300 hp (224 kW); 365 lb⋅ft (495 N⋅m)	
Ford Expedition; Lincoln Navigator	2009–2014	310 hp (231 kW); 365 lb⋅ft (495 N⋅m)	Rated 320 hp (239 kW) when using e85 fuel
Lincoln Mark LT	2006–2008	300 hp (224 kW); 365 lb⋅ft (495 N⋅m)	

=== 4-valve ===
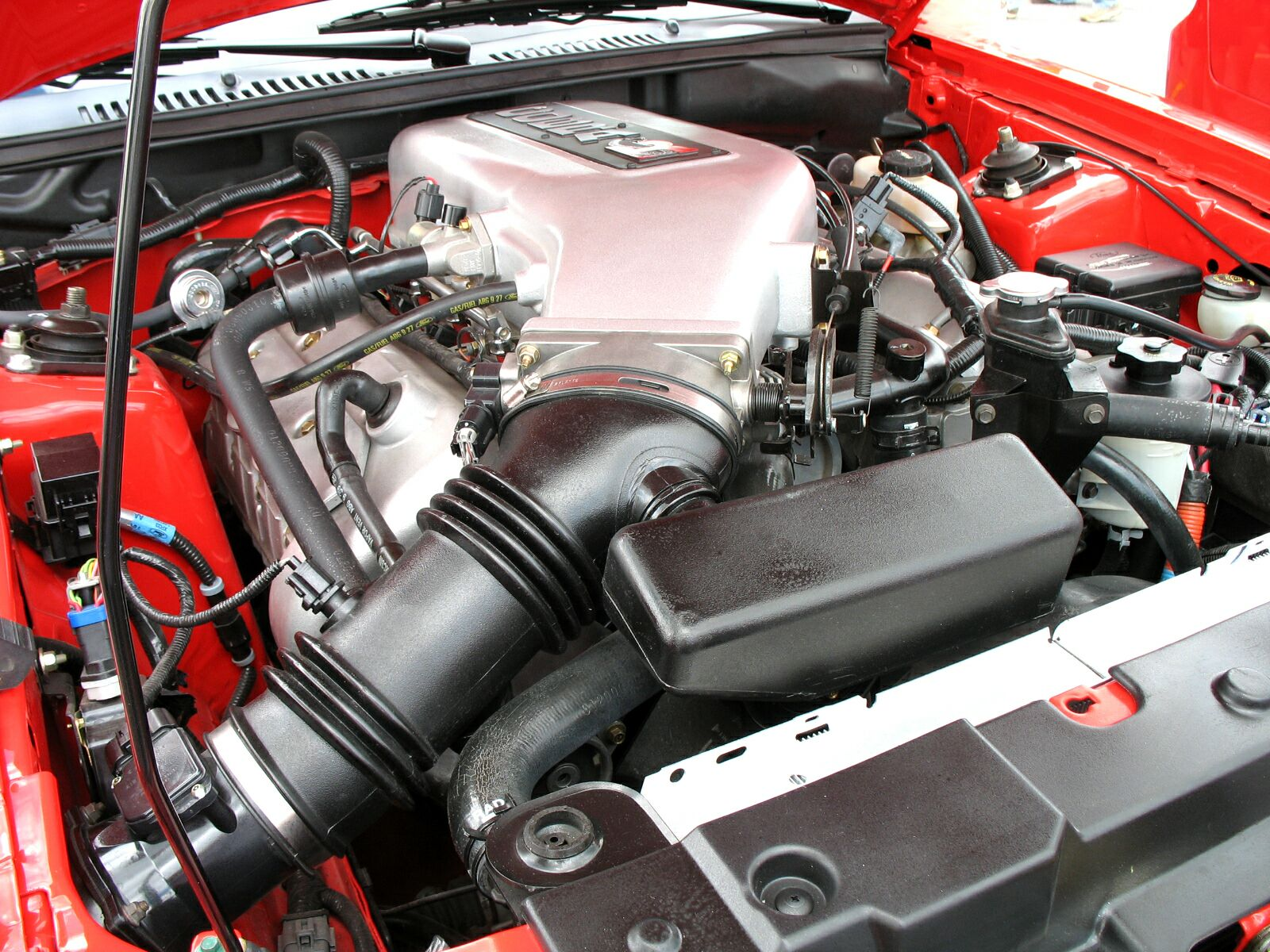
5.4 L 4-valve DOHC V8 installed in a 2000 Ford Mustang SVT Cobra R

In 1999, Ford introduced the DOHC 4-valve 5.4 L in the Lincoln Navigator under the InTech moniker, making it the second engine to use this name. Ford later used versions of the DOHC 4-valve 5.4 L in the 2000 Ford Mustang SVT Cobra R, the Ford GT supercar, and the Ford Shelby GT500. The DOHC 4-valve 5.4 L was also used in the Ford Falcon line in Australia under the Boss moniker until 2010, when it was replaced by a locally developed, supercharged version of the 5.0 litre Modular V8.

The SVT Cobra R version of the 5.4 L 4-valve V8 had several key differences from its Lincoln counterpart. While the iron block and forged steel crankshaft were sourced directly from the InTech 5.4 L, the Cobra R powerplant benefited from new, high-flow cylinder heads that were designed with features developed for Ford's "Rough Rider" off-road racing program, application specific camshafts with higher lift and more duration than other 4-valve Modular cams, forged I-beam connecting rods sourced from Carillo, forged pistons that provided a 9.6:1 compression ratio in conjunction with the 52 cc combustion chambers, and a unique high-flow "cross-ram" style aluminum intake manifold. The Cobra R was rated at 385 hp (287 kW) and 385 lb⋅ft (522 N⋅m) though chassis dynamometer results have shown these ratings to be conservative with unmodified Cobra Rs often producing nearly 380 hp (280 kW) at the rear wheels.

The Ford GT version of the 5.4 L (5,409 cc; 330.1 cu in) is a highly specialized version of the Modular engine. It is an all-aluminum alloy, dry-sump DOHC 4 valves per cylinder with an Eaton 2300 Lysholm screw-type supercharger and showcases numerous technological features, such as dual fuel injectors per cylinder and oil squirters for the piston skirts, not found in other Ford Modular engines of the time. This engine benefits from an improved version of the high-flow 2000 Cobra R cylinder head and unique high-lift camshafts, now rated at 550 bhp (558 PS; 410 kW) at 6500 rpm and 500 lb⋅ft (678 N⋅m) at 4500 rpm.

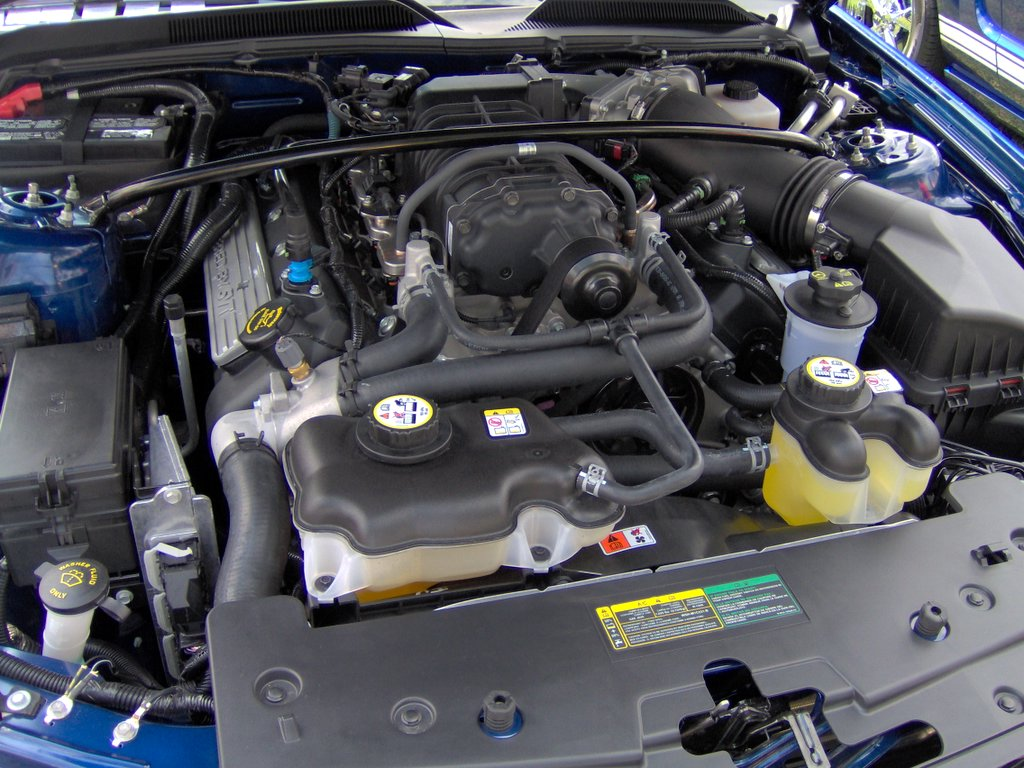
5.4 L 4-valve DOHC supercharged V8 installed in a 2007 Ford Shelby GT500

The Shelby GT500 uses a 4-valve DOHC 5.4 L with an Eaton M122H Roots type supercharger and air-to-liquid intercooler. The GT500 5.4 L shares its high-flow cylinder head castings with the Ford GT, with only minor machining differences, and shares camshafts with the 2003–2004 Ford Mustang SVT Cobra; which have less lift and duration than the Ford GT camshafts. The 2007–2010 GT500 engine used an iron engine block, while the 2011 GT500 5.4 L receives a new aluminum engine block, with Ford's first production application of their patented Plasma Transferred Wire Arc (PTWA) cylinder coating, eliminating the need for pressed in cylinder liners. The PTWA spray apparatus was co-developed by Ford and Flame-Spray Industries of Long Island, New York, for which they received the 2009 IPO National Inventors of the Year Award. The 2011 GT500 engine weighs 102 lb (46 kg) less than the previous iron-block version, thanks in part to the lack of cast iron cylinder liners. All of the 5.4 L 4-valve engines destined for use in SVT vehicles, such as the Ford GT and Shelby GT500, have been hand-built by technicians at Ford's Romeo, Michigan plant.

Vehicles equipped with the 32-valve DOHC 5.4 L include the following:

Vehicle Name	Production Years	Engine Output	Notes
Lincoln Navigator	1999–2004	300 hp (224 kW); 355 lb⋅ft (481 N⋅m)	
Lincoln Blackwood	2002	300 hp (224 kW); 355 lb⋅ft (481 N⋅m)	
Ford Mustang SVT Cobra R	2000	385 hp (287 kW); 385 lb⋅ft (522 N⋅m)	
Ford Shelby GT500	2007–2009	500 hp (373 kW); 480 lb⋅ft (651 N⋅m)	Supercharged; SAE J1349 certified
Ford Shelby GT500KR	2008–2009	540 hp (403 kW); 510 lb⋅ft (691 N⋅m)	Supercharged
Ford Shelby GT500	2010	540 hp (403 kW); 510 lb⋅ft (691 N⋅m)	Supercharged
Ford Shelby GT500	2011–2012	550 hp (410 kW); 510 lb⋅ft (691 N⋅m)	Aluminum block, Supercharged
Ford GT	2004–2006	550 hp (410 kW); 500 lb⋅ft (678 N⋅m)	Aluminum block, Supercharged
Ford Falcon XR8	2002–2008	349 hp (260 kW); 369 lb⋅ft (500 N⋅m)	
FPV GT	2003–2008	389 hp (290 kW); 384 lb⋅ft (520 N⋅m)	
FPV GT Cobra	2007	405 hp (302 kW); 398 lb⋅ft (540 N⋅m)	
FPV GT	2008–2010	422 hp (315 kW); 406 lb⋅ft (550 N⋅m)	
Brabham BT62	2018–2024	691 hp (515 kW); 492 lb⋅ft (667 N⋅m)	Tuned by Brabham
GT by Citroën	2008	646 hp (482 kW; 655 PS)	Concept car with modified Modular engine

== 5.8 L Trinity ==
The 5.8 is formally known as the Trinity Engine or 5.8-liter V8 engine, which benefits from cylinder heads with improved coolant flow, Ford GT camshafts, piston-cooling oil jets similar to those found on the 5.0 Coyote, new 5-layer MLS head gaskets, an over-rev function that increases the red line to 7000 rpm for up to 8 seconds (from 6250 rpm), and a compression ratio increased to 9.0:1 from 8.5:1. Displacement is 5.8 L (5,812 cc; 354.7 cu in) with a bore x stroke of 93.5 mm × 105.8 mm (3.68 in × 4.17 in). Boost is supplied by a 2.3 L Eaton TVS supercharger with maximum boost of 14 psi (0.97 bar). Trinity has 37 mm (1.5 in) intake valves and 32 mm (1.3 in) exhaust valves.

- 2013–2014 Ford Shelby GT500, DOHC 4 valves per cylinder, Aluminum block, supercharged and intercooled, 662 bhp (671 PS; 494 kW) at 6500 rpm and 631 lb⋅ft (856 N⋅m) at 4000 rpm of torque.

== 6.8 L V10 ==
The 6.8 L (6,760 cc; 412.5 cu in) SOHC V10 is another variation of the Modular family created for use in large trucks. Bore and stroke size is 3.552 in × 4.165 in (90.2 mm × 105.8 mm), identical to the 5.4 L V8. Both 2-valve and 3-valve versions have been produced. The 6.8 L uses a split-pin crank with 72° firing intervals and a balance shaft gear driven by the left camshaft to quell vibrations inherent to a 90° bank angle V10 engine. The engine's firing order is 1-6-5-10-2-7-3-8-4-9. The 2-valve version was first introduced in 1997, with a 3-valve non-VCT (the use of VCT was precluded by the presence of the balance shaft, as the shaft needed to remain in phase with the crankshaft) version to following in 2005.

Vehicles equipped with the 6.8 L V10 Modular engine include the following:

=== 2-valve ===
Vehicle name	Production years	Engine output	Notes
Ford E-250–E-450; F53 Motorhome	1997–2004	305 hp (227 kW); 420 lb⋅ft (569 N⋅m)	
Ford F-250–F-550; Ford Excursion	1999	275 hp (205 kW); 410 lb⋅ft (556 N⋅m)	
Ford F-250–F-550; F53 Motorhome	2000–2004	310 hp (231 kW); 425 lb⋅ft (576 N⋅m)	"Performance Improved" heads
Ford Excursion	2000–2005	310 hp (231 kW); 425 lb⋅ft (576 N⋅m)	"Performance Improved" heads
Ford E-350 & E-450	2005–2019	305 hp (227 kW); 420 lb⋅ft (569 N⋅m)	E350 and E450 available only as chassis cab and cutaway after 2015

=== 3-valve ===
Vehicle name	Production years	Engine output	Notes
Ford Super Duty	2005–2010	362 hp (270 kW); 457 lb⋅ft (620 N⋅m)	
F-450–F-550 Chassis Cab	2005–2019	288 hp (215 kW); 424 lb⋅ft (575 N⋅m)	
F53, F59 stripped chassis	2005–2019	320 hp (239 kW); 460 lb⋅ft (624 N⋅m)	
Ford F-650/F-750 Super Duty	2012–2019	320 hp (239 kW); 460 lb⋅ft (624 N⋅m)	
Blue Bird Vision	2011–2021	362 hp (270 kW); 457 lb⋅ft (620 N⋅m)	Equipped to run on gasoline and propane
New Flyer GE40LF/GE40LFR/GE40LFA/GE35LFR	2004–2013	305 hp (227 kW); 390 lb⋅ft (529 N⋅m)	ISE-Siemens ThunderVolt hybrid powertrain

== Ford Australia ==
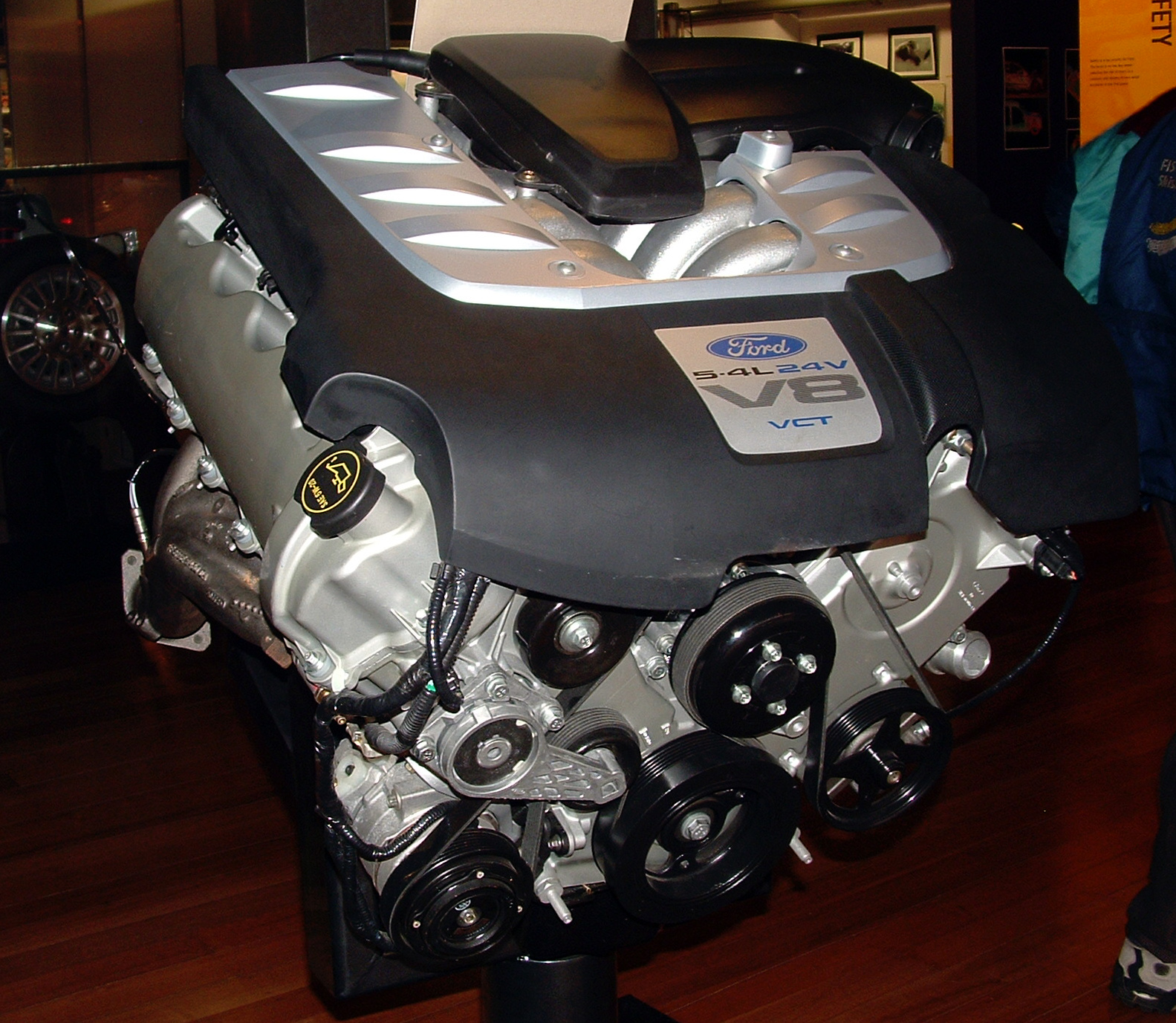
5.4 L 3-valve VCT SOHC Barra V8

Ford Australia used 5.4 L Modular V8s in the Ford Fairlane and Ford Falcon sedan model ranges, as well as in its high performance Ford Performance Vehicles (FPV) division models, until mid-2010, when they were replaced by the 5.0 L. The DOHC 5.4 L V8s are named Boss by Ford Australia. The 3 valve SOHC V8s in non-FPV vehicles are named "Barra" by Ford Australia.

Ford Australia 4-valve DOHC 5.4 L V8 engines include:

Variant	Power	Torque
Boss 260	349 hp (260 kW) at 5250 rpm	369 lb⋅ft (500 N⋅m) at 4250 rpm
Boss 290	389 hp (290 kW) at 5500 rpm	384 lb⋅ft (520 N⋅m) at 4500 rpm
Boss 302	405 hp (302 kW) at 6000 rpm	398 lb⋅ft (540 N⋅m) at 4750 rpm
Boss 302	405 hp (302 kW) at 6000 rpm	406 lb⋅ft (551 N⋅m) at 4750 rpm for the FPV GS model
Boss 315	422 hp (315 kW) at 6500 rpm	406 lb⋅ft (551 N⋅m) at 4750 rpm

== 5.0 L and 5.3 L Cammer ==
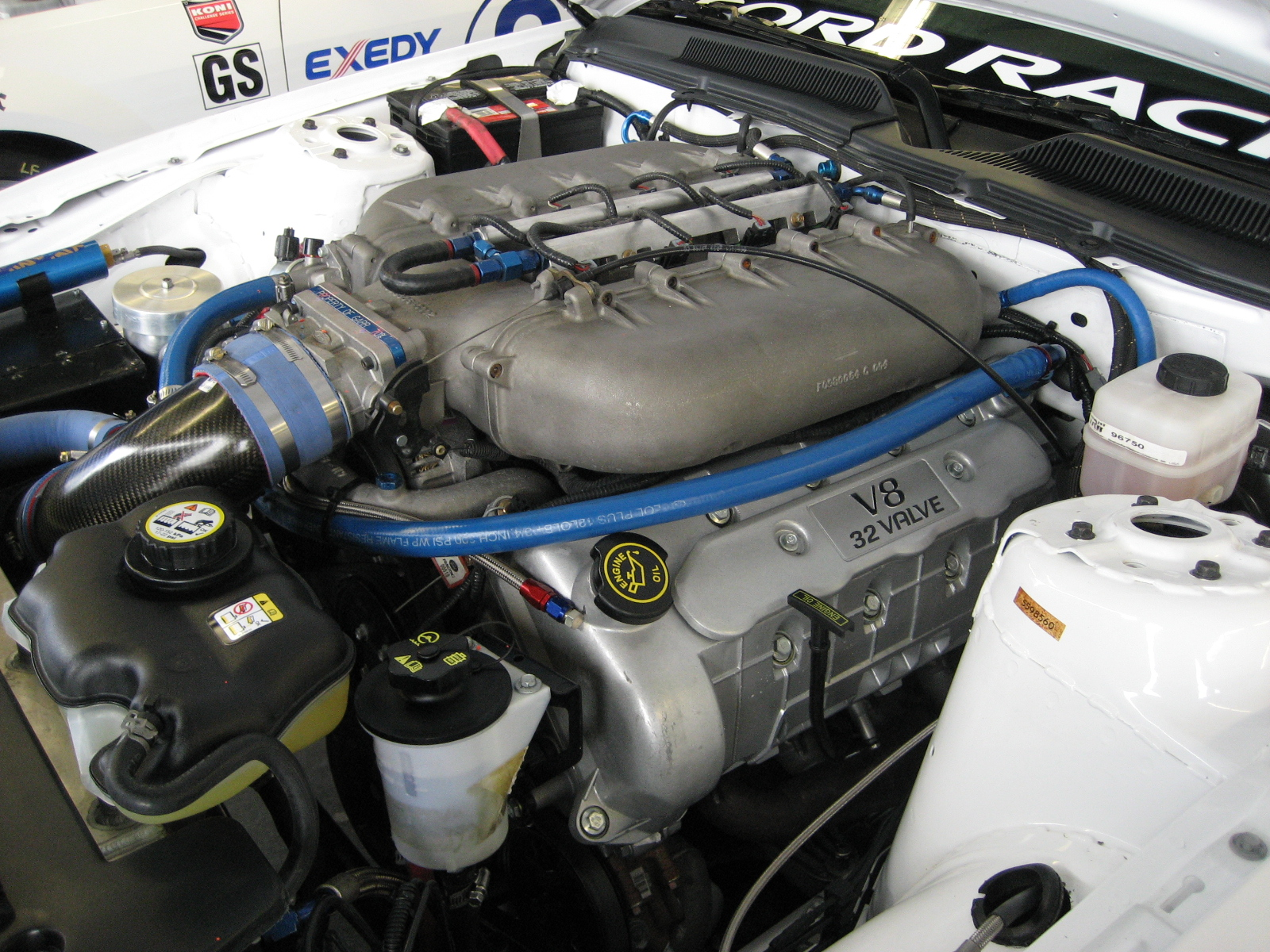
5.0 L R50 Cammer 4-valve DOHC V8 engine installed in a Grand-Am Cup Mustang FR500C.

In 2005, Ford Racing Performance Parts introduced a 5.0 L (4,997 cc; 304.9 cu in) V8 crate engine for use in motor racing and home-made performance cars, officially called M-6007-T50EA, but more widely known as "Cammer". Since then, other higher performance variations of the Cammer have been introduced for KONI Sports Car Challenge and GT4 European Cup. All versions of the Cammer are DOHC 4-valve per cylinder designs with a bore and stroke of 3.7 in × 3.543 in (94.0 mm × 90.0 mm). The Cammer achieves its larger 3.7 in (94 mm) bore by resleeving the 4.6 L aluminum block.

The T50 Cammer crate engine, the least expensive and most street oriented version, uses derivatives of the cylinder heads, variable runner-length magnesium intake manifold, and camshafts first used in the 2000 FR500 Mustang concept car. These parts are unique to the T50 Cammer crate engine and are not found in any other production Modular applications. The T50 has an 11.0:1 compression ratio and exceeds 420 hp (313 kW) with the proper exhaust manifolds.

The Cammer that has seen success in Grand Am Cup powering the Mustang FR500C is officially called M-6007-R50 and features a unique dual plenum, fixed runner-length magnesium intake manifold, Ford GT aluminum cylinder heads, unique camshafts of undisclosed specifications, and an 11.0:1 compression ratio. The R50 Cammer produces over 450 hp (336 kW) without restrictor plates. Upon introduction the R50 Cammer-powered Mustang FR500C proved to be dominant in Grand-Am Cup, having achieved five victories and podium appearances in nearly every race in the GS class during the 2005 season, giving David Empringham the championship title with the Multimatic Motorsports team, and Ford the manufacturer's title.

Robert Yates publicly expressed interest in using a similar 5.0 L 4-valve DOHC Modular V8 to compete in the NASCAR Winston Cup Series. Roush-Yates supplies a naturally aspirated 550 hp (410 kW) 5.0 L Cammer for use in the Mustang FR500GT3 and Matech-Ford GT3 which participate in the FIA GT3 European Championship, and a naturally aspirated 665 hp (496 kW) 5.3 L Cammer for use in the 2010 Matech-Ford GT1 that competes in FIA GT1 World Championship. The 5.3 L (5,288 cc; 322.7 cu in) Cammer's extra displacement is achieved via a 3.75 in (95.25 mm) stroke.

== World records ==
=== World's fastest production car ===
On February 28, 2005, the Koenigsegg CCR used a modified, Rotrex supercharged Ford Modular 4-valve DOHC 4.6 L V8, which produced 806 hp (601 kW), to achieve a top speed of 241 mph (388 km/h). This engine used a bore of 94.6 mm (3.725") and a stroke of 94 mm (3.700). The bore was achieved using Darton M.I.D. Sleeves. This certified top speed was recorded on February 28, 2005, in Nardò, Italy, and broke the McLaren F1's world record for fastest production car. The accomplishment was recognized by Guinness World Records in 2005, who gave the Koenigsegg CCR the official title of "World's Fastest Production Car." The Koenigsegg record was broken several months later by the Bugatti Veyron. This engine is the basis for Koenigsegg's twin-supercharged flexible fuel V8 seen in the CCX.

=== 1/8 Mile & 1/4 mile drag race world records ===
==== 1/4 mile ====
On November 23, 2019, Modular Motorsports Racing (MMR) with driver Mark Luton set the world record for the "world’s fastest Ford-powered vehicle in the quarter-mile," with a 5.67 second pass at 265.43 mph (427.17 km/h). The record was accomplished with a Coyote-based engine which featured factory Ford cylinder head castings, valves, lifters, and followers sitting atop a MMR designed billet reproduction of the factory architecture Coyote cylinder block. The specifics of the engine are described by Luton as being a "351 cubic-inch billet MMR block that has a Bryant crankshaft, BME rods, and MMR pistons that are manufactured by Manley," in addition to "cylinder heads [that] are a factory cast head from Ford… that work with the twin 94 mm turbos from Garrett." The elapsed time and mph records were recorded at the Las Vegas Motor Speedway, during a qualifying race hosted by Street Car Super Nationals (SCSN).

== Known issues ==
=== Intake manifold defect (1996–2002) ===
Starting in 1996, Ford began installing a DuPont Zytel nylon-composite intake manifold onto the 2-valve SOHC engines. Plaintiffs in class action lawsuits alleged that the coolant crossover passage of these intake manifolds may crack, resulting in coolant leakage. A US class-action suit was filed on behalf of owners, resulting in a settlement announced on December 17, 2005.

Starting with the 2002 model year, and implemented halfway through the 2001 lineup, Ford began using a revised DuPont Zytel nylon-composite intake manifold with an aluminum front coolant crossover that corrected the issue. Replacement intakes were also made available for 1996–2001 engines. To be eligible for reimbursement, owners needed to contact a Ford, Lincoln or Mercury dealer within 90 days of December 16, 2005. Further, Ford offered an extended warranty for this part, for seven years from the start date (which means the initial vehicle sale date) without a mileage limitation.

The following vehicles were included in this class-action suit settlement:

- Mercury Grand Marquis, 1996–2001
- Lincoln Town Car, 1996–2001
- Ford Crown Victoria, 1996–2001
- Mercury Cougar, 1996–1997
- Ford Thunderbird, 1996–1997
- Ford Mustang, June 24, 1997 – 2001 (some vehicles)
- Ford Explorer, early 2002

=== Spark plug issues (1997–2008) ===
2-valve 4.6 L, 5.4 L, and 6.8 L engines found in many 1997–2008 Ford, Lincoln, and Mercury vehicles may have aluminum cylinder heads with threads for spark plugs that are stripped, missing, or otherwise insufficiently bored out. Ford acknowledges this issue in Technical Service Bulletin 07-21-2 as well as earlier TSBs. Ford's TSB does not state that this issue is caused by owner neglect. For vehicles under the New Vehicle Limited Warranty, Ford will only cover the replacement of the entire cylinder head; however, the Ford recommended spark plug service interval extends beyond the duration of the New Vehicle Limited Warranty. Ford's only authorized repair procedure for out-of-warranty vehicles is to use the LOCK-N-STITCH aluminum insert and tool kit.

3-valve 5.4 L and 6.8 L engines built before October 9, 2007 and 3-valve 4.6 Ls built before November 30, 2007 found in many 2004–2008 Ford, Lincoln, and Mercury vehicles have an issue with difficult-to-remove spark plugs, which can cause part of the spark plug to become seized in the cylinder head. The source of the problem is a unique plug design that uses a 2-piece shell, which often separates, leaving the lower portion of the spark plug stuck deep in the engine's cylinder head. The 2-piece OE spark plug design is intrinsically flawed, thus making it susceptible to this problem. Ford acknowledges this issue in TSB 08-7-6 as well as earlier TSBs. Ford's TSB does not state that this issue is caused by owner neglect. The TSB provides a special procedure for spark plug removal on these engines. For situations in which the spark plug has partially broken off in the cylinder head, Ford distributes multiple special tools for removing the seized portion of the plug. Their TSB explains the multiple procedures required for handling the different cases/situations that occur when parts of plugs are seized in these engines. This repair is covered for vehicles under warranty; however, the Ford recommended spark plug service interval extends beyond the duration of the New Vehicle Limited Warranty.

== Similar engines ==
=== GT90 ===
Ford GT90 engine

Overview
- Manufacturer: Ford
- Production: 1995

Layout
- Configuration: 90° V-12
- Displacement: 5.9 L (360 cu in)
- Cylinder bore: 3.55 in (90.2 mm)
- Piston stroke: 3.04 in (77.2 mm)
- Valvetrain: 48-valve, DOHC, four-valves per cylinder

Combustion
- Turbocharger: Quad-turbocharged
- Fuel system: Fuel injection
- Fuel type: Gasoline
- Oil system: Dry sump

Output
- Power output: 720 hp (537 kW)
- Torque output: 660 lb⋅ft (895 N⋅m)

The engine used in the Ford GT90 concept sports car is a 90-degree, quad-turbocharged, V12 engine; which itself is based on the Ford Modular V8 engine. It was Ford's first V12 since their Lincoln division's Lincoln-Zephyr V12 engine in 1948. A 6.0-liter V12 engine was used in the Ford Indigo concept, but that engine was based on the Ford Duratec V6 engine, which has no relation to the V12 used in the GT90, and is also less powerful.

The GT90's 48-valve V12 is constructed on an aluminium block and head, displaces 5.9 L (5,927 cc; 361.7 cu in), and produces an estimated 720 hp (537 kW; 730 PS) and 660 lb⋅ft (895 N⋅m) of torque. It has a redline of 6,300 rpm. It is equipped with a forced induction system that uses four Garrett T2 turbochargers. The engine architecture was based on the 90-degree Ford Modular engine family, based on the same architecture and bore as the 4.6-litre V8 engine, but with four more cylinders added, two more in each cylinder bank, and a shorter stroke. This yielded a 90-degree V12, with a 90.2 mm (3.55 in) bore and a 77.3 mm (3.04 in) stroke with the cylinders arranged in two banks in a single casting.

The V12 engine, unique to the GT90, was developed by using a Lincoln Town Car as a test mule, in which they put the prototype engine in order to refine it.

== See also ==
- List of Ford engines
- List of Ford factories
