= Romeo Engine Plant =

Automoblie plant in Romeo, Michigan, US (1967–2022)

The Ford Romeo Engine Plant was a Ford Motor Company automobile plant located at 701, 32 Mile Road in Romeo, Michigan. The plant began in 1967 as a small Ford industrial equipment plant, and in 1973 it was expanded 10-fold to become an engine and tractor plant. From 1973 to 1988, tractor engines and parts, farm implements, and assembled tractors were made there. Shortly after 1990, the first 4.6 2-valve per cylinder V-8 engine was produced for the Lincoln Town Car. Most recently, it manufactured the Ford Modular engine. On December 30, 2022, it was announced the plant had permanently closed and employees were being offered either a buyout or transfer to another Ford factory.

== General Information ==
- The plant is built on 268 acres.
- Plants total area is 2.2 million square feet.
- Currently there are 1,074 total employees at the plant:
  - 952 are hourly
  - 122 are salary

The introductory paragraph states that Ford Romeo produced, among other things, 4.6L V8 engines for "tractors". The plant produced Ford tractors when first built, and until about 1988 as noted. Ford sold its tractor product line around that time, retained the plant, and converted it to production of its 4.6L and 5.4L "Modular" engines, beginning some time in 1990 for MY 1991 Ford, Mercury, and Lincoln cars and light trucks. The plant was subsequently expanded on 2001.

== Production ==
Previously the Romeo engine plant produces engines for the F-150, Mustang, Shelby GT500, Explorer, Econoline, Crown Victoria and the Mercury Grand Marquis. The plant is well known producing the Ford F-150 and the Mustang engines, due to the fact that both vehicles are iconic for Ford. The current engines the plant produces are the: 4.6 liter 4-valve V-8, 5.4 liter 4-valve supercharged, 4.6 liter 2 and 3-valve V-8 and 4.6 liter 2-valve flex fuel V-8 engines. In the past the plant has produced engines for the: Expedition, Lincoln Aviator, Lincoln Navigator, Ford GT (2005-2006), SVT Mustang, Mustang Mach 1 and Cobra. In 1996 is when the Romeo engine plant produced its first version of the 4.6 liter V-8 Cobra motor that was hand built. Production at the plant averages around 3,000 engines a day. Annually the plant produces on average 628,000 engines. The plant supplies to various Ford plants in: Dearborn, Mi.; Wixom, Mi.; Lorain, Oh; Norfolk, Va.; Kansas City, Mo.; Louisville, Ky.; Michigan Truck Plant in Wayne, Mi.; St. Thomas, Canada; Ontario, Canada; Mexico and Australia.

== Plant Operation ==
The plant operates on two lines, the first is a high volume line, and the second line is a niche line. The high volume line is more than 4,000 feet in length; it produces 140 engines an hour. The high volume line builds the 4.6 liter 2-valve and 3-valve V-8 engines and the 4.6 liter 2-valve flex fuel V-8 engines. The niche line is where employees hand build the 5.2 liter 4-valve supercharged engines for the Shelby GT500.

== Plant Achievements ==
The Ford Romeo Engine Plant is certified by the ISO 9000 standard for quality along with the ISO 14001 for environmental efficiency. This plant has also won the prestigious Shingo award for excellence in manufacturing in 2002. There was a nine percent improvement rate over the year of 2007 on the combined engine warranty data on a 4.6 liter engines. On February 19, 2009 the Romeo plant employees and Ford celebrated as they produced their ten millionth engine. This was a 4.6 liter 3-valve V-8 engine which was shipped to AutoAlliance International in Flat Rock, Michigan and was installed in a new 2010 Mustang GT.

== Layoffs ==
Due to 9/11 and the resulting recession of the economy, Ford suffered great losses and needed to start making cuts in employment. Ford announce by 2012 a total of 14 facilities and assembly plants will be shut down. In 2008, 300 employees were laid off due to the rising fuel prices and decrease in demand for the V-8 engines. More recently in February 2010, Ford spent 155 million on their Cleveland plant for upgrades and new engines were added to the Romeo plant.

== Closing ==
As part of the 2019 UAW contract negotiations, it was announced that the Ford Romeo Engine Plant would be closing. Employees would be offered positions at the nearby plants.
