= Puritalia Berlinetta =

Hybrid grand tourer manufactured by Puritalia Automobili

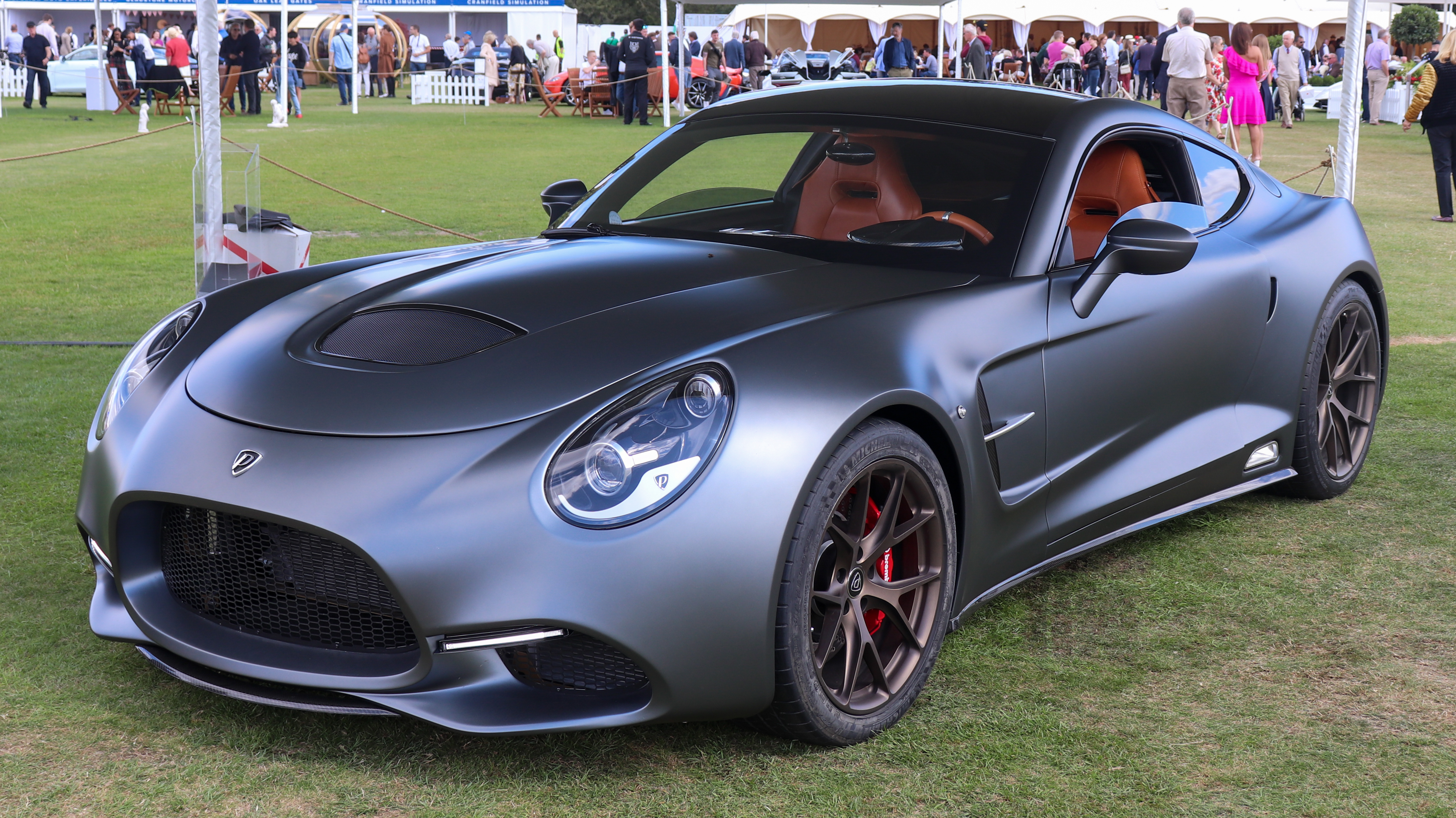

Overview
- Manufacturer: Puritalia Automobili
- Production: 2020 (expected; 150 units planned)
- Assembly: Naples, Campania, Italy
- Designer: Fabio Ferrante

Body and chassis
- Class: Grand tourer (S)
- Body style: 2-door coupé
- Layout: Longitudinal front mid-engine, all-wheel-drive

Powertrain
- Engine: 5.0 L Ford "Coyote" supercharged DOHC V8
- Electric motor: 1 YASA axial-flow
- Power output: Engine 750 PS (552 kW; 740 hp); Electric motor 215 PS (158 kW; 212 hp); Combined 965 PS (710 kW; 952 hp)
- Transmission: 7-speed automated manual
- Hybrid drivetrain: PHEV
- Battery: 5.2 kWh Lithium Iron Phosphate chemistry LiFePO_{4}
- Electric range: 20 km (12.4 mi)
- Plug-in charging: 3 hours

Dimensions
- Wheelbase: 2,701 mm (106.3 in)
- Length: 4,500 mm (177.2 in)
- Width: 1,982 mm (78.0 in)
- Height: 1,281 mm (50.4 in)
- Kerb weight: 1,410 kg (3,109 lb)

The Puritalia Berlinetta is a hybrid grand tourer manufactured by Italian automobile manufacturer Puritalia Automobili. Introduced at the 2019 Geneva Motor Show, it is the first car produced by the company. The car is intended to be a representation of the classic grand touring cars produced in the 1960s.

== Overview ==
The Berlinetta is an evolution of the 427 Roadster, a modern interpretation of the AC Cobra, introduced in concept form in 2012.

=== Powertrain ===
Internal Combustion Engine (ICE)
The ICE is an American supplied unit, namely a 5.0-litre double overhead camshaft V8 engine from Ford Motor Company. The engine is accompanied by a 2.9-litre twin-screw type supercharger. The block of the engine is cast from aluminium by an American supplier and is shipped to Italy for completion and installation. The engine has a power output of 750 PS (552 kW; 740 hp) and 848 N⋅m (625 lb⋅ft) of torque. The buyers have the option to engrave their name on the block of the engine. The engine has a longitudinal front mid-mounted position in order to achieve a 50/50 weight distribution.

Electric motor
The axial-flow electric motor is supplied by Britain-based YASA Limited and weighs 25 kg (55 lb). It is mounted on the rear axle of the car and has a power output of 215 PS (158 kW; 212 hp) and 370 N⋅m (273 lb⋅ft) of torque.

The combined power output of the powertrain amounts to 965 PS (710 kW; 952 hp) and 1,248 N⋅m (920 lb⋅ft) of torque.

=== Transmission ===
The engine is mated to a 7-speed automated manual transmission in order to handle the combined power output of the powertrain. The gearshifting is managed by two paddles mounted on the steering column.

=== Battery ===
The car comes equipped with two 5.2 kWh Lithium Iron Phosphate batteries housed under the trunk and behind the seats. The batteries allow the car to have an electric range of 20 km (12.4 mi) and have a charging time of 3 hours via a 700-volt charger supplied with the car.

=== Chassis and exterior ===
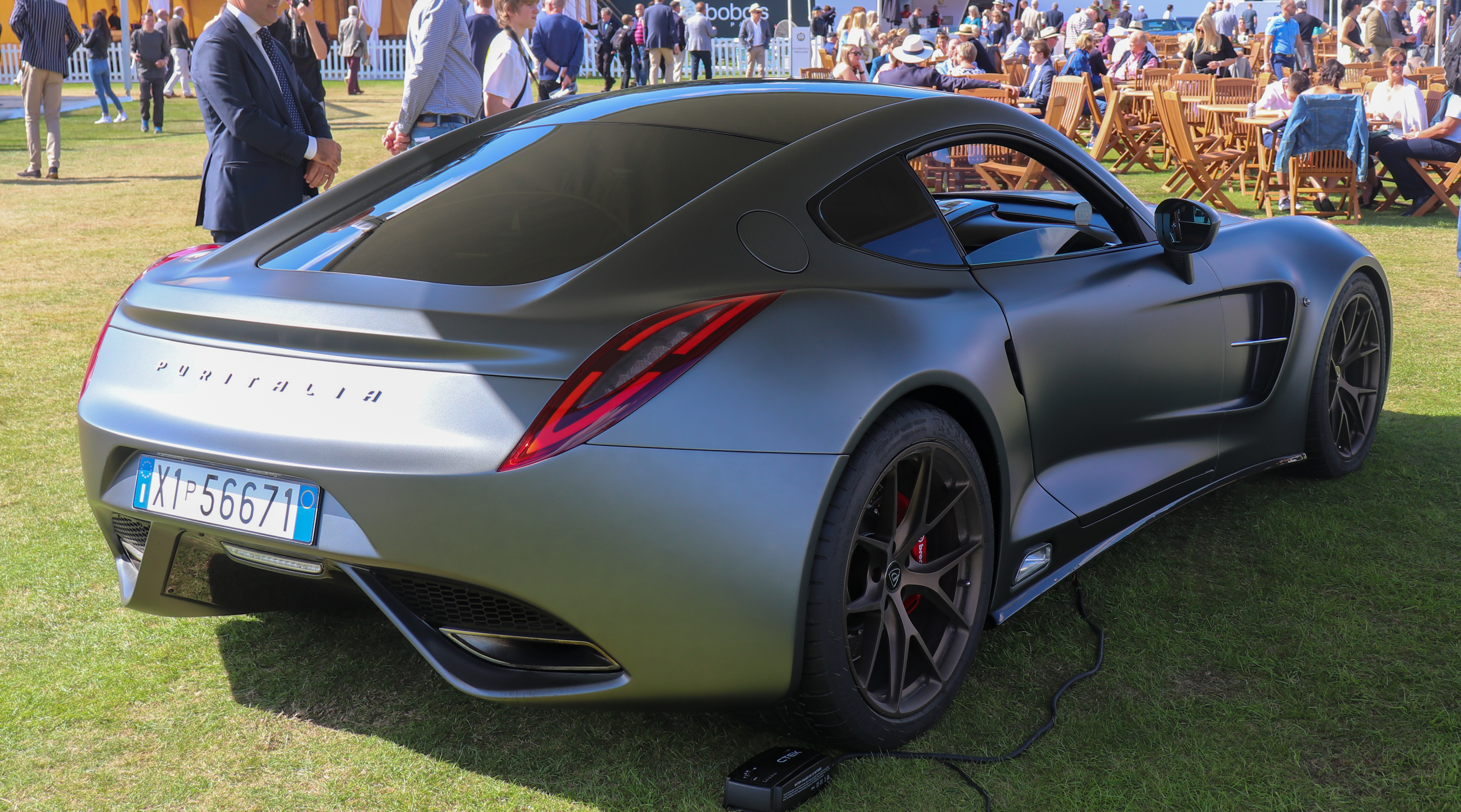
Rear view

The chassis of the Berlinetta consists of a carbon fibre monocoque mated to an aluminium subframe at the front and rear. The body is entirely made of carbon fibre and takes 800 man hours to complete.

=== Suspension, brakes and tyres ===
The Berlinetta is equipped with 19-inch forged alloy wheels wrapped in tyres measuring 285/30 at the front and 335/20 at the rear. The brakes are from AP Racing and have steel discs measuring 380 mm (15 in) front and aft having six-piston calipers at the front and four piston calipers at the rear. Carbon ceramic brakes are available as an option. The suspension system is milled from aluminium using a CNC machine.

=== Interior ===
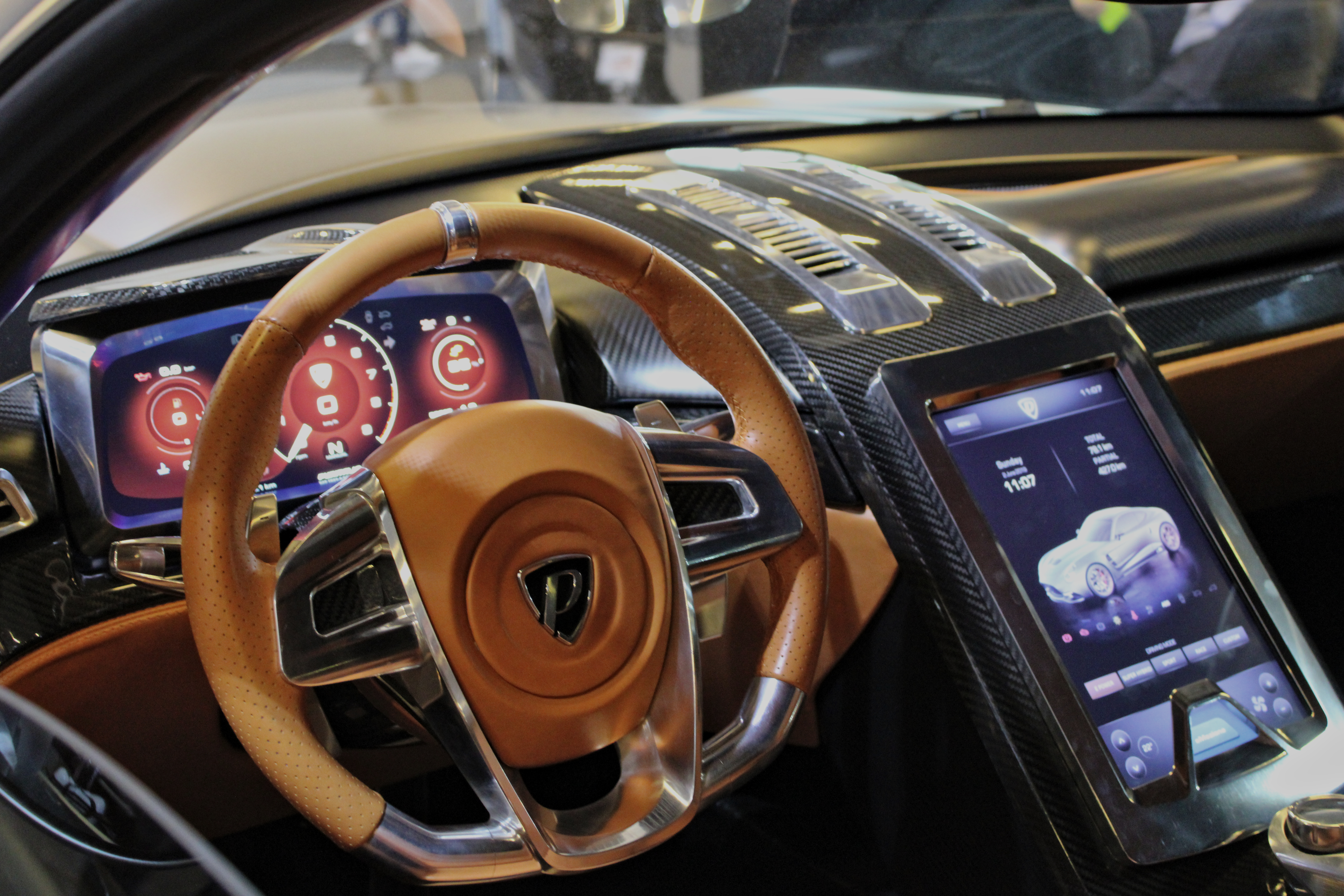
Interior

The interior of the car has leather upholstery and a centrally mounted 12.3-inch touchscreen instead of conventional buttons and levers. The touch screen controls most of the car's functions and a dedicated display behind the steering wheel displays vital data to the driver. The hybrid system of the car called Purhydrive is controlled by artificial intelligence via a specialised software. The car displays real time data about weather, road conditions and the traffic to the driver. The effective use of energy by the powertrain is determined by the server connected to the car via cloud networking.

The car has three driving modes namely Corsa, Sport and e Power with the latter running the car on the electric motor only. A special switch called the eMozione controls the torque produced by the electric motor and raises the torque of the motor to the maximum for 45 seconds.

== Performance ==
Manufacturer estimates
The Berlinetta can reportedly accelerate from 0–100 km/h (0–62 mph) in 2.7 seconds and has a top speed of 335 km/h (208 mph).

== Production ==
Production of the Berlinetta was planned to be limited to 150 units, with each car to be hand-built according to the customer's desire. The company stated that cars would be sold to selected "brand ambassadors" who appreciated the car. It is unknown if production ever began, and if any cars were produced other than the 2019 show car.
