= Plasma transferred wire arc thermal spraying =

Method of thermal spraying

Plasma transferred wire arc (PTWA) thermal spraying is a thermal spraying process that deposits a coating on the internal surface of a cylindrical surface, or external surface of any geometry. It is predominantly known for its use in coating the cylinder bores of an internal combustion engine, enabling the construction of aluminium engine blocks without cast iron cylinder sleeves.

The inventors of PTWA received the 2009 IPO National Inventor of the Year award. This technology was initially patented and developed by Flame-Spray Industries, and subsequently improved upon by Flame-Spray and Ford.

== Process ==
A single conductive wire is used as feedstock for the system. A supersonic plasma jet—formed by a transferred arc between a non-consumable cathode and the wire—melts and atomizes the wire. A stream of air transports the atomized metal onto the substrate. The particles flatten upon striking the surface of the substrate due to their high kinetic energy. The particles rapidly solidify upon contact and can assume both crystalline and amorphous phases. There is also the possibility of producing multi-layer coatings via stacked layers of particles, increasing wear resistance. All conductive wires up to and including 1.59 mm (0.0625 in) can be used as feedstock material, including "cored" wires. Refractory metals, as well as low melt materials, are easily deposited.

== Applications ==
PTWA can be used to apply a coating to wear surfaces of engine or transmission components, serving as a plain bearing. For the cylinder bores of hypoeutectic aluminum-silicon alloy blocks, PTWA's main advantages over cast iron liners are reduced weight and cost. The thinner bore surface also allows for more compact bore spacing, and can potentially provide better heat transfer.

Automotive engines that use PTWA include Nissan VR38DETT, and Ford Coyote. Caterpillar and Ford also use PTWA to remanufacture engines.
