= Engine block =

Part of an internal combustion engine

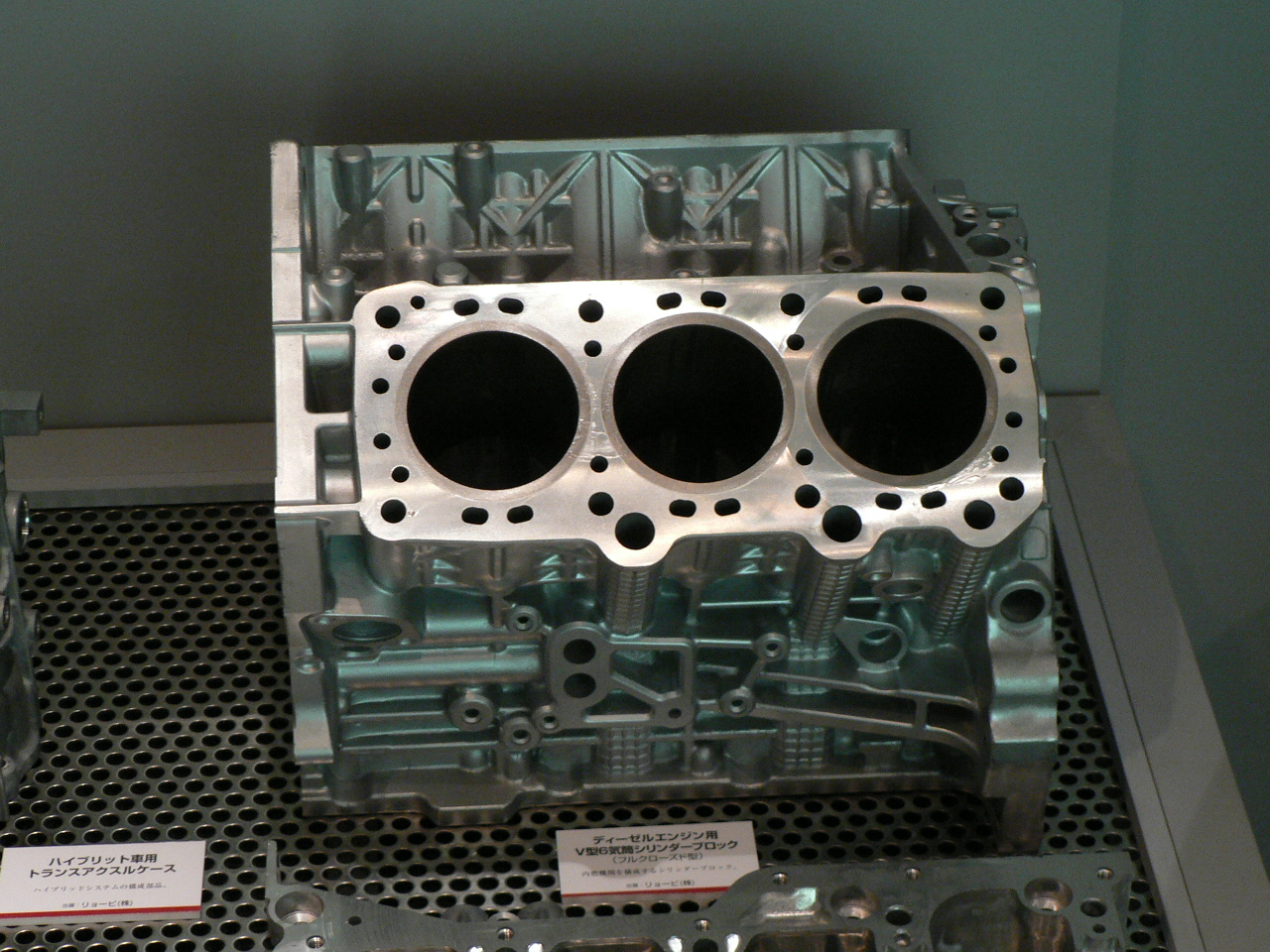
Block of a modern V6 diesel engine with dry liners. The large holes are the cylinders, the small round orifices are mounting holes, and the small oval orifices adjacent to the cylinders are coolant or oil ducts.

In an internal combustion engine, the engine block is the structure that contains the cylinders and other components. The engine block in an early automotive engine consisted of just the cylinder block, to which a separate crankcase was attached. Modern engine blocks typically have the crankcase integrated with the cylinder block as a single component. Engine blocks often also include elements such as coolant passages and oil galleries.

The term "cylinder block" is often used interchangeably with "engine block". However, technically, the block of a modern engine (i.e., multiple cylinders integrated with another component) would be classified as a monobloc.

== Construction ==
The main structure of an engine typically consists of the cylinders, coolant passages, oil galleries, crankcase, and cylinder head(s). The first production engines of the 1880s to 1920s usually used separate components for each element, which were bolted together during engine assembly. Modern engines, however, often combine many elements into a single component to reduce production costs.

The evolution from separate components to monobloc engine blocks has gradually progressed since the early 20th century. The integration of elements has relied on the development of foundry and machining techniques. For example, a practical, low-cost V8 engine was not feasible until Ford developed the methods used to build its flathead V8 engine. Other manufacturers then applied those techniques to their engines.

=== Cylinder block ===
Cylinder blocks for a straight-6 engine

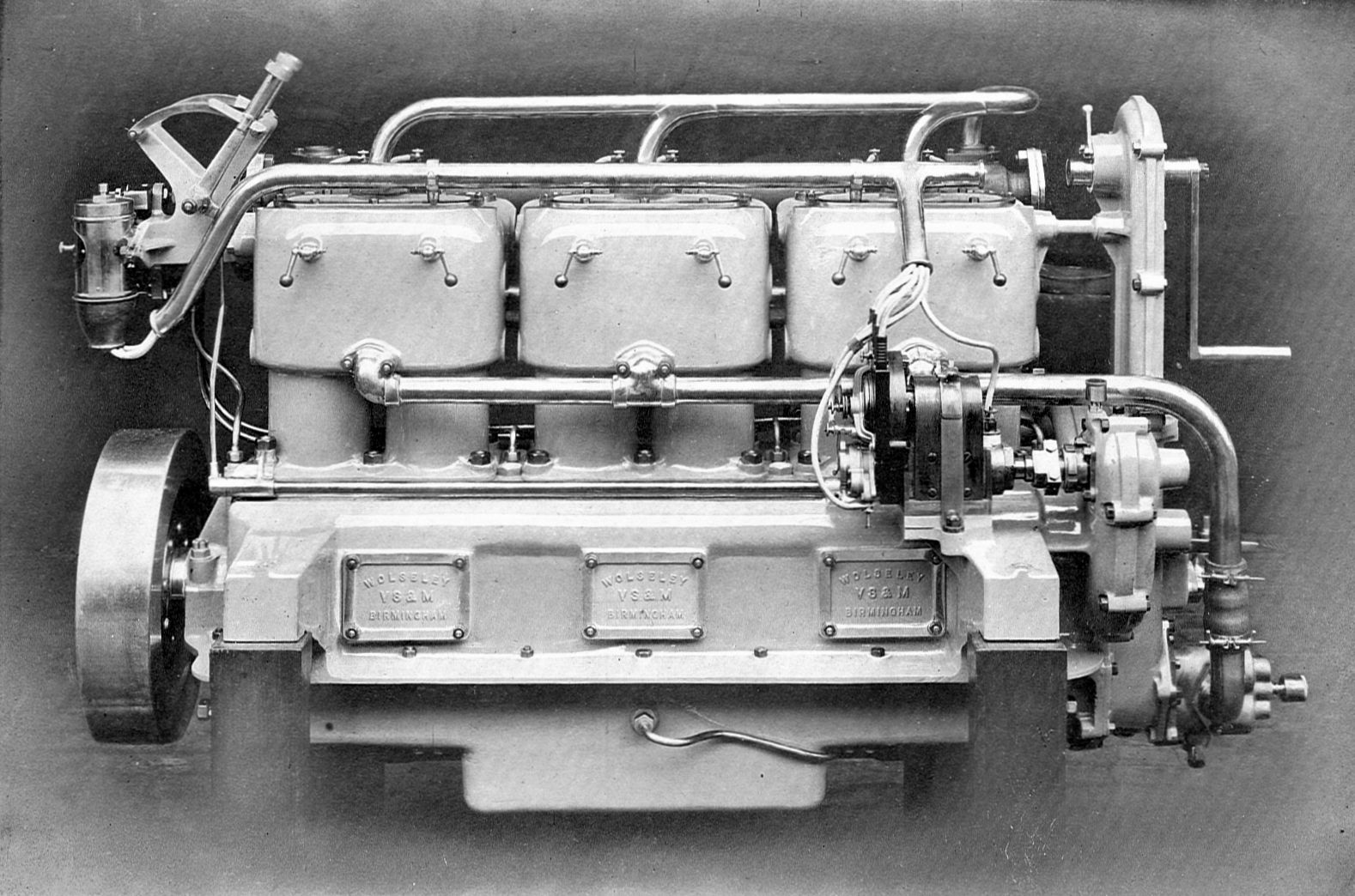
Marine engine with cylinders cast in three pairs

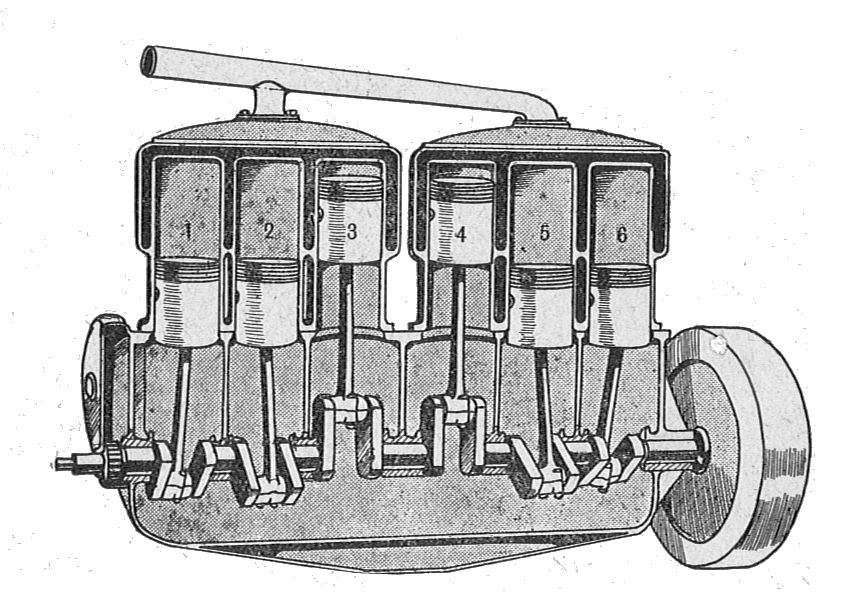
Cylinders cast in two blocks of three

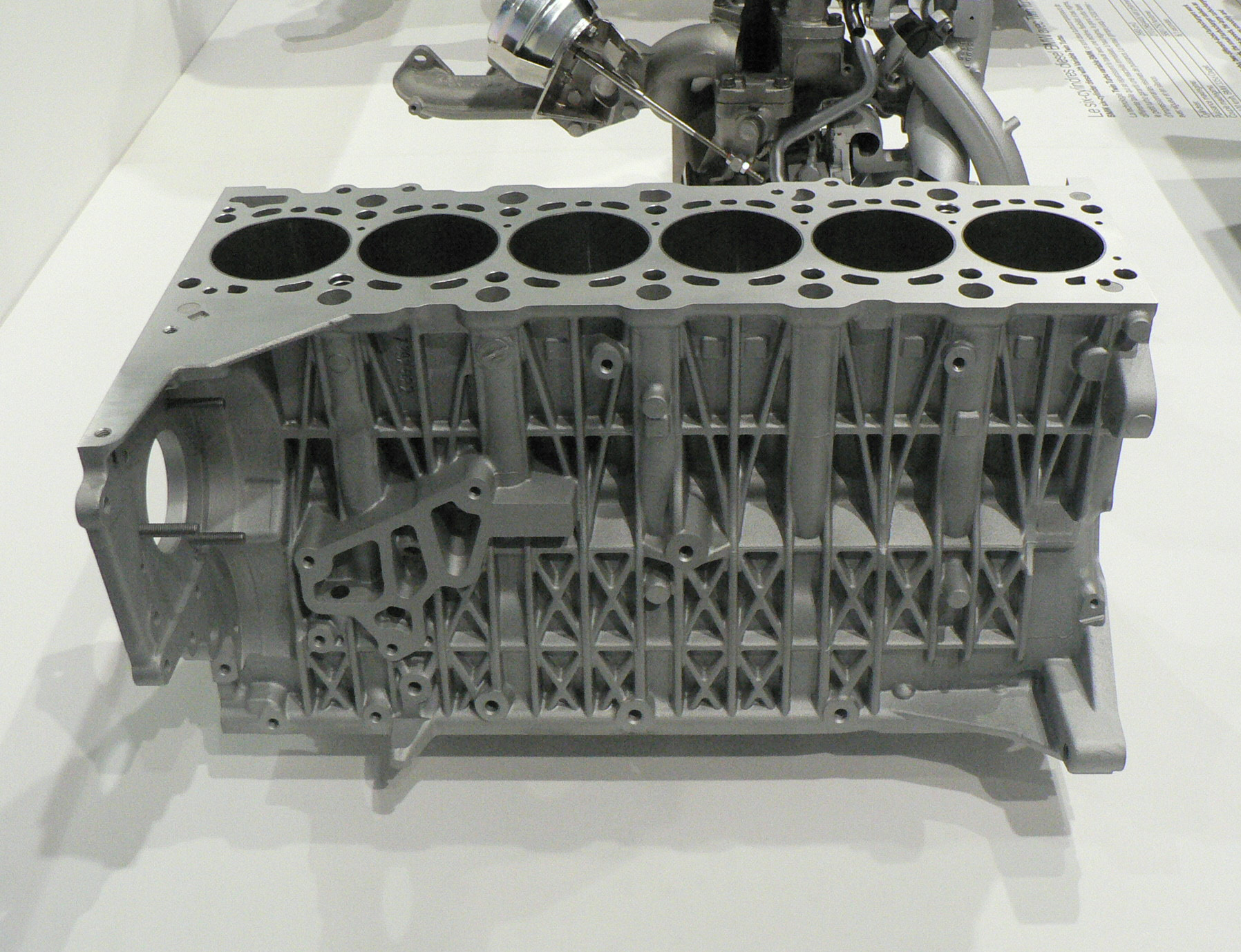
Cylinders cast in a single block of six, with an integrated crankcase (turbocharger in background)

A cylinder block is a structure that contains the cylinder, plus any cylinder sleeves and coolant passages. In the earliest decades of internal combustion engine development, monobloc cylinder construction was rare; cylinders were usually cast individually, with separate cylinder blocks produced for each cylinder. Following that, engines began to combine two or three cylinders into combined cylinder blocks, with engines combining several of these.

In early engines with multiple cylinder banks – such as V6, V8, or flat-6 engines – each bank was typically made of one or multiple separate cylinder blocks. Since the 1930s, mass production methods have developed to allow both banks of cylinders (as well as the crankcase) to be integrated into the same cylinder block.

=== Cylinder liners ===
Wet liner cylinder blocks use cylinder walls that are entirely removable and fit into the block by means of special gaskets. They are called "wet liners" because their outer sides come in direct contact with the engine's coolant. In other words, the liner is the entire cylinder wall, rather than merely a sleeve.

The advantages of wet liners are lower mass and bulk, and thanks to coolant being heated faster from a cold start, a wet liner engine has lower start-up fuel consumption and can start heating the car cabin sooner. Wet liner designs are popular with European manufacturers, most notably Renault and Peugeot, who continue to use them to the present.

Dry liner cylinder blocks use either the block's material or a discrete liner inserted into the block to form the backbone of the cylinder wall. Additional sleeves are inserted within, which remain "dry" outside, surrounded by the block's material.

For either wet or dry liner designs, the liners (or sleeves) can be replaced, potentially allowing an engine overhaul or rebuild without replacing the block itself. In reality, however, they are difficult to remove and install, and for most applications (such as most late-model cars and trucks) an engine will never undergo such a procedure in its working lifespan. It is likelier to be scrapped, with new equipment—engine or entire vehicle—replacing it.

=== Crankcase ===
The crankcase is the structure that houses the crankshaft. As with cylinder blocks, this is primarily an integrated component in modern engines.

=== Materials ===
Engine blocks are typically cast from either cast iron or an aluminium alloy. Aluminium blocks are much lighter and transfer heat more effectively to coolant, but iron blocks retain some advantages, such as durability and reduced thermal expansion.

Weight reductions through material selection. Presently, most of the engine blocks in mass production are gray castings. Reducing weight has resulted in using aluminum-silicon alloys more frequently for the engine block in small-displacement engines. Engine blocks of comparable design, but using Al-Si alloys, are not lighter than cast iron engine blocks in the same ratio as that for the specific weights of the materials.

In engine blocks made of gray cast iron, weight can be reduced by optimizing the structure and thin-wall casting. With this casting technique, a wall thickness of as little as about 3 mm is generally possible. In comparison, the walls of cast iron engine blocks are usually from 4.0 to 5.5 mm thick.

Using vermicular graphite cast iron (GGV), a casting material with great strength, enables weight reductions by about 30% compared to conventional casting materials such as GG 25. Weight reduction, to this extent, requires engineering for the engine block, taking into account the particular needs of the material.

== Monoblocs ==
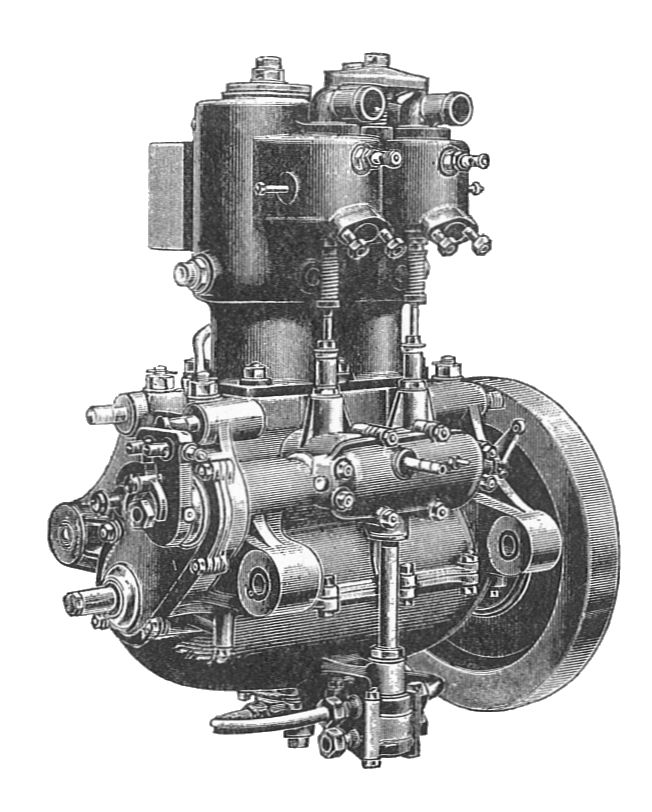
De Dion-Bouton engine, circa 1905. The cylinder heads are integrated into the engine block, but the crankcase is separate.

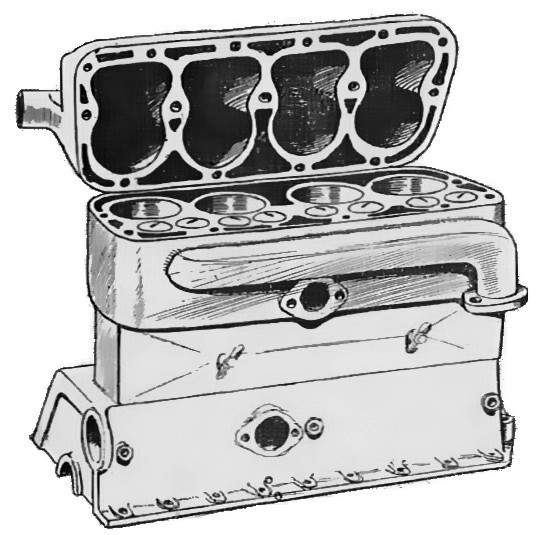
Typical 1930-1960 flathead engine with integrated crankcase. The cylinder head is tipped upwards for illustrative purposes.

An engine where all the cylinders share a common block is called a monobloc engine. Most modern engines use a monobloc design, and few have a separate block for each cylinder. This has led to the term "engine block," which usually implies a monobloc design, with "monobloc" rarely used.

In the early years of the internal combustion engine, casting technology couldn't produce large castings with complex internal cores (for water jackets etc). Most early engines, particularly those with more than four cylinders, had their cylinders cast as pairs or triplets of cylinders, then bolted to a separate crankcase.

As casting techniques improved, an entire cylinder block of 4, 6, or 8 cylinders could be produced in one piece. This monobloc construction was more straightforward and more cost-effective to produce. All the cylinders and crankcase could be made in a single component for straight engine cylinder layouts. One of the early engines produced using this method is the 4-cylinder engine in the Ford Model T, introduced in 1908. The technique spread to straight-six engines and was commonly used by the mid-1920s.

Up until the 1930s, most V engines retained a separate block casting for each cylinder bank, with both bolted onto a common crankcase (itself a separate casting). For economy, some engines were designed to use identical castings for each bank, left and right. A rare exception was the Lancia 22½° narrow-angle V12 of 1919, which used a single block casting combining both banks. The Ford flathead V8 – introduced in 1932 – represented a significant development in the production of affordable V engines. It was the first V8 engine with a single-engine block casting, putting a V8 into an affordable car for the first time.

The communal water jacket of monobloc designs permitted closer spacing between cylinders. The monobloc design approach also improved engines' torsional rigidity as cylinder numbers, engine lengths, and power ratings increased.

=== Integrated cylinder block and crankcase ===
Most engine blocks today, except some unusual V or radial engines and large marine engines, use a monobloc design with one block for all cylinders plus an integrated crankcase. In such cases, the skirts of the cylinder banks form a crankcase area of sorts, which is still often called a crankcase despite no longer being a discrete part.

Using steel cylinder liners and bearing shells minimizes the effect of the relative softness of aluminium. Some engine designs use plasma transferred wire arc thermal spraying, instead of cylinder sleeves, to further reduce weight. These types of engines can also be made of compacted graphite iron, such as in some diesel engines.

=== Integrated cylinder block and head ===
Integrated cylinder head engines

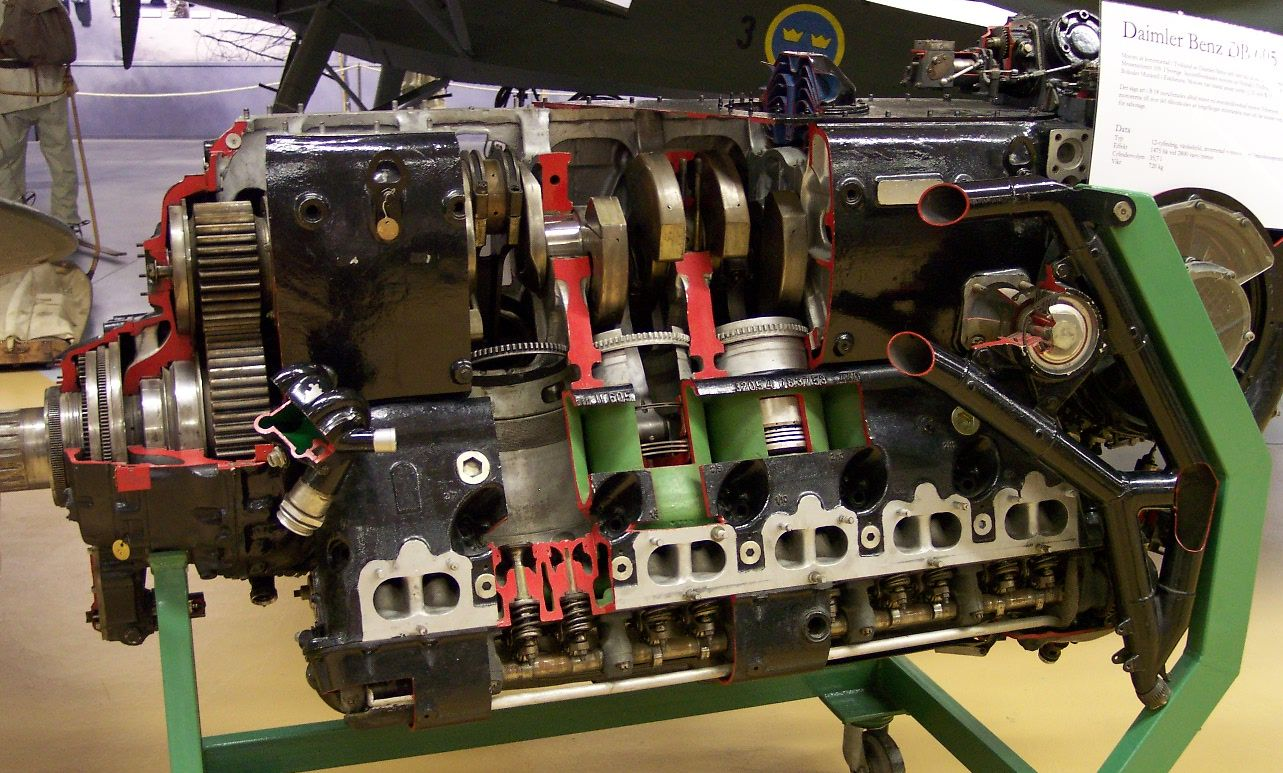
DB 605 V12 aircraft engine

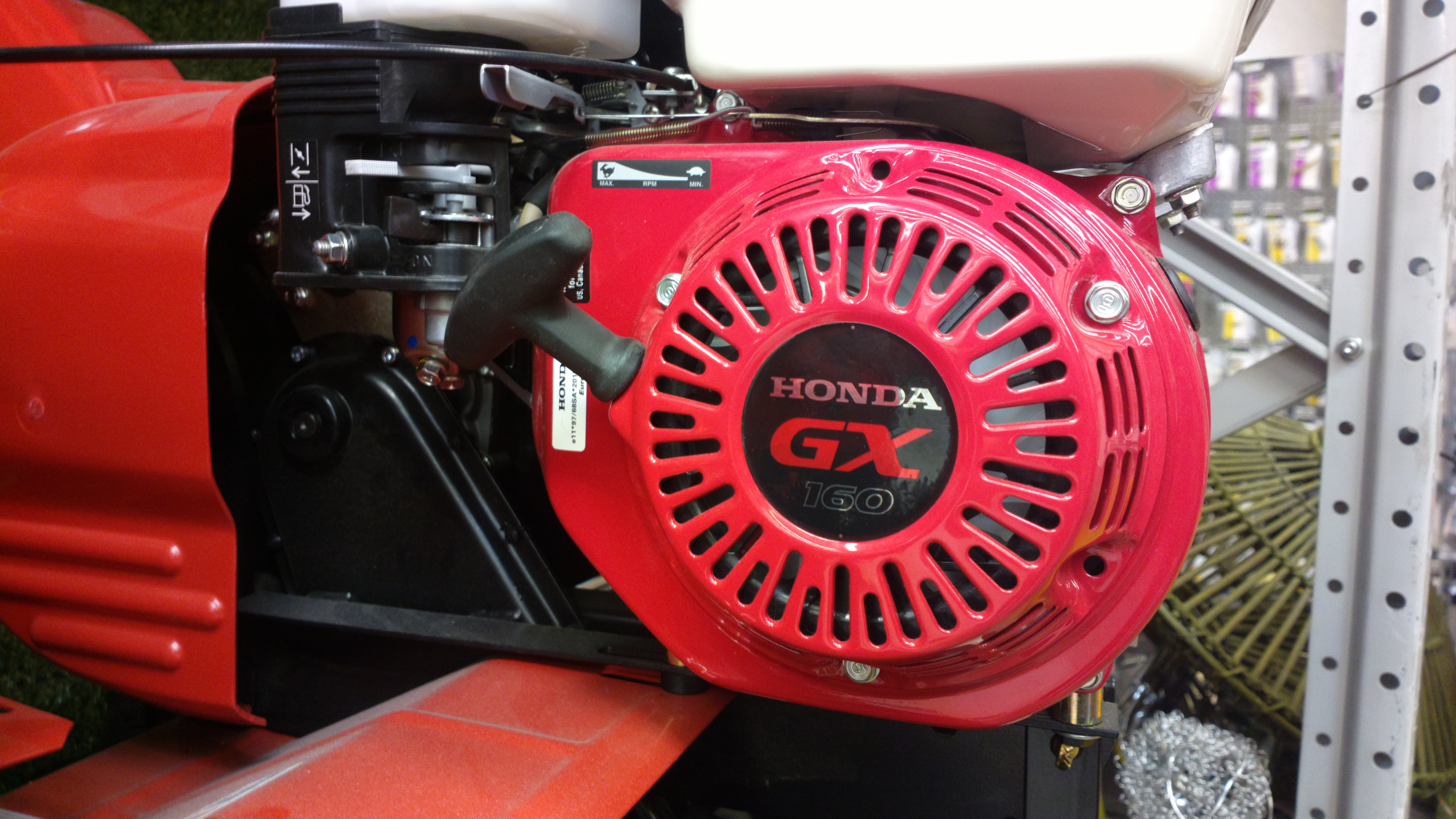
Honda GX 160 engine in a ride-on lawnmower

Some modern consumer-grade small engines use a monobloc design where the cylinder head, block, and half of the crankcase share the same casting. Apart from cost, one reason for this is to produce an overall lower engine height. The primary disadvantage can be that repairs become more time-consuming and impractical.

An example of engines with integrated cylinder heads are the Honda GC-series and GXV-series engines, which are sometimes called "Uniblock" by Honda.

=== Integrated crankcase and transmission ===
Several cars with transverse engines have used an engine block consisting of an integrated transmission and crankcase. Cars that have used this arrangement include the 1966-1973 Lamborghini Miura and cars using the BMC A-series and E-series engines. This design often results in the engine and transmission sharing the same oil.

Motorcycles such as the Honda CB750 use a similar layout, with the cylinder block and crankcase integrated with part of the transmission.

Many farm tractor designs integrate the cylinder block, crankcase, transmission, and rear axle into a single unit. An early example is the Fordson tractor.

== See also ==
- Core plug
- Cylinder head
- Head gasket
- List of auto parts
- Automobile engine replacement § Short block
- Automobile engine replacement § Long block
