= Cross-bolted bearing =

A cross-bolted bearing is a bearing, usually a crankshaft main bearing of a piston engine, reinforced with additional transverse bolts placed at 90-degrees to the load. Most bearing caps are retained by two bolts, one on each side of the bearing journal, and parallel to the cylinder axis (or, on vee engines, parallel to an axis bisecting the vee angle). A cross-bolted bearing has one or more additional bolts, at right-angles the first two. These bolts may be either two blind bolts threaded through the crankcase into the bearing cap from each side, or a single through bolt passing from one side to the other. Due to the dowel effect a through bolt is less effective.

Cross-bolted mains are not to be confused with "4-bolt mains", which (if not specified as being cross-bolted) feature a second set of bolts parallel to the first, which reinforce the main caps' attachment but do not provide the same resistance to the direction of the load as cross-bolted mains, nor do they reinforce the crankcase against twisting forces.
