= Chevrolet =

American automobile division of General Motors

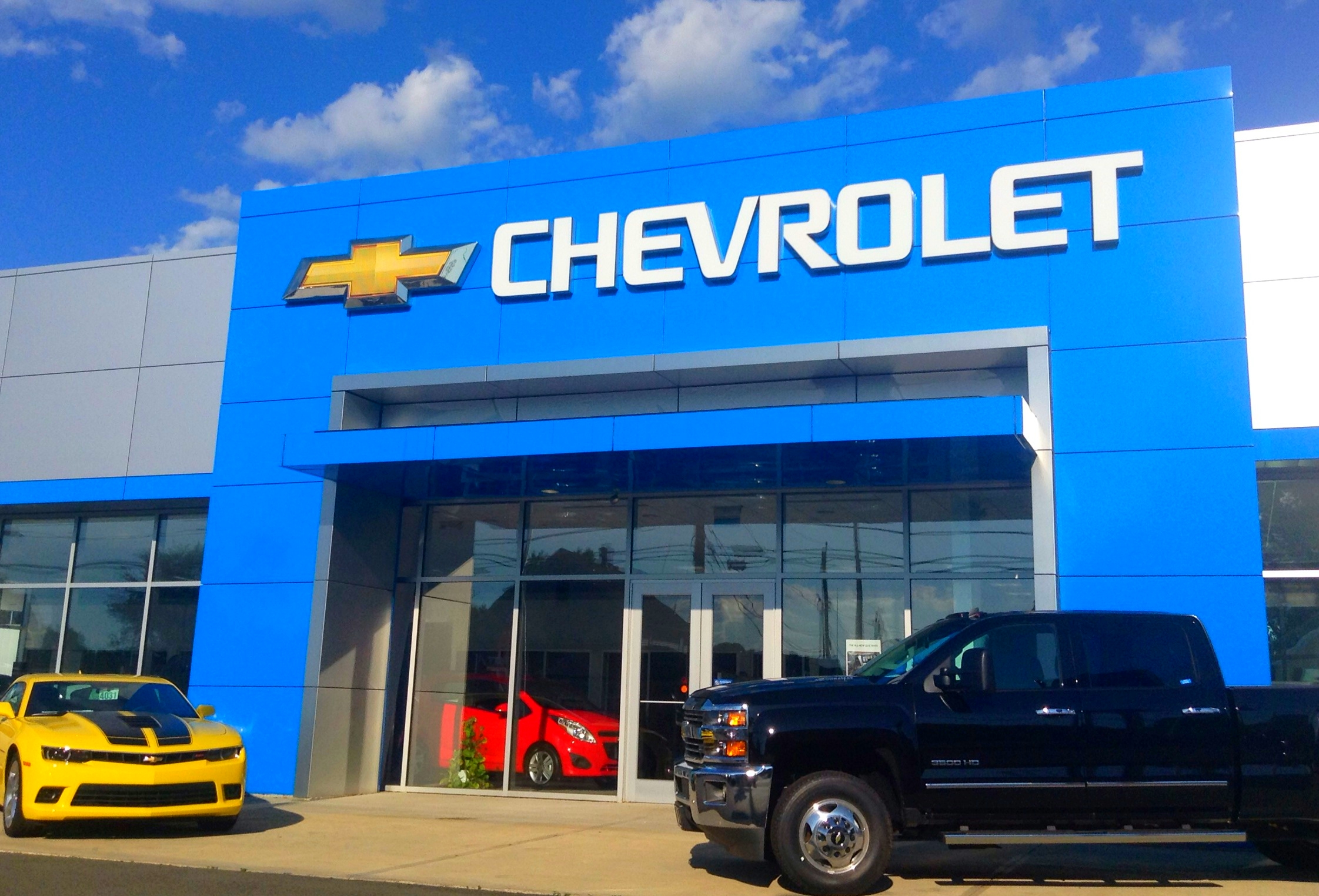
- Chevrolet dealership in Wallingford, Connecticut, June 2014
- Formerly: Chevrolet Motor Company; Chevrolet Motor Division of General Motors Company
- Type: Private (1911–18); Division (1918–present)
- Industry: Automotive
- Founded: November 3, 1911; 115 years ago
- Founder: Arthur Chevrolet; Louis Chevrolet; William C. Durant
- Fate: Acquired by General Motors in 1918
- Headquarters: Detroit, Michigan, U.S.
- Area served: List: Americas; Australasia; Central Asia; China (until 2026); Europe (excl. Russia and Belarus, defunct); Japan; Middle East; Philippines; South Korea
- Key people: Scott Bell (vice president)
- Products: Automobiles; Commercial vehicles Trucks
- Brands: Chevrolet Performance
- Services: List: Vehicle financing; Insurance; Maintenance; Repairs; Sales
- Parent: General Motors (1918–present)
- Website: chevrolet.com

Chevrolet (Note: Pronounced /ˌʃɛvrəˈleɪ/ SHEV-rə-LAY) is an American automobile division of the manufacturer General Motors (GM). In North America, Chevrolet produces and sells a wide range of vehicles, from subcompact automobiles to medium-duty commercial trucks. Due to the prominence and name recognition of Chevrolet as one of General Motors' global marques, "Chevrolet" or its affectionate nickname Chevy (Note: Pronounced /ˈʃɛviː/ SHEV-ee) is used at times as a synonym for General Motors or its products, one example being the GM LS1 engine, commonly known by the name or a variant thereof of its progenitor, the Chevrolet small-block engine.

Louis Chevrolet (1878–1941), an American born in French-speaking Switzerland, Arthur Chevrolet (1884–1946), Louis's middle brother, and ousted General Motors founder William C. Durant (1861–1947) started the company on November 3, 1911 as the Chevrolet Motor Car Company. Durant used the Chevrolet Motor Car Company to acquire a controlling stake in General Motors with a reverse merger occurring on May 2, 1918, and propelled himself back to the GM presidency. After Durant's second ousting in 1919, Alfred Sloan, with his maxim "a car for every purse and purpose", picked the Chevrolet brand to become the volume leader in the General Motors family, selling mainstream vehicles to compete with Henry Ford's Model T in 1919 and overtaking Ford as the best-selling car in the United States by 1929 with the Chevrolet International.

Chevrolet-branded vehicles are sold in most automotive markets worldwide. In Oceania, Chevrolet was represented by Holden Special Vehicles (HSV), having returned to the region in 2018 after a 50-year absence with the launching of the Camaro and Silverado pickup truck (HSV was partially and formerly owned by GM subsidiary Holden, which GM retired in 2021). In 2021, General Motors Specialty Vehicles took over the distribution and sales of Chevrolet vehicles in Oceania, starting with the Silverado. In 2005, Chevrolet was relaunched in Europe, primarily selling vehicles built by GM Daewoo of South Korea with the tagline "Daewoo has grown up enough to become Chevrolet", a move rooted in General Motors' attempt to build a global brand around Chevrolet. With the reintroduction of Chevrolet to Europe, GM intended Chevrolet to be a mainstream value brand, while GM's traditional European standard-bearers, Opel of Germany and Vauxhall of the United Kingdom, were to be moved upmarket. However, GM reversed this move in late 2013, announcing that the brand would be withdrawn from Europe from 2016 onward, with the exception of the Camaro and Corvette. Chevrolet vehicles were to continue to be marketed in the CIS states, including Russia. After General Motors fully acquired GM Daewoo in 2011 to create GM Korea, the last usage of the Daewoo automotive brand was discontinued in its native South Korea and succeeded by Chevrolet.

GM positions Chevrolet as the mainstream vehicle brand in its portfolio, below the premium Buick and GMC marquees and the luxury Cadillac division, although many vehicles share underlying platforms.

== History ==
=== Establishment ===
On November 8, 1911, the Chevrolet Motor Car Company was incorporated. It was founded by Swiss race car driver and automotive engineer Louis Chevrolet with his brother Arthur Chevrolet, William C. Durant and investment partners William Little (maker of the Little automobile), former Buick owner James H. Whiting, Edwin R. Campbell (son-in-law of Durant) and in 1912 R. S. McLaughlin CEO of General Motors in Canada. Former Buick officers were also employed, including Curtis R. Hatheway as secretary.

Durant was dismissed from his senior management position at General Motors in 1910, a company that he had founded in 1908. In 1904 he had taken over the Flint Wagon Works and Buick Motor Company of Flint, Michigan. He also incorporated the Mason and Little companies. As head of Buick, Durant had hired Louis Chevrolet to drive Buicks in promotional races. Durant planned to use Chevrolet's reputation as a racer as the foundation for his new automobile company. The first factory location was in Flint, Michigan at the corner of Wilcox and Kearsley Street, now known as "Chevy Commons" at coordinates 43.00863°N 83.70991°W, along the Flint River, across the street from Kettering University.

One of the technical advancements Chevrolet benefited from was the implementation of an overhead valve engine from the very beginning, as the company was developed by the former owner of Buick, which had patented the overhead valve and cross-flow cylinder design as being more efficient than the conventional use of the flathead engine.

Actual design work for the first Chevy, the costly Series C Classic Six, was drawn up by Etienne Planche, following instructions from Louis. The first C prototype was ready months before Chevrolet was actually incorporated. However, the first actual production was not until the 1913 model. So in essence there were no 1911 or 1912 production models, only one pre-production model was made and fine tuned throughout the early part of 1912. Then in the fall of that year the new 1913 model was introduced at the New York auto show.

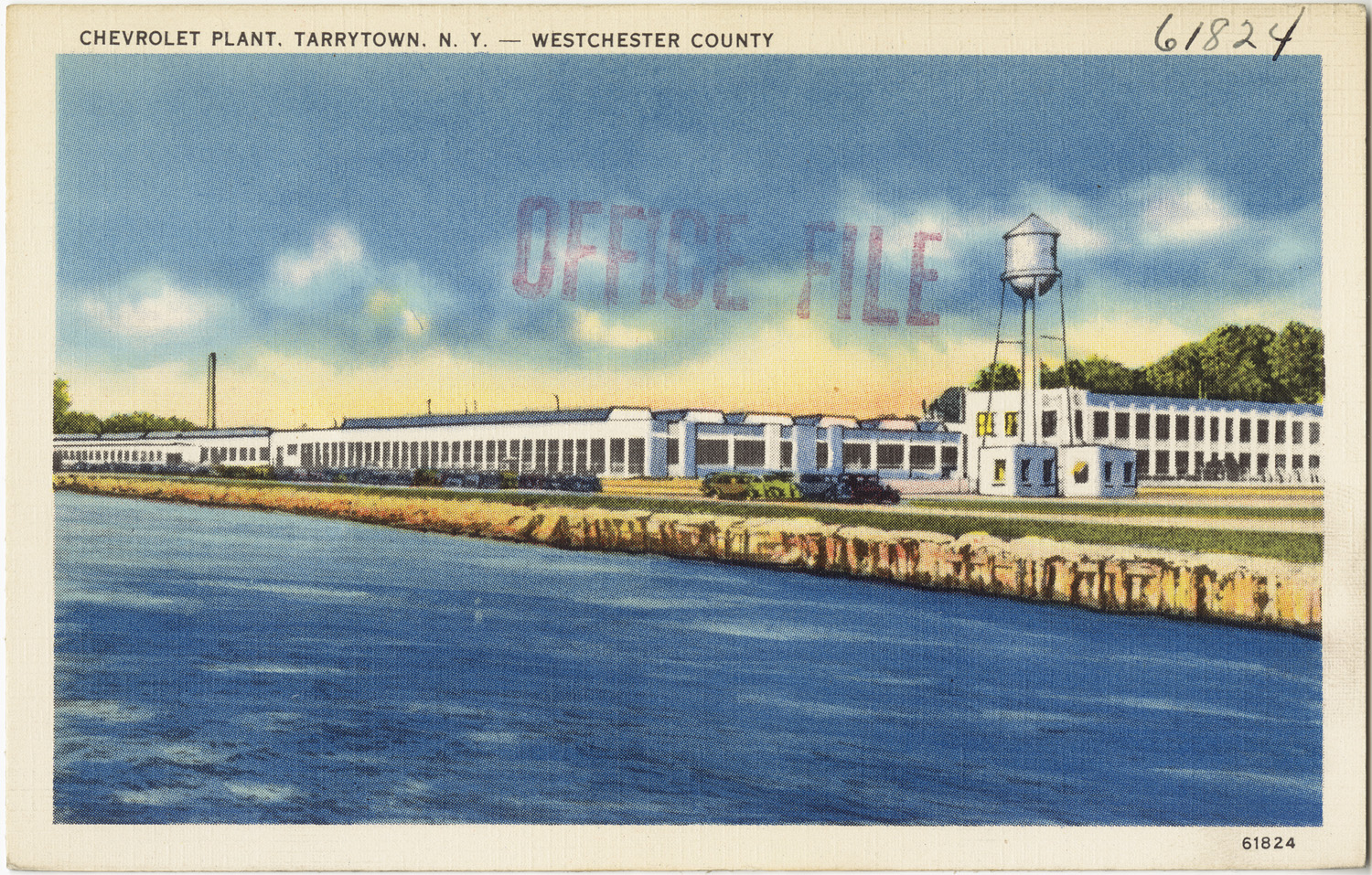
Chevrolet plant in Tarrytown, NY, c. 1918

Chevrolet first used the "bowtie emblem" logo in 1914 on the H series models (Royal Mail and Baby Grand) and The L Series Model (Light Six). It may have been designed from wallpaper Durant once saw in a French hotel room. More recent research by historian Ken Kaufmann presents a case that the logo is based on a logo of the "Coalettes" coal company. An example of this logo as it appeared in an advertisement for Coalettes appeared in the Atlanta Constitution on November 12, 1911. Others claim that the design was a stylized Swiss cross, in tribute to Chevrolet's home country. Over time, Chevrolet used several different iterations of the bowtie logo at the same time, often using blue for passenger cars, gold for trucks, and an outline (often in red) for cars that had performance packages. Chevrolet eventually unified all vehicle models with the gold bowtie in 2004, for both brand cohesion as well as to differentiate itself from Ford (with its blue oval logo) and Dodge (who has often used red for its imaging), its two primary domestic rivals.

Louis Chevrolet had differences with Durant over design and in 1914 sold Durant his share in the company. By 1916, Chevrolet was profitable enough with successful sales of the cheaper Series 490 to allow Durant to repurchase a controlling interest in General Motors. After the deal was completed in 1918, Durant became president of General Motors, and Chevrolet was merged into GM as a separate division. In 1919, Chevrolet's factories were located at Flint, Michigan; branch assembly locations were sited in Tarrytown, N.Y., Norwood, Ohio, St. Louis, Missouri, Oakland, California, Ft. Worth, Texas, and Oshawa, Ontario General Motors of Canada Limited. McLaughlin's were given GM Corporation stock for the proprietorship of their Company article September 23, 1933 Financial Post page 9. In the 1918 model year, Chevrolet introduced the Series D, a V8-powered model in four-passenger roadster and five-passenger tourer models. Sales were poor and it was dropped in 1919.

=== GMC Purchase ===
Beginning also in 1919, GMC commercial grade trucks were rebranded as Chevrolet, and using the same chassis of Chevrolet passenger cars and building light-duty trucks, sharing an almost identical appearance with GMC products. Until 1921, Chevrolet Corporate headquarters were located at 57th and Broadway in New York City until April when the office was relocated to the General Motors Building at Cadillac Place in Detroit. In January 1921 a General Motors management survey recommended that the Chevrolet Division be cancelled, but Alfred P. Sloan Jr. recommended that the division be saved and William S. Knudsen, a former Ford employee who oversaw production of the Model T, was made Vice President of Operations and performance improved In May 1925 the Chevrolet Export Boxing plant at Bloomfield, New Jersey was repurposed from a previous owner where Knock-down kits for Chevrolet, Oakland, Oldsmobile, Buick and Cadillac passenger cars, and both Chevrolet and G. M. C. truck parts are crated and shipped by railroad to the docks at Weehawken, New Jersey for overseas GM assembly factories.

=== 1920s to 1950s ===
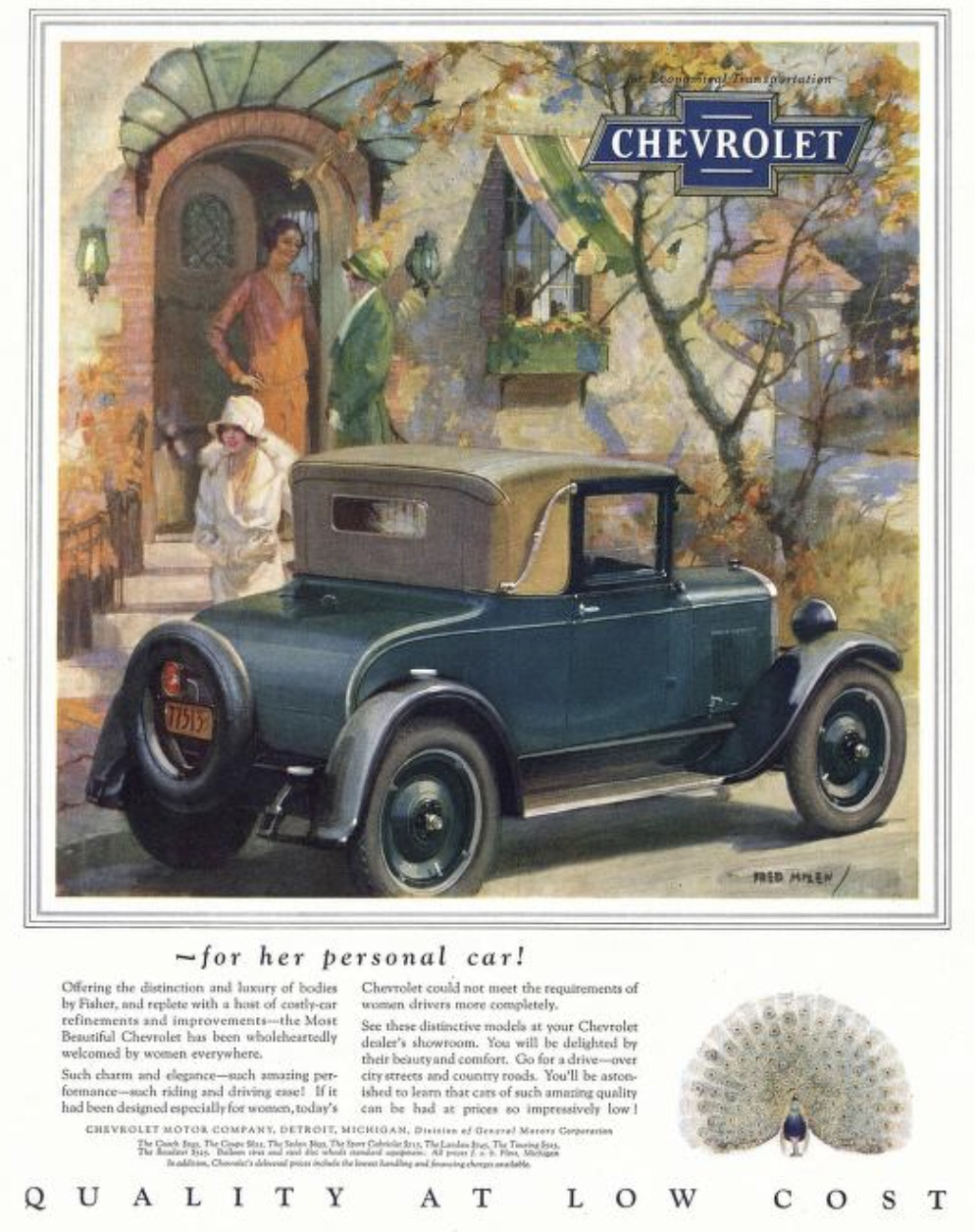
Chevrolet Capitol AA advertisement (1927)

Chevrolet continued into the 1920s, 1930s, and 1940s competing with Ford, and after the Chrysler Corporation formed Plymouth in 1928, Plymouth, Ford, and Chevrolet were known as the "Low-priced three". In 1929 they introduced the famous "Stovebolt" overhead-valve inline six-cylinder engine, giving Chevrolet a marketing edge over Ford, which was still offering a lone flathead four ("A Six at the price of a Four"). In 1933 Chevrolet launched the Standard Six, which was advertised in the United States as the cheapest six-cylinder car on sale. During the Great Depression the Chevrolet Master introduced a streamlined appearance, showing Art Deco influences and before and after the World War II era, the Chevrolet Deluxe and Chevrolet Fleetline found many buyers.

Chevrolet had a great influence on the American automobile market during the 1950s and 1960s. In 1953 it produced the Corvette, a two-seater sports car with a fiberglass body. In 1957 Chevy introduced its first fuel injected engine, the Rochester Ramjet option on Corvette and Chevrolet Bel Air passenger cars, priced at $484 ($5,548 today).

==== Small Block V8 ====
The basic Chevrolet small-block V8 design has remained in continuous production since its debut in 1955, longer than any other mass-produced engine in the world, although current versions share few if any parts interchangeable with the original. Descendants of the basic small-block OHV V8 design platform in production today have been much modified with advances such as aluminium block and heads, electronic engine management, and sequential port fuel injection. Depending on the vehicle type, Chevrolet V8s are built in displacements from 4.3 to 9.4 litres with outputs ranging from 111 horsepower (83 kW) to 994 horsepower (741 kW) as installed at the factory. The engine design has also been used over the years in GM products built and sold under the Pontiac, Oldsmobile, Buick, Hummer, Opel (Germany), and Holden (Australia) nameplates.

=== 1960s ===
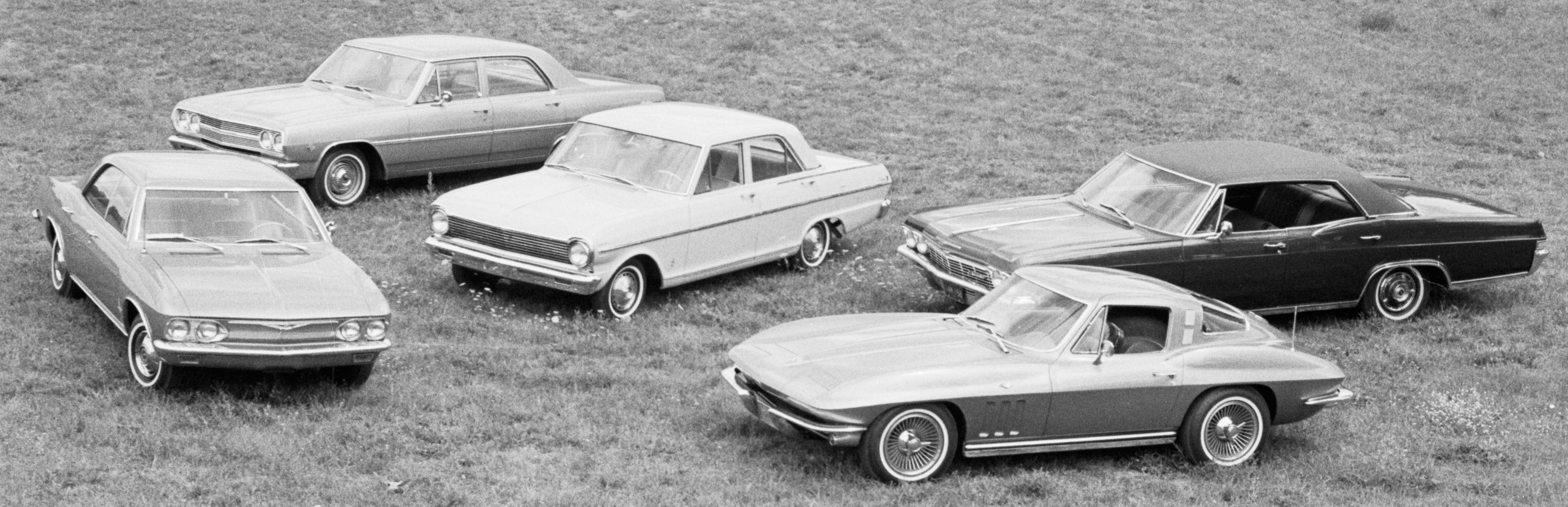
Five Chevrolets from the brand's 1965 lineup.

In 1960 Chevrolet joined the newly popular compact car market by introducing the Corvair, with a rear-mounted air-cooled engine. In 1963 one out of every ten cars sold in the United States was a Chevrolet. During the 1960s and early 1970s, the standard Chevrolet, particularly the deluxe Chevrolet Impala series, became one of the United States' best-selling lines of automobiles in history. During that era, the mid-sized Chevrolet Chevelle which was used to introduce the Chevrolet Monte Carlo, and the economically priced Chevrolet Nova, which was the basis for the Chevrolet Camaro, all were commercially successful and included family sedans, practical station wagons, and sporty coupes and convertibles.

=== 1970s and 80s Badge Engineering ===
As the popularity of small, fuel efficient imported vehicles began to find buyers in the US during the 1970s and 1980s, the Chevrolet Vega was introduced while the Chevrolet Chevette was the result of international collaboration. By the mid-1980s, the Vega was gone and the Chevette was about to be discontinued. Lacking a line of competitive small cars, Chevrolet imported several Japanese models and re-badged them as Chevrolets. The Suzuki-sourced Chevrolet Sprint and the Isuzu-supplied Chevrolet Spectrum were a better match to compete against the popular Toyota Corolla and Honda Civic. The Chevrolet Citation was the division's first compact sized front-wheel-drive car along with the Chevrolet Cavalier, followed up by the Chevrolet Celebrity. Chevrolet during the 1990s formed a partnership with Toyota and introduced the Geo Prizm while also offering the domestically produced Chevrolet Corsica. As mid-sized family sedans began to gain popularity, the Chevrolet Lumina found many buyers and as minivans began to find buyers, the Chevrolet Venture followed the popular selling Chevrolet Trailblazer and Chevrolet Traverse SUV's.

=== 2000s ===
In 2000, Chevrolet brought back the iconic Impala, although unlike its predecessors, this car was a mid-sized front-wheel drive four door sedan. It was produced until 2020, and the last generation (2014-2020) was larger and classified as a full-size passenger car.

In 2005, General Motors re-launched the Chevrolet marque in Europe, using rebadged versions of the Daewoo cars produced by GM Korea.

=== The Great Recession to the present ===
The 2008 financial crisis resulted in the bankruptcy of GM and subsequent discontinuation of GM brands such as Pontiac and Saturn. Some models such as the Captiva would be consolidated into Chevrolet's lineup as GM began developing more fuel efficient cars for the brand to compete with foreign carmakers. In late 2010, General Motors began production of the plug-in hybrid Chevrolet Volt, sold as the Opel/Vauxhall Ampera in Europe, which received multiple awards including the 2012 North American Car of the Year, European Car of the Year, and World Green Car of the Year. The Volt/Ampera family was the world's best selling plug-in electric car in 2012 with 31,400 units sold. The Opel/Vauxhall Ampera was Europe's top selling plug-in electric car in 2012 with 5,268 units, representing a market share of 21.5% of the region's plug-in electric passenger car segment. Combined global Volt/Ampera sales passed the 100,000 unit milestone in October 2015. As of June 2016, the Volt family of vehicles ranks as the world's all-time top selling plug-in hybrid, and it is also the third-best-selling plug-in electric car ever, after the Nissan Leaf and the Tesla Model S. Volt sales in the American market passed the 100,000 milestone in July 2016.

In October 2016, GM began production of the Chevrolet Bolt EV, the first ever affordable mass market all-electric car with a range over 200 mi (320 km). The Chevrolet Bolt won several awards including the 2017 Motor Trend Car of the Year award, the 2017 AutoGuide.com Reader's Choice Green Car of the Year, Green Car Reports Best Car To Buy 2017, Green Car Journal's 2017 Green Car of the Year, and was listed in Time magazine's Best 25 Inventions of the Year of 2016.

On February 14, 2021, Chevrolet unveiled the 2022 Bolt EUV and redesigned Bolt EV.

== International operations ==
Top ten Chevrolet sales markets 2011
Rank in GM	Location	Vehicle sales	Market share (%)
1	United States	1,175,812	36.9%
2	Brazil	632,201	13.3%
3	China	595,068	12.5%
4	Russia	173,485	3.6%
5	Mexico	162,461	3.4%
6	Canada	150,540	3.2%
7	Argentina	133,491	2.8%
8	Uzbekistan	121,584	2.6%
9	India	111,056	2.3%
10	Colombia	105,783	2.2%

Chevrolet sales 2021
Location	Vehicle sales
United States	1,437,604
Brazil	242,108
China	229,600
Mexico	118,969
Canada	108,786
Uzbekistan	> 100,000
South Korea	54,292
Chile	38,657
Colombia	34,624
Kazakhstan	> 28,500

As of 2010 Chevrolet had operations in over 140 countries, and global sales in 2011 set a record with 4.76 million vehicles sold worldwide.

=== North America ===
==== Mexico ====
Mexico has a mix of Chevrolet models from different GM brands and platforms branded as Chevrolet. The models come from Chevrolet USA, GM Korea, Mexico and other origins. Examples of Opel-sourced vehicles are Vectra, Astra, Corsa, Meriva, Zafira and Captiva (Opel Antara). Mexico also has some cars of its own, such as the Chevy C2, which is a reworked older-generation Corsa B. Vehicles based on US platforms are the Avalanche, the Suburban, the Equinox, the Tahoe, the Cheyenne (which is similar to the Silverado), the Aveo, the HHR, the Traverse, the Malibu, the Camaro and the Corvette. The Chevrolet Optra, assembled in South Korea by GM Korea, was also sold in Mexico. The second-generation Epica was sold as a business-only vehicle. In the past, GM also assembled the Suburban and Avalanche in Mexico for export to other markets, chiefly the U.S. and Canada.

=== Asia ===
==== China ====
In 2009 China became Chevrolet's third-largest market, with sales of 332,774 vehicles, behind only the United States and Brazil (1,344,629 and 595,500 vehicles respectively). By 2010, Chevy sold just over half a million, with the Cruze being its best seller there. A total of 673,376 locally-manufactured Chevrolets were sold in China in 2018 (down from a record of 767,001 in 2014). In 2018, Chevrolet held just 2.90% share of the Chinese market (down from a record market share of 5.33% in 2012).

The best-selling Chevrolet models in China by 2019 were the Cavalier (~ 10 000 units per month). Malibu (~ 3500 units per month), Equinox (~ 2000 units per month), Cruze - at one time the best-selling model (~ 1500 units per month), Sail (~ 1200 units per month), new Orlando (~ 1000 units per month), Malibu XL (~ 800 units per month), Trax (~ 100 units per month), Lova RV (~ 100 units per month), representing just 9 of the staggering total of 628 (sic) models of passenger cars being produced in China by February 2019.

In August of 2026, SAIC-GM announced that they would stop selling new Chevrolet branded cars in the Chinese market due to low demand, breaking their record for nearly 21 years in the country. However, SAIC-GM has stated that while the brand will be phased out, their manufacturing plants that make the Spark EUV, Captiva (Starlight S) and other rebadged vehicles along with the upcoming "Joy" will still make and export new vehicles for global markets outside of the US.

==== India ====
Until 2003, GM India—originally a joint venture with Hindustan Motors, sold the Opel Corsa, Opel Astra and the Opel Vectra. Launched by GM's India operations, Chevrolet officially began business in India on June 6, 2003. The Corsa and Astra were built at a plant in Halol, Gujarat.

Chevrolet sold the Chevrolet Cruze, Chevrolet Spark, Chevrolet Optra, Chevrolet Aveo and Aveo U-VA, Chevrolet Tavera, Chevrolet Captiva, Chevrolet SRV, Chevrolet Beat, and Chevrolet Sail. The Chevrolet Forester, a rebadged Subaru, was imported directly from Fuji Heavy Industries in Japan until 2005. The Cruze and Tavera were built at the Halol plant. Chevrolet also was the sole engine supplier for the Formula Rolon single-seater series in India. In 2017, GM ceased the production and sale of Chevrolet cars in India, but it continues to run service centers.

==== Indonesia ====
In 1999, Opel was rebranded to Chevrolet as a coincidence of Chevy's entry to Indonesia. Chevrolet stopped selling cars and ceased production in Indonesia by the end of March 2020.

==== Japan ====
From 1995 to 2000 Toyota in an agreement with GM sold the third-generation model Chevrolet Cavalier as the Toyota Cavalier in Japan in exchange for the Geo/Chevrolet Prism in an effort to avoid additional restrictions on their exports to the US. The OHV Chevrolet Stovebolt engine was used and reverse-engineered by Toyota when they created the Toyota Type A engine when GM had a factory manufacturing GM cars in Japan at Osaka Assembly during the 1920s. In the mid-2000s, Suzuki imported and marketed the Chevrolet TrailBlazer and the Chevrolet Optra wagon in Japan. Suzuki, a GM partner, also assembled and marketed the Chevrolet MW microvan. The MW was originally a rebadged Suzuki Wagon R+ and later a rebadged Suzuki Solio. Suzuki had also marketed the Chevrolet Cruze subcompact in the past.

In the 2010s, General Motors Japan Limited distributed and marketed the Sonic, Captiva, Camaro, and Corvette in limited numbers through an agreement with Yanase Co., Ltd. dealerships. In the 2000s, General Motors Asia Pacific (Japan) had distributed and marketed the TrailBlazer also. As of 2010, Mitsui Bussan Automotive distributes and markets the Chevrolet Tahoe, Chevrolet Express, Chevrolet HHR, Silverado, and Traverse.

Previously, it had also marketed the Starcraft versions of the G-Van and Chevrolet TrailBlazer. Mitsui Bussan Automotive had been importing and distributing certain GM models since 1992, but will cease their GM import business in November 2011, as GM Japan wants to consolidate the distribution channels. The Chevrolet models that have been imported by Mitsui will no longer be sold once existing inventories are depleted. As of 2022, General Motors Japan imports and distributes the Camaro and right-hand-drive Corvette in Japan.

==== Kazakhstan ====
Kazakhstan-based Allure Group of Companies and Uzbekistan-based UzAuto Motors opened an assembly plant for the manufacture of Chevrolet-branded cars in March 2020, in the city of Kostanay. As of 2024, the vehicles are assembled from semi-knocked-down or complete-knocked-down kits. Assembly of the Chevrolet Onix from complete knock-down kits commenced at the plant in March 2024. A separate dealer in Almaty, authorized by GM, imports and sells the Tahoe and Traverse.

==== Kyrgyzstan ====
Uzbekistan-based UzAuto Motors and Kyrgyz supplier DT Technikis are opening an assembly plant near Bishkek in the summer of 2024. Components will initially be imported from Uzbekistan, with plans to build components independently in the coming years. The plant will assemble Chevrolet and Isuzu vehicles. The Chevrolet brand has been licensed from GM. The plant will assemble 10,000 cars from semi-knocked-down kits within the first twenty months, with increased production expected. The Chevrolet Cobalt compact sedan will be the first Chevrolet-branded vehicle to be assembled at the plant, with plans to expand to many other models in the coming years.

==== Malaysia ====
Chevrolet entered the Malaysian market in 2003, replacing Opel. Between 2003 and 2009, a joint-venture between GM and DRB-HICOM called Hicomobil, marketed the Chevrolet Aveo, Chevrolet Optra, Chevrolet Nabira and Chevrolet Lumina. The joint venture was ended and Naza was taking over Chevrolet's dealership as Naza Quest Sdn Bhd in 2010. The lineup of Chevrolet cars available were Chevrolet Sonic, Chevrolet Cruze, Chevrolet Malibu, Chevrolet Captiva, Chevrolet Orlando and Chevrolet Colorado.

In 2018, Naza Quest Sdn Bhd ceased to distribute new Chevrolet vehicles in Malaysia, but continues to provide warranty support and aftersales service for existing Chevrolet customers.

==== Middle East ====
In the Middle East, Chevrolet-badged cars, trucks, SUVs, and crossovers are sourced from GM Korea (in South Korea) and GM in North America. Formerly, some models were sourced from GM Holden in Australia. The Middle Eastern market has a separate division called Chevrolet Special Vehicles, which (as of December 2007) sourced the high-performance 400 bhp (300 kW) CR8 sedan from Holden Special Vehicles. The Holden Commodore was badged as the Chevrolet Lumina in the Middle East, as well as South Africa. The longer wheelbase Holden Caprice was sold as the Chevrolet Caprice in the Middle East. The Middle East fleet (particularly Saudi Arabia) includes the likes of the Groove, Captiva, Blazer, Tahoe, and Traverse in the SUV/crossover category, and the Silverado in the truck category. Previously, the Cruze, Malibu, Sonic, and Avalanche, among other models, were offered in the Middle East.

==== Pakistan ====
In Pakistan, Chevrolet introduced its cars in collaboration with a local automobile manufacturer called Nexus Automotive. The lineup from Chevrolet Pakistan included the Chevrolet Optra, Chevrolet Spark, Chevrolet Joy, Chevrolet Aveo, Chevrolet Cruze, and Chevrolet Colorado.

==== Philippines ====
Chevrolet has been in the Philippines for a long time, assembling the Chevrolet Bel-Air, Chevrolet Impala, Chevrolet Malibu and even the 1st generation Chevrolet Camaro by the Yutivo family-owned General Motors plant. Other than Chevrolets, the plant also assembled Opels, Pontiacs, Holdens, Buicks, and Vauxhalls for the Filipino market.

GM withdrew from the Philippines in 1985 and returned in 2000. During Chevrolet's absence in the market, many cars like the Chevrolet Suburban and the Chevrolet Astro have been imported new in the country via grey-market and sold to retailers.

Chevrolet's current Philippine operations are under the control of The Covenant Car Company Inc. The company was officially incorporated on July 1, 2009 and assumed business operations on October 1, 2009. There are at least 24 dealerships around the country as of 2020. Its current lineup include the Chevrolet Spark, Chevrolet Sail, Chevrolet Cruze, Chevrolet Malibu, Chevrolet Colorado, Chevrolet Trax, Chevrolet Trailblazer, Chevrolet Suburban, and the Chevrolet Tahoe.

In 2018, the Corvette was added to the roster, making it the most expensive vehicle in the lineup. It is legally imported, as the government has seized and destroyed expensive vehicles that were bought into the country illegally. In 2019, the Camaro returned to the Philippines with a 2.0-liter turbo engine at 275 hp and 398Nm to compete with the Ford Mustang ever since it was introduced in 2010.

==== South Korea ====
Many global-market Chevrolet vehicles are designed and manufactured by GM Korea of South Korea, but they had been sold under the Daewoo Motors brand in South Korea until February 2011. The Daewoo brand was fully replaced by Chevrolet in March 2011. All Daewoo products relaunched under the Chevrolet brand, with the release of the Chevrolet Camaro, Chevrolet Orlando and Chevrolet Aveo. In 2015, the Impala was added to the lineup as Chevrolet began importing the American-built sedan to South Korea for the first time. In 2018, Gunsan plant was shut down on May 31 and VIDAMCO plant in Hanoi, Vietnam was sold by Vinfast in June. Chevrolet Cruze and Chevrolet Orlando was discontinued on May 31. Also Chevrolet Captiva discontinued in July 2018. Their best-selling vehicle is Chevrolet Spark and Chevrolet Malibu.

==== Thailand ====
The American-built Chevrolet Colorado pickup is also manufactured in Rayong, Thailand. Starting in 2003, the Holden Commodore was badged as the Chevrolet Lumina in Thailand for the VY and VZ model series. Exports lasted until 2005.

General Motors is currently exploring cost-cutting options as part of its restructuring plan. One of these options involves expanding the Rayong, Thailand plant to add additional capacity to export Colorados to the US. This would allow the Shreveport, Louisiana plant to be closed (where the Colorado is also produced). This scenario is plausible only if a free-trade agreement is signed between the U.S. and Thailand, as the American tariff on imported pickup trucks from non-FTA countries is currently 25%. The United Auto Workers is the most vocal opponent to a change in the tariff structure.

In addition to the Colorado pickup trucks, General Motors began assembling Chevrolet Captiva sport utility vehicle in its Rayong plant during June 2007. The Thai-assembled Captiva is based on THETA platform under the program code C100. Also produced at the General Motors' Rayong plant are the Chevrolet Aveo (launched in September 2009 under the platform T100) and Chevrolet Cruze (launched in November 2010 under the platform GLOBAL DELTA).

Chevrolet stopped selling its vehicles throughout Thailand in 2020, and sold the Rayong plant to Great Wall. Aftermarket sales, repairs and warranties will be honored for its Thai customers through authorized shops.

==== Uzbekistan ====
UzAuto Motors (formerly GM Uzbekistan and Uz-DaewooAuto) is an automotive manufacturer owned by the Government of Uzbekistan. It is based in Asaka, Uzbekistan. It manufactures vehicles under the marques Chevrolet and Ravon, for domestic sales and export. GM Uzbekistan was partly owned (25%) by General Motors and, in 2019, it was acquired by the Government of Uzbekistan and renamed UzAuto Motors.

General Motors Uzbekistan, or GM Uzbekistan, became the new name of Uz-Daewoo Auto in March 2008 as part of a new joint venture owned by Uzavtosanoat JSC (75%) and General Motors Corporation (25%) with a factory in Asaka producing a variety of Chevrolet models. In the 2010s, the Damas (N150), Matiz (M150), Nexia (N150), Spark (M300), Epica, Malibu, and Captiva were assembled at the plant.

=== Australia ===
Even though the Australian market of today mainly consists of Australia's own automotive companies alongside European and Asian automobile brands, Australia once had its fair share of American cars as well.

Bodies for the local assembly of Chevrolets were built in Australia as early as 1918 and by 1926 the newly created General Motors (Australia) Pty Ltd had established assembly plants in five Australian states to produce Chevrolet and other GM vehicles using bodies supplied by Holden Motor Body Builders.

The merger of General Motors (Australia) Pty Ltd with the troubled Holden Motor Body Builders in 1931 saw the creation of General Motors-Holden and the ongoing production of various GM products including Chevrolet. GMH departed from traditional US body styles with the release of the Chevrolet Coupe Utility in 1934 and the Chevrolet "Sloper" Coupe in 1935. Post-war production recommenced in 1946. From 1949 Australian Chevrolets were to be locally assembled from components imported from Chevrolet in Canada although local production of the Coupe Utility body continued until 1952. 1968 was the last full year of Chevrolet assembly in Australia.

Classic Chevrolet models such as Bel Air, Biscayne, Impala etc., are still found in many states around Australia. From the early 1970s to the early 1980s the Chevrolet name was also used on various light commercials in Australia. These ranged from the LUV (a rebadged Isuzu KB) to the third-generation C-series trucks. From 1998 to 2001 the Chevrolet Suburban was sold in Australia as the Holden Suburban, which is expected to return under the Chevrolet badge with the twelfth generation models.

Chevrolet and Holden share a number of models and model names including Malibu, Caprice, Colorado, Volt, Spark/Barina Spark, Sonic/Barina, Cruze, Equinox, and VF Commodore/Chevrolet SS. The Holden Commodore (VF) was exported from Australia to the United States as the Chevrolet SS until Holden ended production in May 2017 during its transition to a distribution platform of vehicles that are sourced from GM's American and international plants that is expected to badge as Holden vehicles.

In 2018, the Chevrolet brand returned to Australia and New Zealand with the launch of the Camaro 2SS Coupe and the Silverado 2500HD/3500HD. These vehicles retained the Chevrolet badge and nameplate, and converted to RHD in Australia. In addition to the relaunch, Holden Special Vehicles added the Camaro and Silverado to their performance lineup.

With the Holden brand retired in 2021, GM continues to export Chevrolet models to the region under the "General Motors Specialty Vehicles" network, in order to expand more American models in that region. The imported Silverado pickup trucks are re-manufactured as right-hand-drive vehicles in Australia before distribution. Chevrolet is also looking at making the Camaro part of the V8 Supercar Series in 2023, where it would succeed the Holden ZB Commodore after its contracts with both Holden and the teams involved with the series expire in 2022.

In Australia and New Zealand Chevrolets are often called Chevs as well as Chevys.

=== South Africa ===
External audio
- 1974 Braaivleis, rugby, sunny skies and Chevrolet advert at the Springbok Radio preservation society.

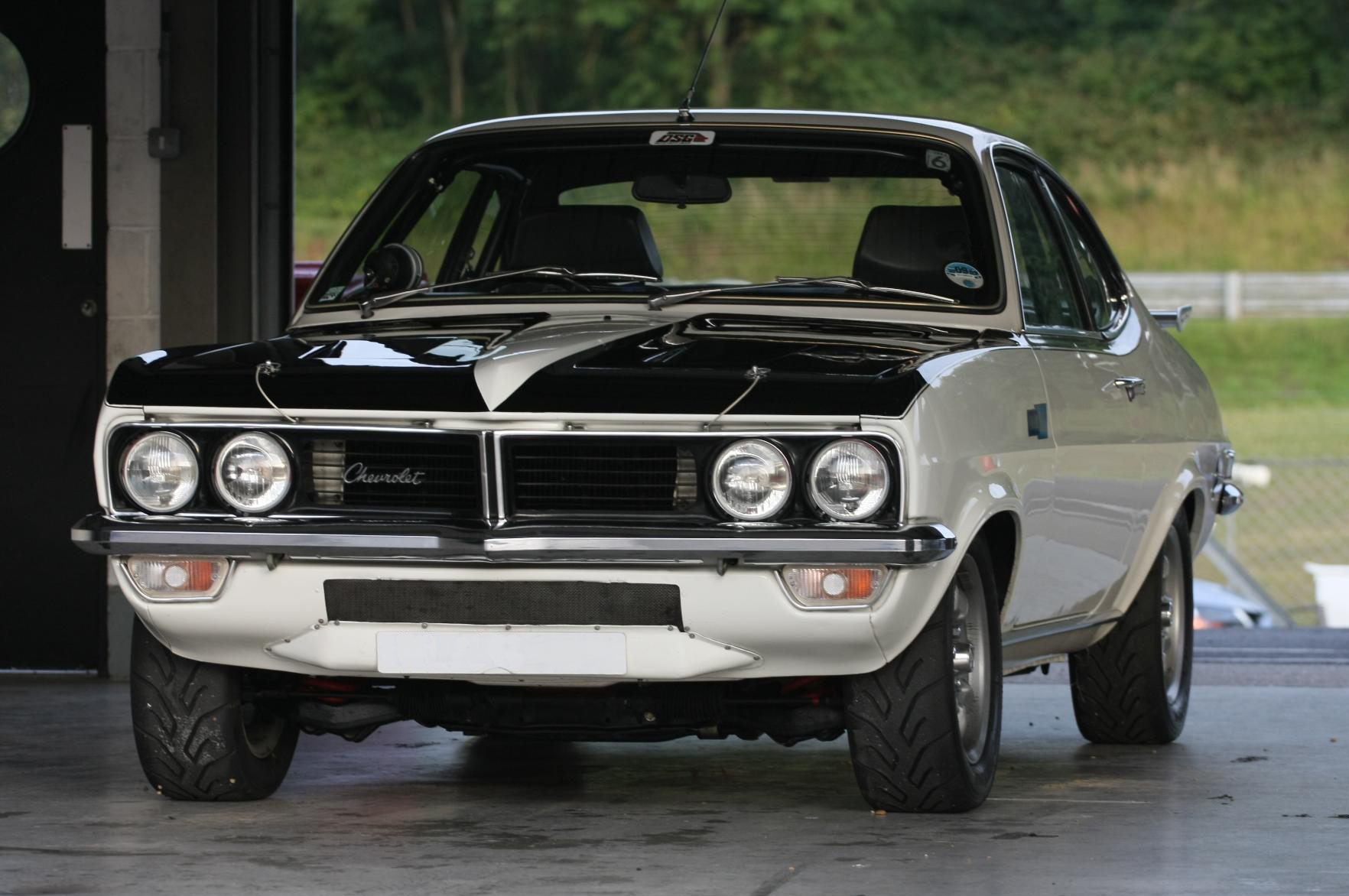
Chevrolet Firenza CanAm 302, South African homologation special

In South Africa, Chevrolet was GM's main brand name until 1982, with a number of Vauxhall Motors and Holden derivatives being built under the Chevy name from 1965. In the 1970s, the advertising jingle "braaivleis, rugby, sunny skies and Chevrolet" (adapted from the US "Baseball, Hot Dogs, Apple Pies and Chevrolet") came to epitomise the ideal lifestyle of white male South Africans. Holden in Australia used the jingle "Football, Meat Pies, Kangaroos and Holden cars". Originally, Chevrolets were CKD kits of US models assembled in their plant in Port Elizabeth. However, since South Africa was right-hand drive and the US was left-hand drive, along with encouragement by the South African government to use local content, Chevrolets such as the Biscayne were eventually made entirely in South Africa, along with GM's "own car for South Africa": the Ranger.

By the 1970s, larger South African Chevrolets were based on Australian General Motors-Holden's models, the Kommando being based on the Holden Kingswood and the Constantia on the Statesman, while the smaller Firenza was based on the Vauxhall Viva. The Chevrolet Nomad sold in South Africa was entirely different from the Nomad sold in the US; whereas the American Nomad was originally conceived as a station wagon version of the Corvette and eventually became the station wagon version of the Bel Air, the South African Nomad was an SUV of truck proportions before SUVs were popular. Due to local content laws the cars usually received different engines than in their home markets.

However, these were replaced by Opel models like the Rekord, Commodore, and Senator, and in 1982 the Chevrolet brand name was dropped in favour of Opel. Because of the political climate at the time, GM decided to divest from South Africa in 1986, and a local group eventually bought out GM's South African operations (including the Port Elizabeth plant) and renamed the company Delta Motor Corporation, which concentrated on Opels, Isuzus, and Suzukis, built under licence.

However, thanks to an improved political climate in the 1990s, GM decided to reenter South Africa, eventually buying out the whole of Delta. In 2001, the Chevrolet name made a comeback, used on the Lumina, a rebadged Holden Commodore, and later on, on the Daewoo range of cars. Current Chevrolets (2013) include the Spark Lite (a rebadged Daewoo Matiz), Spark (a third-generation Matiz based on the 2007 Chevrolet Beat), Aveo Sedan and Hatch, the Sonic Sedan and Hatch (the second generation Aveo), Cruze Sedan and Hatch (underpinned by the front-wheel drive GM Delta II platform), the Lumina Sedan (including the Ute model), the Chevrolet Orlando (a five-door, seven-seat compact MPV manufactured by GM Korea under the Chevrolet division for worldwide markets), the Chevrolet Captiva a mid-size sport utility vehicle (SUV) developed by GM Daewoo (now GM Korea) the South Korean subsidiary of General Motors (GM) and sold under the Chevrolet brand, the Chevrolet TrailBlazer (a mid-size sport utility vehicle produced by the Chevrolet division of American automaker General Motors and based on a pickup truck chassis in this case the 2012 Chevrolet Colorado), and a pick-up version which was previously based on the Opel Corsa known as the Corsa Ute; but the current model which in collaboration with GM Brazil who developed it, is the Chevrolet Utility which is based on the Chevrolet Agila platform (a vehicle developed in Brazil and built in Argentina).

In 2017, GM withdrew from South Africa, with its truck division and its plant changing hands to Isuzu while at the same time ending all sales and the dealership network of the Chevrolet brand. GM worked with both Isuzu and PSA Group (who had bought Opel from GM that year) to ensure existing customers receive parts and technical support during and after the company exit the country.

=== Europe ===
Until 2005, Chevrolet Europe sold a few models, mostly United States domestic market (USDM) models modified to suit European regulations. Among them were the Chevrolet Alero (which was a rebadged Oldsmobile Alero) and the Chevrolet Trans Sport (which was a Chevrolet Venture with the front end of the Pontiac Trans Sport). Among other models sold were the Camaro, the Corsica/Beretta, the Corvette, the Blazer, and the TrailBlazer. North American–built Chevrolet Impala V8 sedans have also been available in Europe in recent years, marketed as both large family sedans and more economically priced alternatives as high-performance executive cars.

From 2005 all models from GM Daewoo were rebranded as Chevrolet in Europe. In the rest of the world, most Daewoo models have worn the Chevrolet badge since 2003. Exceptions include the use of the Suzuki badge in the United States and Canada, the Pontiac badge in Canada, the Holden badge in Australia and New Zealand, and the Buick badge in China.

During the mid-2000s, the Corvette and Cadillac range were marketed in Europe through a separate distribution channel operated by Netherlands-based Kroymans Corporation Group but following its bankruptcy in 2010, General Motors established a new Swiss based subsidiary to relaunch Chevrolet in Europe and add the Corvette, Camaro and Malibu models to the European range.

From the beginning of 2016, General Motors reduced its presence in Europe only to its iconic models, such as the Corvette, in order to strengthen its Opel and Vauxhall brands. Although announcing that they will maintain a broad presence in Russia and the Commonwealth of Independent States, General Motors later reduced their line-up to the iconic models in Russia, and more, the Opel division also exited the Russian market in 2015, while also abandoning production at their Saint Petersburg plant. As of March 2016, only the US-built Corvette Stingray and Tahoe, as well as the Russian-built Niva, were being offered on the Russian market.

Chevrolet sales in Western and Central Europe (Note: Including Southeastern Europe, Turkey and Iceland, excluding Belarus, Ukraine and Moldova.) ranged around 200,000 units per year since 2005, peaking at 216,160 units in 2007, while the market share achieved its highest of 1.28 percent in 2012. In Russia, sales grew constantly over the same period, from 67,000 units in 2005 to 205,040 units in 2012, Chevrolet holding a market share of 6.84 percent and being the top import car brand. In 2012, the top markets for Chevrolet in Europe, by the number of registrations, were Italy (31,150), Germany (29,694), France (24,613), Turkey (18,492) and Spain (15,165). The best selling model during the same year was the Aveo (54,800), followed by the Spark (47,600) and the Cruze (40,500).

Currently, as of 2022, only the Corvette Stingray is available in most countries in Europe. In the Commonwealth of Independent States countries where Chevrolet vehicles are officially sold, the vehicles are mostly or wholly sourced from Uzbekistan-based UzAuto Motors, a former General Motors-Uzbekistan joint venture. UzAuto Motors is now a state-owned enterprise with a license to assemble and sell Chevrolet-branded vehicles in several CIS member nations. Chevrolet vehicles are also assembled in Kazakhstan from semi-knocked-down kits supplied by UzAuto Motors.

==== Poland ====
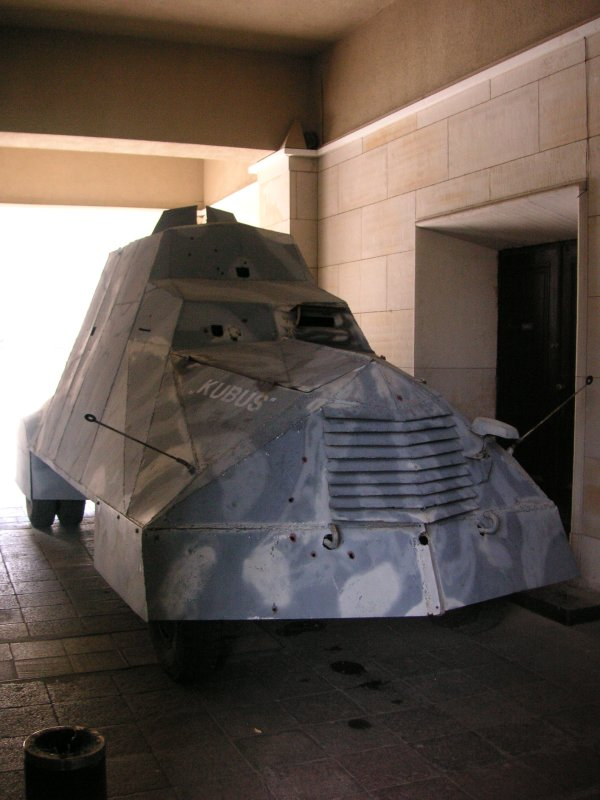
Kubuś – insurgent armored car in Warsaw Uprising on the chassis of a civilian Chevrolet 157 truck

During World War II in Poland, the Home Army of the Polish resistance movement built an improvised armoured car – Kubuś which was based on the chassis of a civilian Chevrolet 157 truck, license-built in pre-war Poland by the Lilpop, Rau i Loewenstein company. The car was used against the German army in Warsaw during the Warsaw Uprising in 1944. The damaged Kubuś survived the war and in 1945 was towed to the Polish Army Museum where it is currently on exhibition. A full-scale operational replica was created in 2004 by Juliusz Siudziński and is, as of 2009, on exhibition at the Warsaw Uprising Museum.

Between the autumn of 2007 and the beginning of 2011, the Chevrolet Aveo was produced at the FSO plant in Warsaw, in collaboration with the Ukrainian company UkrAVTO, in both hatchback and sedan body styles. Between 2005 and 2014 GM sold some 60,000 cars under Chevrolet brand that represented 0.5–1% market share compere to Opel's 7% market share each year.

==== Russia ====
GM-AvtoVAZ was a joint venture between GM and the Russian company AvtoVAZ established in 2001, which produced the Chevrolet Niva, an SUV especially designed for the Russian market and conditions. The venture ended in December 2019, after AvtoVAZ acquired all General Motors' stake in it. General Motors also operated the GM Avto factory, located in Saint Petersburg and opened in 2008. It was upgraded in 2012 and has produced the Opel Antara and Chevrolet Captiva SUVs, the Chevrolet Cruze from late 2009, and the TrailBlazer from semi-knocked down kits. It ceased production in July 2015, before Chevrolet's exit from the Russian market at the end of the year. In collaboration with the Russian company GAZ, the second generation Chevrolet Aveo was produced at the plant in Nizhny Novgorod for the Russian market, starting from the beginning of 2013, until 2015. Chevrolet vehicles were also produced at the Avtotor plant, located in Kaliningrad. The models produced here were the Lacetti, Aveo, Epica, Captiva, Orlando and Tahoe. As of December 2017, the Chevrolet Tahoe, Chevrolet Camaro, Chevrolet Corvette, and Chevrolet Niva were officially available for sale in Russia. In the first quarter of 2022, there were two distinct sales channels in Russia for Chevrolet vehicles. The first, operated by General Motors, sold the Tahoe and the Trailblazer. The second sales channel sold economical mass-market Chevrolet-branded vehicles assembled by UzAuto Motors in Uzbekistan. Both sales channels stopped selling Chevrolet vehicles in Russia in April 2022 due to U.S. and South Korean sanctions resulting from the Russo-Ukrainian War.

=== South America ===
Historically, many Latin American-market vehicles from GM were modified derivatives of older models from GM's North American and European operations. The current S-10 and Blazer exemplify this strategy. However, more modern vehicles are now being marketed as market conditions change and competition increases. Besides those older models made in Mexico, Ecuador, Colombia, and Mercosur countries, Korean-sourced cars from former Daewoo factories in some markets also get Korean- and U.S.-made Chevrolets on top of their local line-ups.

==== Argentina ====
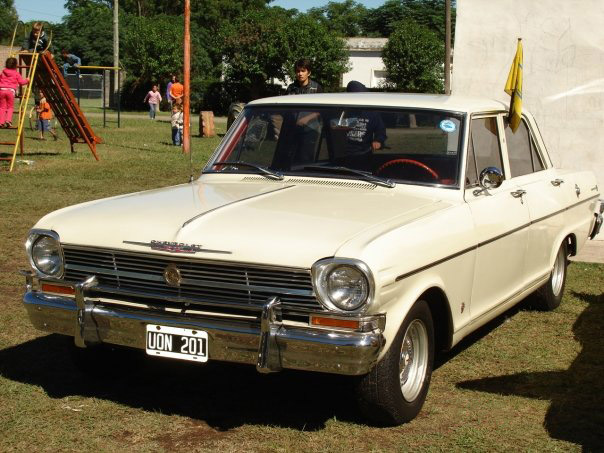
Chevrolet 400, made in Argentina from 1962 to 1974

In 1924, General Motors de Argentina, the local GM subsidiary, started importing Chevrolet Double Phaeton models which were welcomed with great demand. In 1925, in order to reduce costs in the Argentine market, General Motors decided to manufacture in Argentina and started producing a sedan, a roadster, a truck chassis and the Chevrolet Double Phaeton, now called "Especial Argentino", a model exclusively designed for the Argentine market. Sales increased and soon the Oldsmobile, Oakland and Pontiac units were incorporated to the assembly line.

When the Second World War broke out the operations were complicated. In 1941 the Chevrolet number 250,000 was made, but the shortage of products made car production impossible. The last Chevrolet went out of the plant in August 1942. In order to avoid the total stoppage, the company made electrical and portable refrigerators and car accessories amongst other items. After the war, GM started producing the Oldsmobile and Pontiac lines and later Chevrolet was added.

In 1959, manufacturing plants are enlarged and set up to produce cars, pick-ups and trucks. On January 25, 1960, the first Argentine Chevrolet pick-up was introduced. The following year the national government approves the investment plan for 45 million dollars which included a plant of 12,000 m^{2}. On March 12, 1962, the first Chevrolet 400 was made based on the North American Chevy II. The original plan considered a national integration of 50% during the first year of production; this amount had to be 90% in 1964 with a production of 15,000 units. By 1969, the Chevy line, derived from the American Chevy Nova, was presented.

In the middle of the seventies, General Motors market share was reduced sharply from 9% in 1976 to 2% in 1978. Losses exceeded $30 million and the head company in the USA decided to halt production activities in Argentina.

The Chevrolet trademark reappeared in 1985 for the production of the pick-up in its versions C-20 and D-20. In 1995, a plan for the manufacturing destined for export specially to Brazil and other countries of Mercosur materialized with the building of a new facility near Rosario, Santa Fe, for the production of the Opel-based Chevrolet Corsa and the Suzuki-based Chevrolet Grand Vitara 4x4.

By 2010, the range was based on a variety of GM Korea based cars, together with the Brazilian Chevrolet Prisma.

==== Brazil ====
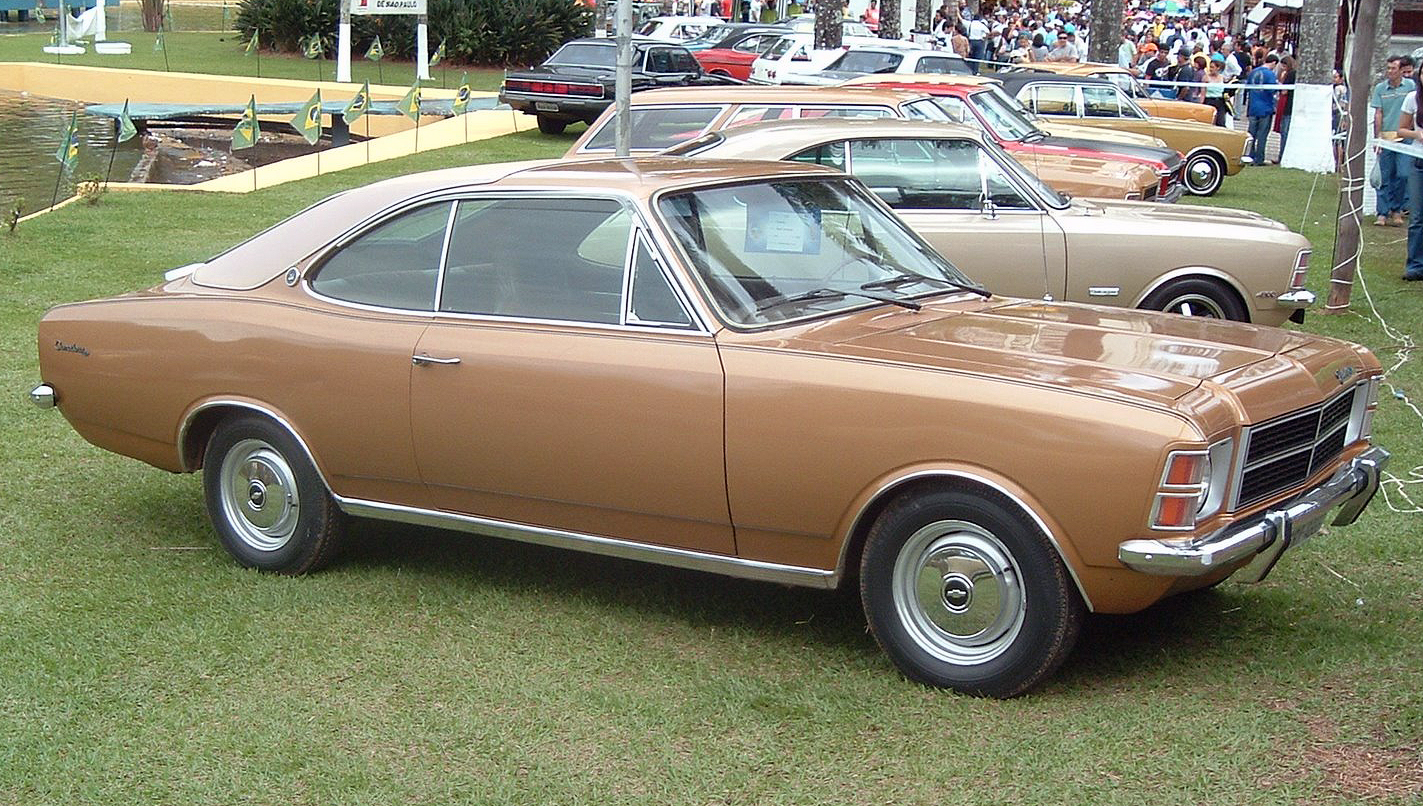
Chevrolet Opala

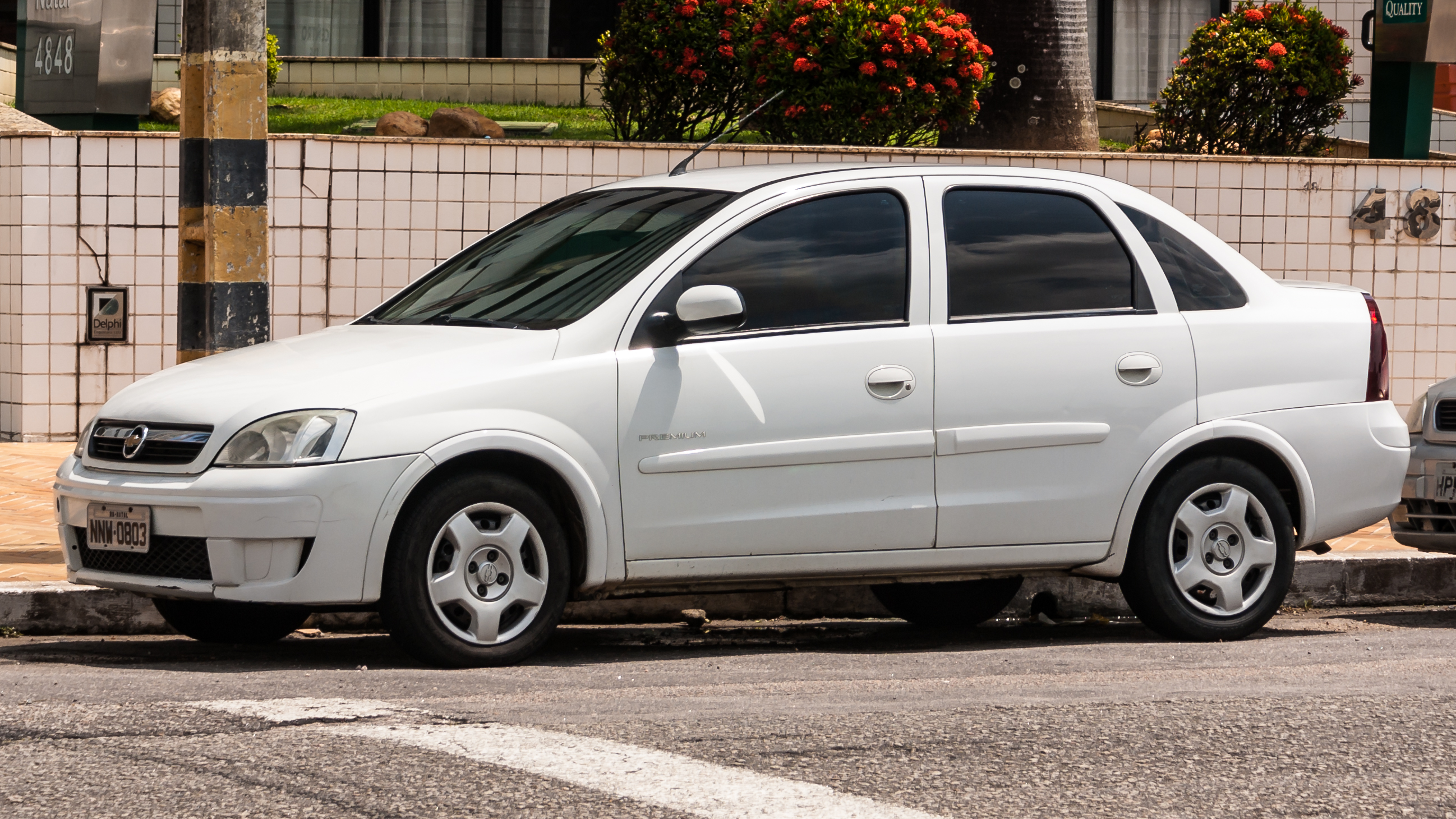
Chevrolet Corsa sedan

In Brazil, the Chevrolet Opala was based on the German Opel Rekord and American Chevrolet Nova from the late 1960s, continuing in production until the early 1990s, when it was replaced by a version of the Opel Omega. The basic version had a 151 four-cylinder engine with 82 hp and 143.2 lb-ft. The top-of-the-line version was called Opala SS and used the GM engine 250-S inline six-cylinder and possessed solid lifters with 171 hp and 278.5 lb-ft, which led to the record-breaking South American speed road cars in 1976, with 118.36 mph (190.47 km/h), beating the Puma GTB (which also used the GM 250 engine inline six-cylinder, but without solid lifters) and the Brazilian version of the Dodge Charger R / T 318 and Ford Maverick V8 302 quadrijet. Other smaller Chevrolets in Brazil, such as the Kadett and Monza, were based on the Opel Kadett and Ascona respectively.

Chevrolet's product line-up in Brazil comprised some exclusive designs like the Corsa "B" based Celta, which was sold in Argentina under the Suzuki brand, the Astra, and a Brazilian-designed Vectra based on the Opel Astra H. The passenger car range currently includes the Cruze, the Captiva, the Agile hatchback, Chevrolet Onix. The latest home-grown product is the Chevrolet Prisma MKII, released in 2013.

Utility and four-wheel drive vehicles line-up includes the S-10, the Blazer, and the Montana. The Montana is a compact pickup truck, based on the Agile, that is also sold in other Latin American markets. From the 1960s to the mid-1980s, there was also a large station wagon, derived from the C10 truck (somewhat similar to the Suburban), called the Veraneio.

==== Chile ====
Chile has a mix of Chevrolet models from different GM brands and platforms branded as Chevrolet. The models come from Chevrolet USA, GM Korea, Mexico, India and other origins. Chevrolet production in Chile began in 1962, although at first through local partners (in this case, Avayu with the Nova II). The Chevrolet C/K truck was manufactured in Chile between 1975–88.

==== Ecuador ====
Chevrolet has been operating in Ecuador for 80 years. GM Ecuador sells US Chevrolets alongside GM Korea sourced models. It also sells the 1983 Suzuki Supercarry under the Chevrolet name, and the Isuzu Rodeo was sold as the Chevrolet Rodeo throughout the 1990s.

==== Venezuela ====
In Venezuela, Chevrolet has been operating since 1948, when truck production began in Caracas. In 1979 production moved to a plant in Valencia that was purchased from Chrysler. Chevrolet assembled more than 1,500,000 vehicles in its first 50 years in Venezuela.

==== Colombia ====
The Colombian Automotive Factory SA (Colmotores) was founded in 1956 and initially produced vehicles in Austin; in the 1960s, Simca and Dodge automobiles (its first car manufactured was a Coronet 440); and then, in 1980, began producing Chevrolet cars. Currently, Colmotores has more than 75% of the domestic market, with models from GM Korea and Suzuki. Particularly worthy of mention is the Aveo, Optra and the Spark. In 2024, General Motors ended all manufacturing operations in Colombia and shuttered its Colmotores factory in the country alongside the OBB factory in Ecuador due to Colombia's economic downturn caused by very high inflation and interest rates and due to the Colmotores factory only being active at 9%. Despite this, General Motors will continue to sell new Chevrolet vehicles in Colombia, imported from GM's factories in other countries.

==== Trinidad and Tobago ====
Since the early 1920s, Chevrolet cars and trucks were marketed in this country. The Master Deluxe Sedan of the late 1930s was considered to be a pinnacle of luxury. All cars sold through the local dealer, Neal and Massey (also franchisee for Vauxhall and Buick), were right-hand-drive, and imported from Canada and Australia. Throughout the 1940s and 1950s, GM maintained a market presence with the Bel Air, Impala and Fleetline. During the late 1960s and early 1970s, Australian Holden DeVilles badged as Chevrolet Caprices were sold, though a few "Islander" limited edition American Chevrolet Caprices were imported. Neal and Massey gave up the GM franchise in 1974 and the brand left the market.

During the period 1998–2001, Southern Sales Ltd. imported the Chevy Monza and Joy. Based on the Opel Corsa platform and assembled in Mexico, these were the cheapest new cars available. Poor build quality, unprofessional dealer service, and a limited spare parts supply saw these cars exit the market with only a few units being sold.

In 2003, the local Renault dealer marketed the Aveo sedan and hatchback, as well as the Optra sedan (a rebadged Suzuki Forenza), with limited success.

A more intensive marketing campaign by a subsequent Chevrolet dealer, Lifestyle Motors, met with moderately more success. The models available were the Chevrolet Colorado (Isuzu D-Max twin), Spark (micro-car based on the Daewoo Matiz), Aveo sedan and hatchback, Optra sedan, hatchback and wagon, the Captiva SUV, and the Epica large saloon. In March 2011, the Cruze was added to the lineup and features a 1.8 litre gasoline engine. It bridged the gap between Optra and Epica models. Once the Optra was phased out, a 1.6 litre Cruze was made available.

== Sport ==
Chevrolet enters a variety of cars in sporting events around the world and is particularly well known in NASCAR, IndyCar, and the FIA World Touring Car Championship.

=== NASCAR ===
Major teams include Hendrick Motorsports, Richard Childress Racing, and Trackhouse Racing Team, who all drive Chevrolet Camaro ZL1 1LE-branded cars. Hendrick has twelve championships, Childress has six championships, and former Chevrolet team Stewart–Haas Racing has two. Chevrolet is the most successful manufacturer to be involved in NASCAR with thirty-nine manufacturer's titles and the most recorded wins by a manufacturer. Previously, the Lumina, Monte Carlo, Impala, and the SS were used in both the NASCAR Cup Series and NASCAR O'Reilly Auto Parts Series.

Chevrolet teams in the NASCAR Cup Series currently use the Camaro ZL1 1LE, while Xfinity teams run the Camaro SS and NASCAR Craftsman Truck Series organizations race with the Silverado.

=== IndyCar ===
Chevrolet claimed six consecutive Indianapolis 500 wins from 1988 to 1993 and five consecutive CART Series championships from 1988 to 1992, with notable drivers such as Rick Mears, Al Unser Jr., Michael Andretti, Danny Sullivan, Arie Luyendyk, Emerson Fittipaldi, and Bobby Rahal.

Chevrolet replaced Oldsmobile as the General Motor brand at the IndyCar Series from 2002 to 2005. Hélio Castroneves won the Indianapolis 500 and Sam Hornish Jr. the championship, but the American brand had little success the next years.

Chevrolet returned to IndyCar in 2012. After several years of Honda being the only engine provider, Chevrolet rejoined the series in 2012. Major teams include Team Penske, KV Racing, Chip Ganassi Racing and CFH Racing who all use Chevy engines. Chevrolet won several races including the Indianapolis 500 in 2013, 2015, 2018–2019, 2023–2024, as well as seven drivers championships.

=== Tudor United SportsCar Championship ===
The Corvette runs in the GT LeMans class for Tudor United SportsCar Championship, which was, until 2014, the American Le Mans Series in the GT class, when ALMS merged with Grand-Am to form Tudor United SportsCar Championship. Corvette Racing started in 1999 at the Daytona 24-hour race and has since won eight consecutive ALMS GT1 manufacturers and team championships and seven ALMS GT1 drivers' titles. The Corvette also takes part in the French 24 Hours of Le Mans race.

=== FIA World Touring Car Championship ===
In 2005, when the Chevrolet brand was re-launched in Europe, Chevrolet took part in the WTCC with a version of the Lacetti, developed by the UK-based Ray Mallock Ltd (RML). In 2009 the Cruze replaced the Lacetti and won the Drivers' and Manufacturers' championship from 2010 to 2012.

=== British Touring Car Championship ===
Chevrolet participated in the British Touring Car Championship with the Cruze between 2010 and 2011.

=== British football ===
In May 2012, Chevrolet replaced Audi as the official automotive sponsor of the English football team Manchester United. From the start of the 2014–15 season Chevrolet became the team's principal shirt sponsor. The deal is contracted to run for seven years, worth a world-record $560 million USD.

In July 2012, Chevrolet and English Premier League football team Liverpool F.C. announced a four-year partnership that made Chevrolet the official automotive partner of the club. The deal ended two years prematurely, in 2014, following GM pulling the Chevrolet brand out of Europe. GM's subsidiary in the UK, Vauxhall Motors, took over from Chevrolet as the club's automotive sponsor.

=== Racecars ===
Year	Vehicle	Image	Category
1959	Chevrolet Impala		NASCAR Gen 1
1966	Chevrolet Corvair		Group 2
1967	Chevrolet Camaro		Group 2
1967	Chevrolet Chevelle		NASCAR Gen 2
1967	Chevrolet Malibu		NASCAR Gen 2
1971	Chevrolet Corvette		IMSA GTO
1971	Chevrolet Monte Carlo		NASCAR Gen 2
1973	Chevrolet Chevelle Laguna		NASCAR Gen 2
1976	Chevrolet Monza		Group 5
1977	Chevrolet Monza		IMSA GTO
1979	Chevrolet Camaro Z28		Group C
1980	Chevrolet Corvette C2 Sting Ray		IMSA GTO
1980	Chevrolet Corvette C3		IMSA GTO
1980	Chevrolet Nova		IMSA GTO
1981	Chevrolet Malibu		NASCAR Gen 3
1981	Chevrolet Monte Carlo		NASCAR Gen 3
1984	Chevrolet Corvette GTP		IMSA GTP
1987	Chevrolet Opala		Stock Car Brazil
1988	Chevrolet Corvette C4		IMSA GTO
1989	Chevrolet Lumina		NASCAR Gen 3
1990	Chevrolet Opala		Stock Car Brazil
1991	Chevrolet Corvette ZR-1		IMSA GTO
1992	Chevrolet Lumina		NASCAR Gen 4
1994	Chevrolet Omega		Stock Car Brazil
1995	Chevrolet C/K		NASCAR Truck
1995	Chevrolet Monte Carlo		NASCAR Gen 4
1998	Chevrolet Silverado		NASCAR Truck
2000	Chevrolet Vectra		Stock Car Brazil
2001	Chevrolet Corvette LM-GT (C5)		LM GTE
2004	Chevrolet Astra		Stock Car Brazil
2006	Chevrolet Corvette C6.R		Group GT1
2006	Chevrolet Monte Carlo SS		NASCAR Gen 4
2007	Chevrolet Corvette Z06.R GT3		Group GT3
2007	Chevrolet Impala SS		NASCAR CoT
2008	Chevrolet Corvette C6 GT4		SRO GT4
2008	Chevrolet Cruze		Super 2000
2009	Chevrolet Corvette		TA
2009	Chevrolet Corvette ZR1 C6.R		LM GTE
2009	Chevrolet Impala		NASCAR Gen 4
2009	Chevrolet Vectra		Stock Car Brazil
2010	Chevrolet Callaway Corvette Z06.R GT3		Group GT3
2010	Chevrolet Camaro SS GT4		SRO GT4
2010	Chevrolet Impala		NASCAR CoT
2010	Chevrolet Impala		Xfinity Car of Tomorrow
2011	Chevrolet Camaro		TA2
2012	Chevrolet Camaro GT3		Group GT3
2012	Chevrolet Corvette DP		Daytona Prototype
2012	Chevrolet Sonic		Stock Car Brazil
2013	Chevrolet Camaro SS		Xfinity Car of Tomorrow
2013	Chevrolet SS		NASCAR Gen 6
2014	Chevrolet Corvette C7.R		LM GTE
2016	Chevrolet Callaway Corvette C7 GT3-R		Group GT3
2016	Chevrolet Cruze		Stock Car Brazil
2017	Chevrolet Camaro GT4.R		SRO GT4
2018	Chevrolet Camaro ZL1		NASCAR Gen 6
2020	Chevrolet Corvette C8.R		LM GTE
2022	Chevrolet Camaro ZL1		Next Gen NASCAR
2024	Chevrolet Corvette Z06 GT3.R		Group GT3
2025	Chevrolet Tracker		Stock Car Brazil

== Visual image ==
=== Chevrolet bowtie logo ===
The Chevrolet bowtie logo was introduced by company co-founder William C. Durant in late 1913. According to an official company publication titled The Chevrolet Story of 1961, the logo originated in Durant's imagination when, as a world traveler in 1908, he saw the pattern marching off into infinity as a design on wallpaper in a French hotel. He tore off a piece of the wallpaper and kept it to show friends, with the thought that it would make a good nameplate for a car. However, in an interview with Durant's widow, Catherine, published in a 1986 issue of Chevrolet Pro Management Magazine, Catherine recalled how she and her husband were on holiday in Hot Springs, Virginia, in 1912. While reading a newspaper in their hotel room, Durant spotted a design and exclaimed, "I think this would be a very good emblem for the Chevrolet." Unfortunately, at the time, Mrs. Durant didn't clarify what the motif was or how it was used. Ken Kaufmann, historian and editor of The Chevrolet Review, discovered in a November 12, 1911, edition of the Atlanta Constitution newspaper, an advertisement from the Southern Compressed Coal Company for "Coalettes", a refined fuel product for fires. The Coalettes logo, as published in the ad, had a slanted bowtie form, very similar to the shape that soon became the Chevrolet icon. The date of the paper was just nine days after the incorporation of the Chevrolet Motor Co. One other explanation attributes the design to a stylized version of the cross of the Swiss flag. Louis Chevrolet was born in Switzerland at La Chaux-de-Fonds, Canton of Neuchâtel, to French parents, on Christmas Day 1878. An October 2, 1913, edition of The Washington Post seems, so far, to be the earliest known example of the symbol being used to advertise the brand.

The first bowtie logo without embedded text first appeared in 1985, as part of the Heartbeat of America ad campaign. In 2004, Chevrolet began to phase-in the gold bowtie that serves as the brand identity for all of its cars and trucks marketed globally, where previously the logo was blue for passenger cars and gold for trucks.

=== Typography ===
The Klavika Condensed font was designed by type design studio Process Type Foundry under the art direction of Aaron Carámbula for General Motors marketer FutureBrand as part of Chevrolet's 2006 redesign. After the expiry of the exclusivity period, the commercial version of the font (Klavika Condensed) was released to the public in the fall of 2008. In the Young Creative Chevrolet corporate identity guidelines, Klavika is listed for use in all communication materials. Klavika was phased out beginning in 2012 and replaced by Knockout (from Hoefler & Frere-Jones) while the campaign was still ongoing. Currently, Goodby, Silverstein & Partners is utilizing the typeface families Louis, a group of simplified, legible grotesque gothics named after co-founder Louis Chevrolet, and Durant, a roman group, just as simplified and legible, named after co-founder William Durant, on print, television and Chevrolet's website advertisements.

=== 100th anniversary ===
As part of Chevrolet's 100th anniversary in 2011, a dedicated channel was created by the American internet based Pandora Radio station, playing the Top 100 songs mentioning the brand. Beginning on November 3, 2011, Chevrolet celebrated the countdown to its 100th birthday by encouraging its customers and fans to tell their Chevy stories, vote for their favorite Chevrolet cars and trucks, and take the birthday party to their communities with the help of Chevrolet and its dealers.

A feature-length documentary titled 'Chevy100, An American Story', produced by Roger Sherman, was premiered on November 3, 2011 at Detroit Institute of Arts in downtown Detroit, featuring drivers, collectors, restorers, racers, and journalists with a passion for cars and trucks. In honor of the 100th birthday of Chevrolet, Indianapolis Motor Speedway, Chevrolet and Indianapolis businessman David Ring have arranged to properly mark the grave of Arthur Chevrolet, brother of Chevrolet co-founder Louis Chevrolet.

=== Logo evolution ===
The logo through the years:

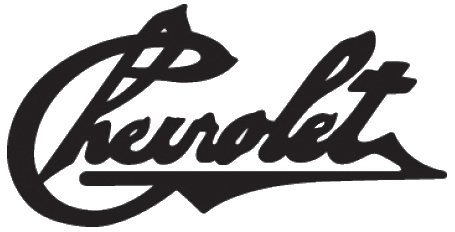
1911–13

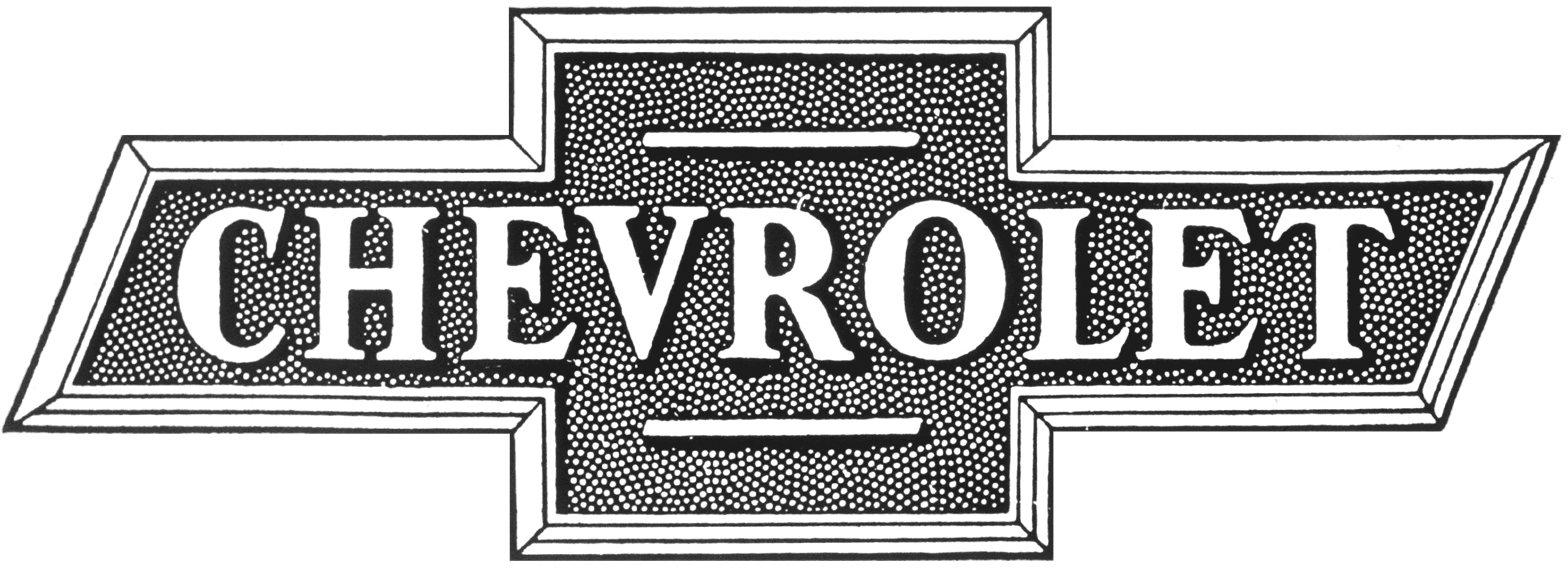
1913–14

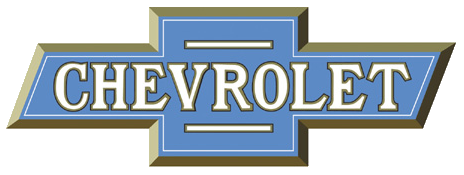
1914–34

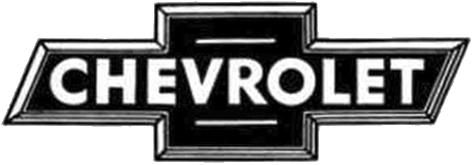
1934–40

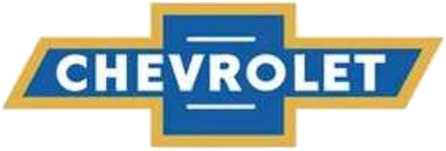
1940–50

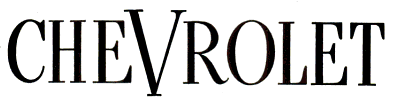
1943–45

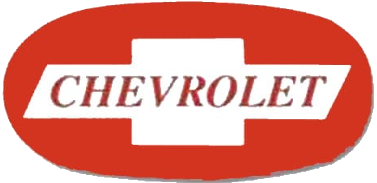
1950–64

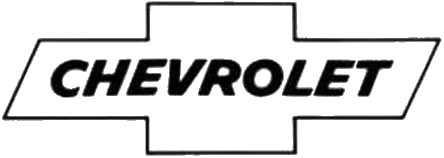
1964–76

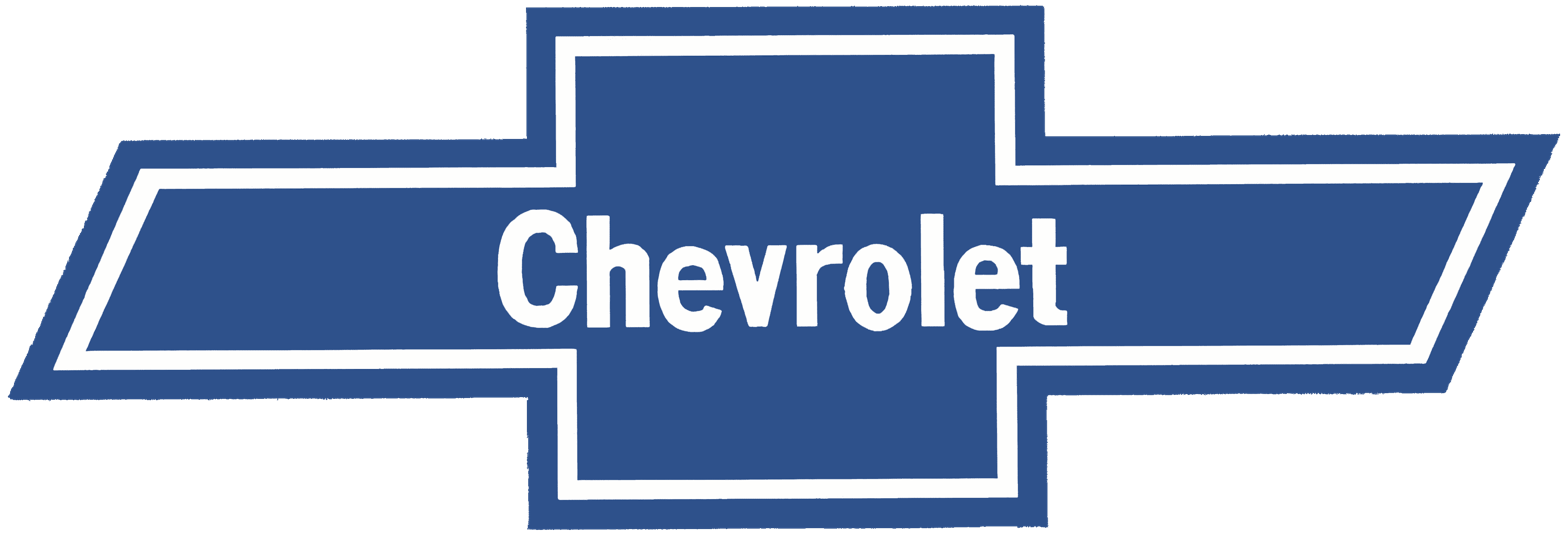
1976–88

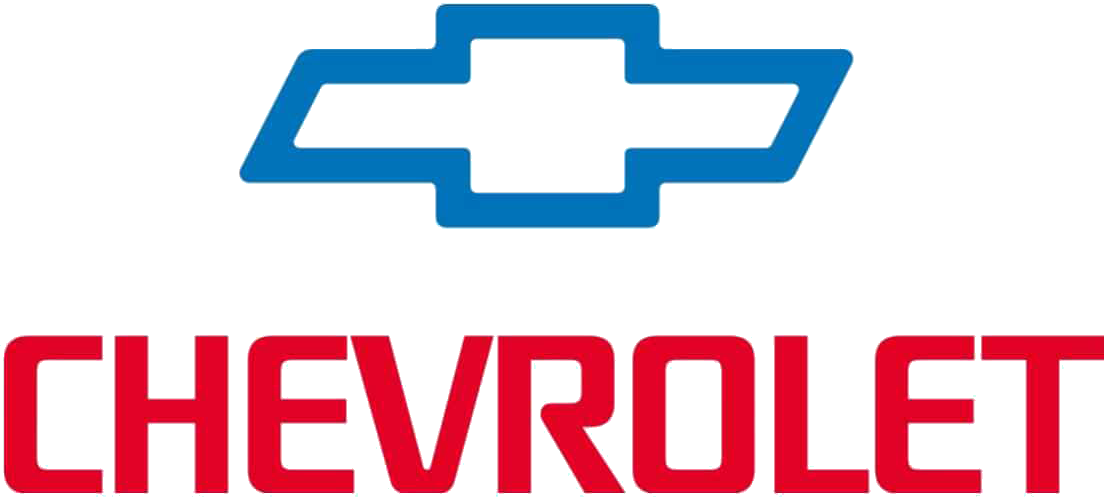
1988–2002

2023–24

== Marketing ==
=== Advertising ===
Earlier marketing efforts touted efficiency combined with savings – ("enormous buying power", 1914; "Quality at low cost", 1923, "A Six for the Price of a Four", 1929), interspersed with what could be described as "loftier" messages (positioning the automobile –and Chevy by extension—as "Man's conquest of time", 1923). Of the marketing campaigns from more recent decades, "See the U.S.A. in Your Chevrolet" (used in the 1950s and 1960s) was one of the longest lasting. In 1949, Chevy sponsored "Inside USA" on CBS; while this was a short-lived show, the tune created for it got new life in 1951, when Chevy began sponsoring the Dinah Shore show and Shore sang it at the close of every show.

A selection of Chevrolet's more recent marketing campaigns includes the following:

- 100-Hour Endurance and Economy Run (early 1920's)
- See the U.S.A. in Your Chevrolet (1950s–1960s)
- Putting you first keeps us first (1960s)
- It's Exciting! (mid-1960s)
- Building a better way to see the U.S.A. (early 1970s)
- Baseball, Hotdogs, Apple Pie & Chevrolet (1975; 2006)
- Now that's more like it (late 1970s)
- Chevy makes good things happen (1982)
- USA-1 Taking Charge (1983)
- Today's Chevrolet—Live It (1985)
- The Heartbeat of America (1987–1994)
- Rock, Flag and Eagle (1985–1987)
- From the country that invented Rock and roll (1993-1997; Chevrolet Camaro)
- Genuine Chevrolet (1994–1999)
- Tried, Tested, and True (1996–2004 in Canada)
- We'll Be There (1999–2004 in United States)
- Like a Rock (1991–2004; Chevrolet Trucks) Featuring the Bob Seger song of the same name
- An American Revolution (2004–2009)
- For All Life's Roads (2004–2006; Canada)
- Our Country, Our Truck (2006–2007; Chevrolet Trucks)
- America's Best Trucks (2007–present; Chevrolet Trucks)
- Let's Go (2007–2009; Canada)
- May the Best Car Win (2009–2010; United States and Canada)
- Excellence for Everyone (2010–present)
- Chevy Runs Deep (2010–2013; United States): A series of TV commercials were produced with Goodby, Silverstein and Partners, and was unveiled during the week of 2010 MLB World Series. Early commercials include 'Chevrolet: Anthem', 'Chevrolet: Dogs and Pickups', 'First Car', 'Chevrolet: Coming Home', 'Chevrolet Volt: Anthem', which positioned Chevy as a brand that is part of the American fabric in song, culture and in most of our pasts in one way or another.
- Chevrolet is the Car (2011–2012; South Korea, Japan)
- Driving Our World Forward/I'm proud (2011-; Canada): Chevrolet Sonic and Chevrolet Orlando ads were produced by Toronto-based production company Holiday Films. In Quebec, the brand introduced a new tag line: 'I'm proud'. The campaign included commercials in Mandarin, Cantonese, Tamil, Punjabi and Hindi languages. French version of the Antham ad also uses alternate slogan 'Chevrolet, et fier de l'être.' The fully integrated campaign includes TV, print and outdoor elements as well as extensive social media. The General Motors brand also held live events, including a concert in Toronto, presentations by parenting expert Nanny Robina and 'mompreneur' Erica Ehm, and a live yoga session. Mike Speranzini, director of advertising and communications for General Motors Canada, claimed that by leveraging the fact that Chevrolet is a global brand, consumers are seeing it in a more favourable light. Slogan in other languages include: 'Driving me (and) your world' (驅動你我的世界) (Mandarin Chinese, Cantonese Chinese)
- Love. Life. Chevrolet (2012–present; South Korea, Japan) As part of the Cruze campaign (in association with MacLaren McCann, Canada), outdoor vinyl materials, recycled seatbelts and bicycle inner tubes were made into messenger bags, laptop sleeves, and oversize totes.
- What do you #playfor (2012–present; Global Campaign): Chevrolet sponsors Manchester United replacing Aon as the shirt sponsor. The campaign slogan, "What do you #playfor?" attempts to engage users on social media. Chevrolet also launched multiple sites across the globe under the main Chevrolet Football Club website.
- Find New Roads (2013–; United States, Canada, Latin America): The slogan replaced the previous Chevy Runs Deep tag line, after Chevy Runs Deep campaign had been criticized as ineffectual. External applications of 'Find New Roads' was set to begin globally later in the first quarter of 2013. The first Find New Roads commercial, a 90-second commercial titled 'Dog & Doe' (produced by Commonwealth) featuring Chevrolet Volt, Spark, Sonic, Impala, Corvette Stingray, was premiered during 2013 Grammy Awards. The campaign was expected to cover 13 product launches for 2013 in the U.S. and 20 introductions throughout the world. In 2018, South Korea added a new slogan called "Find New Roads"+"다시 힘차게 달리다". Now they use "Find New Roads" again.
- Strong (2013-2019, Silverado Trucks): Using the Will Hoge song of the same name. Started with the launch of the 2014 Silverado in the summer of 2013.

==== Controversy over reliability claims ====
Chevrolet's advertisement promoting reliability has been pulled after recent backlash. In the advertisement (which is part of their "Real People. Not Actors" campaign), Chevrolet spokesperson Potsch Boyd claims that "based on a recent nationwide survey (by Ipsos), Chevy is more reliable than Toyota, Honda, and Ford." However, Chevrolet included a disclaimer stating that the survey was based on 2015 model year vehicles; several of these vehicles have been updated (facelifted and/or redesigned) since then. According to the Detroit Free Press and Detroit News, Ford, Honda and Toyota all challenged the accuracy of the claim. Furthermore, these claims were challenged by Consumer World, which noted that independent studies by J. D. Power and Consumer Reports contradicted them.

=== Marketing agency ===
FutureBrand, an Interpublic Group of Companies company, has been working with General Motors since 2000, who also involved the commissioning of a font that was later sold as Klavika Condensed, as part of re-design of Chevrolet in 2006.

In 2010, General Motors replaced the advertising agency Campbell Ewald, also of Interpublic Group of Companies, with Publicis Worldwide. Campbell-Ewald had served Chevrolet since 1919. In May 2010 Chevrolet's advertising account was awarded to Goodby, Silverstein and Partners.

As part of the attempt to attract 18- to 24-year-old drivers, General Motors hired MTV Scratch. Some of the collaboration results include Chevy ads showing their cars skydiving, bungee jumping, doing other stunts. The commercial was produced with consultations from students from UCLA, Pepperdyne and high schools. Some of the footage was later used in Chevrolet Sonic ad titled 'Stunt Anthem' during Super Bowl XLVI.

In March 2012, two competing agencies, San Francisco-based Goodby, Silverstein and Partners (part of Omnicom Group), and New York-based McCann Erickson Worldwide (part of Interpublic Group), joined to form an equal joint venture company called Commonwealth to handle most of Chevrolet's ads. Prior to the joint venture, Goodby, Silverstein and Partners performed marketing in the US, including the "Chevy Runs Deep" campaign; McCann handled Chevrolet ads in China, Latin America, Mexico, Canada and other markets. Commonwealth handled and supervised creative work worldwide out of Detroit for all markets except China, India and Uzbekistan, where GM has joint auto-making ventures. McCann continued to handle ads in China and India, and Uzbekistan will be contracted as needed. MacLaren McCann continued on as AOR for the entire GM brand in Canada, but the Chevrolet brand will act as a "spoke" to Detroit's creative hub, with content and messaging flowing through Commonwealth, but adapted for the Canadian market.

Performance Marketing Group Incorporated manages Chevrolet Racing's experiential marketing properties for its at-track activation platforms in conjunction with the NASCAR Sprint Cup Series, the IZOD IndyCar Series, and the American Le Mans Series with Team Corvette.

=== Chevrolet-only naming attempt ===
In 2010, a memo signed by Chevrolet sales and service vice president Alan Batey and General Motors marketing division vice president Jim Campbell was sent to Chevrolet employees at its Detroit headquarters, instructing employees to only use Chevrolet when addressing the brand, in order to present a consistent brand message. A postscript to the memo says a sort of cuss jar - a plastic "Chevy" can - has been placed in the hallway. "Every time someone uses 'Chevy' rather than Chevrolet", the note said, the employee is expected to put a quarter in the can. The proceeds were to be spent on "a team building activity". Paul Worthington, head of strategy for Wolff Olins, said that the branding effort ran counter to a trend in which corporate names had become more casual.

Ian Beavis of Nielsen Automotive Group said that marketers cannot control what consumers call their products, but nicknames do not work in new markets where Chevrolet is trying to get a start. Following the release of the memo, General Motors published a statement claiming the note was in no way discouraging customers or fans from using the Chevy name. Following the 2010 memo incident, Chevy Runs Deep campaign remains to use the 'Chevy' name, while Driving Our World Forward and Find New Roads campaigns uses the 'Chevrolet' name.

== Watches ==
In 2007, General Motors allowed AJS-Production SA to register the Louis Chevrolet trademark for a line of premium quality Swiss watches watch marketed under the Louis Chevrolet brand name. Although the watches bear the name of Louis Chevrolet, they are not marketed or produced in association with General Motors.

The watch brand pays tribute to Louis Chevrolet, co-founder of the Chevrolet automobile company, whose father was a watchmaker and in his childhood helped his father at the workbench. The collection was called Frontenac, the name inherited from the race car company founded by Louis Chevrolet. The Chevrolet watch collection comprises automatic, manually wound and quartz models, equipped with ETA and Ronda movements.

The Louis Chevrolet Frontenac watches, manufactured in Porrentruy, the Swiss Jura region, feature the styling cues suggested by the Chevrolet cars. The collection was developed while applying the same materials as used in the car industry. Pearled appliques on the Chevrolet watches' dials remind the metal forms of the old dashboards. The number "8", Chevrolet's racing number, is sported on the case back.

== Branding by other manufacturers ==
In December 2019, after AvtoVAZ acquired General Motors' stake in their former GM-AvtoVAZ joint venture and as part of the deal, AvtoVAZ kept using the Chevrolet branding for the Niva models. The Chevrolet branding by AvtoVAZ continued until August 2020, when it was replaced with Lada.

== See also ==
- Chevrolet big-block engine
- General Motors Canada
- Geo – A brand of small cars and SUVs sold through Chevrolet dealerships throughout North America from 1989 to 1997
- Mason Truck
- Super Sport (Chevrolet)
