= Chevrolet Optra =

The Chevrolet Optra is an automotive nameplate used by the Chevrolet marque for three different compact car models, in the following markets:

- Daewoo Lacetti (2004–2013), in markets such as Colombia, Canada, Mexico, Japan, South Africa, and Southeast Asia
- Baojun 630 (2011–2023), in Egypt and Algeria.
- Chevrolet Aveo (310C) (2024–present), in Egypt
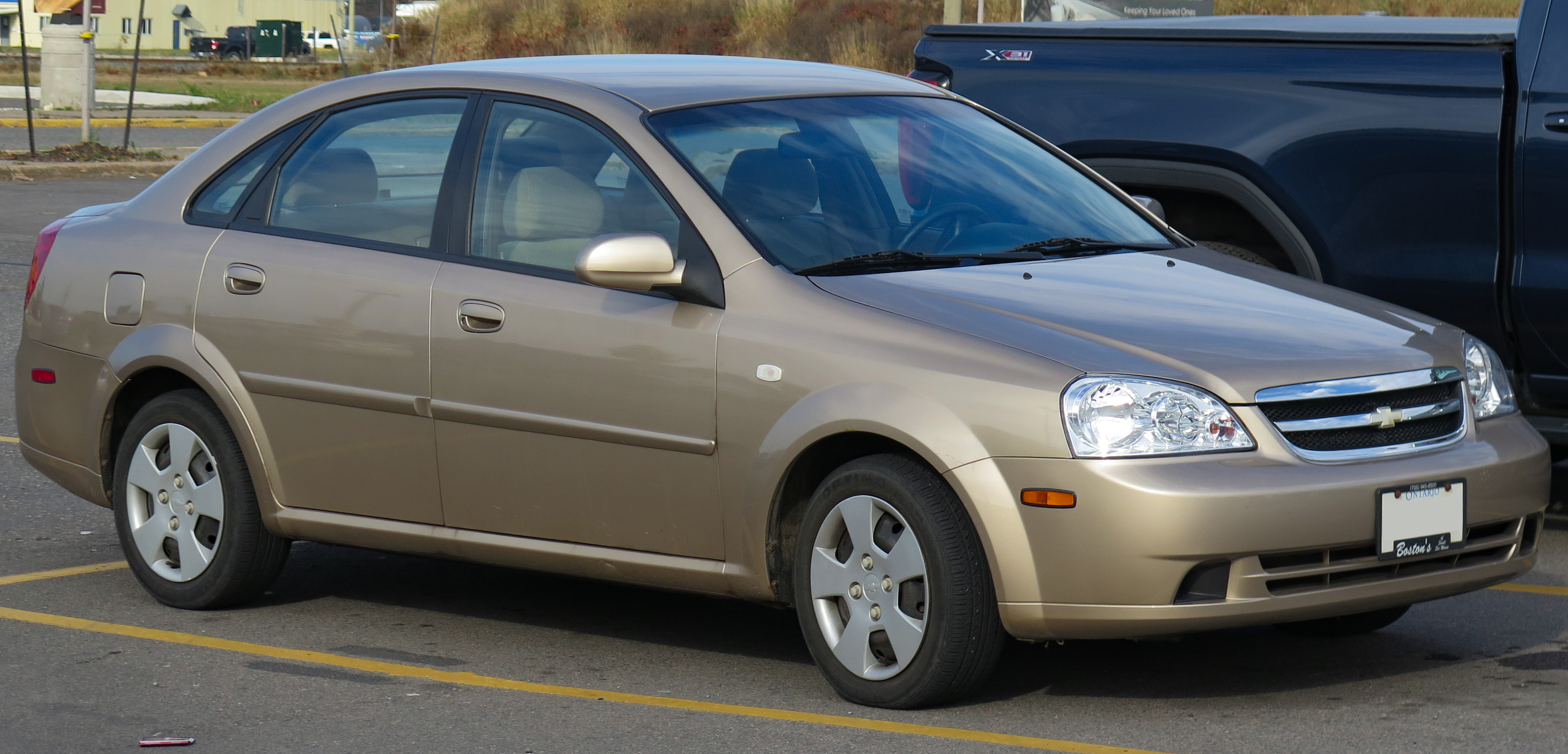

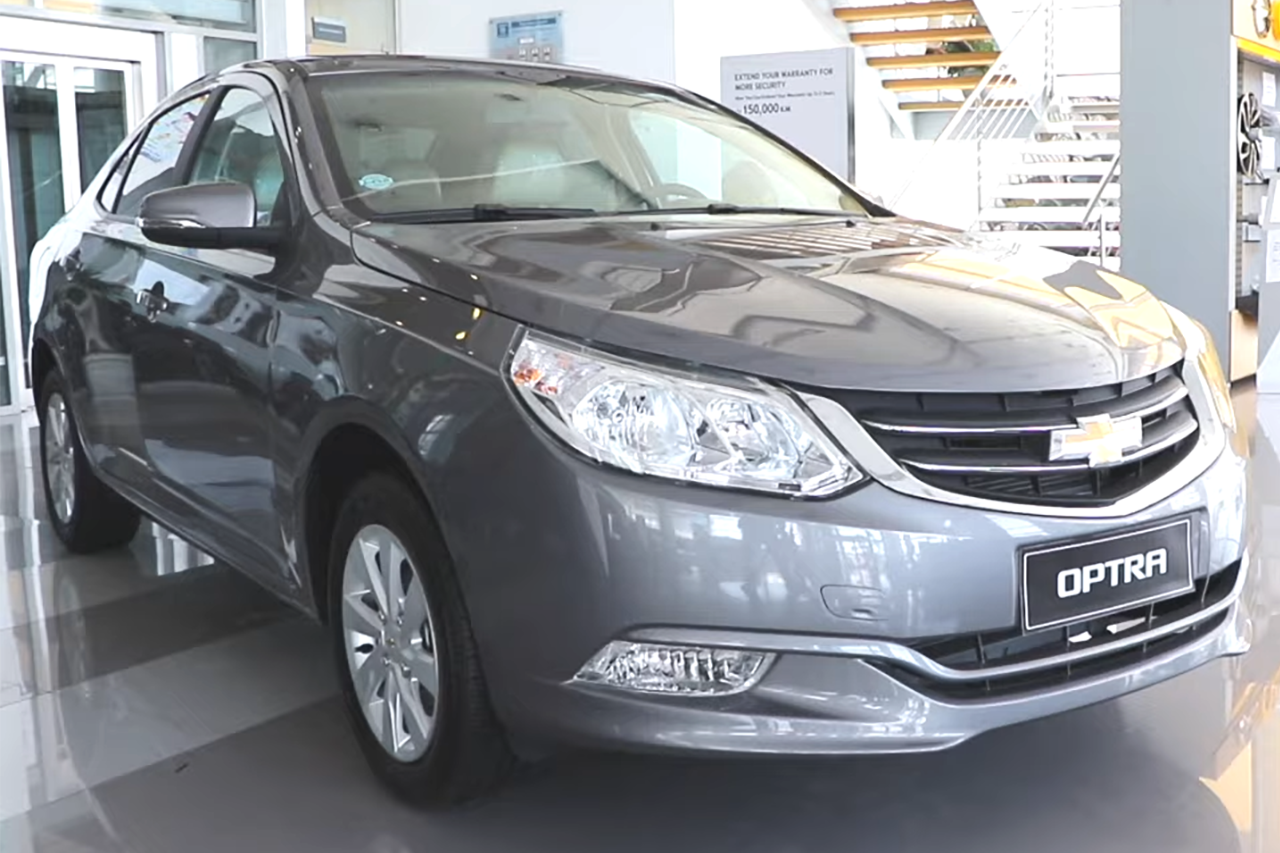

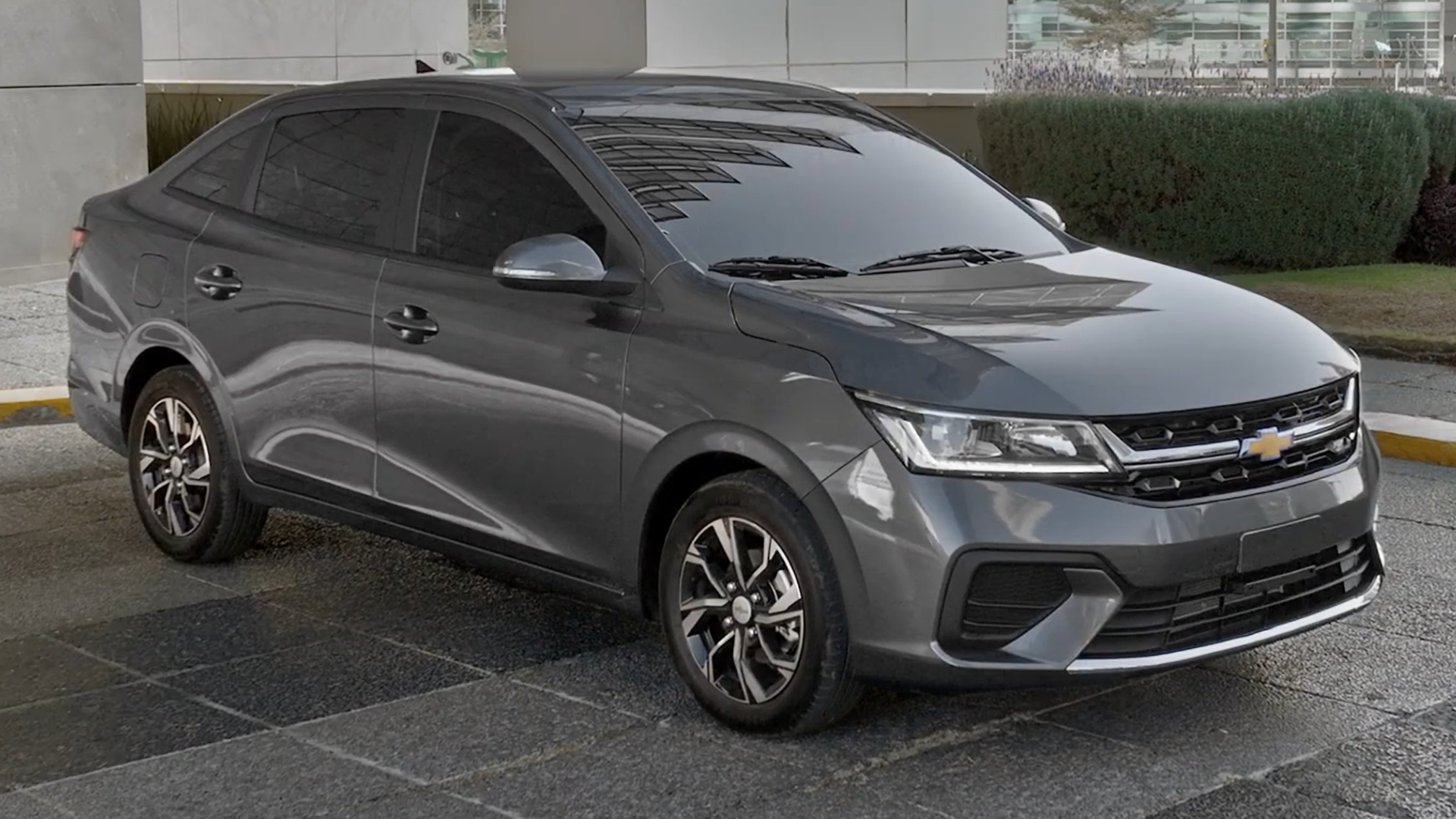
