= Klavika =

Geometric and humanist sans-serif typeface

- Category: Sans-serif
- Classification: Cross of Humanist and Geometric
- Designer: Eric Olson
- Foundry: Process Type Foundry
- Date created: 2004
- License: Proprietary
- Sample

Klavika is a family of sans-serif fonts designed by Eric Olson and released by Process Type Foundry in 2004. It contains four weights: light, regular, medium, and bold (with corresponding italics) and variations of numerals.

The family of typefaces is described as straight-sided technical sans-serifs flexible for editorial and identity design.

The capital G has no bar, the capital Q has a tail at the bottom, the lowercase g is double story, and the lowercase k has diagonal strokes that meet at the vertical, with a gap.

== Features ==
- Old-style and small cap numerals (with tabular)
- Small caps
- True italics
- Multiple language support
- Full set of arrows
- Available in OpenType, TrueType, PostScript, WOFF and EOT formats.

== In use ==
- The 2005 Facebook logo used a modified version of Klavika Bold.
- The American TV network NBC used Klavika for on-screen branding in 2006 but has since changed its primary typeface several times.
- Moses Mabhida Stadium in Durban, South Africa used Klavika in the signage during 2010 FIFA World Cup.
- Chevrolet uses a customized version of Klavika as a corporate typeface. One noticeable difference is the shape of the capital M which has straight rather than splayed sides. For Greek and Cyrillic alphabets, however, local Chevrolet dealers—in Greece and some of the countries using Cyrillic—uses some typefaces similar to Klavika. The condensed fonts were designed by Process Type Foundry LLC with Aaron Carámbula for General Motors marketer FutureBrand as part of re-design of Chevrolet in 2006. After the expiry of the exclusivity period, the commercial version of the font (Klavika Condensed) was released to the public in the fall of 2008. Chevrolet continued using Klavika until replacing it with custom fonts (Durant and Louis) around 2013.
- Atlassian has been using this since their re-branding in October 2011.
- Visual Identification of city of Katowice, Poland. (Klavika CH) Katowice Visual Identification Document
- The Glasgow Subway system now uses the font in all its recently re-branded visual identity.
- Portuguese college Instituto Superior Técnico uses this typeface since its 2012 re-branding.
- YG Entertainment uses Klavika since its brand identity renewal in 2013.
