= Chevrolet Europe =

Former subsidiary company of GM Korea

Chevrolet Europe GmbH
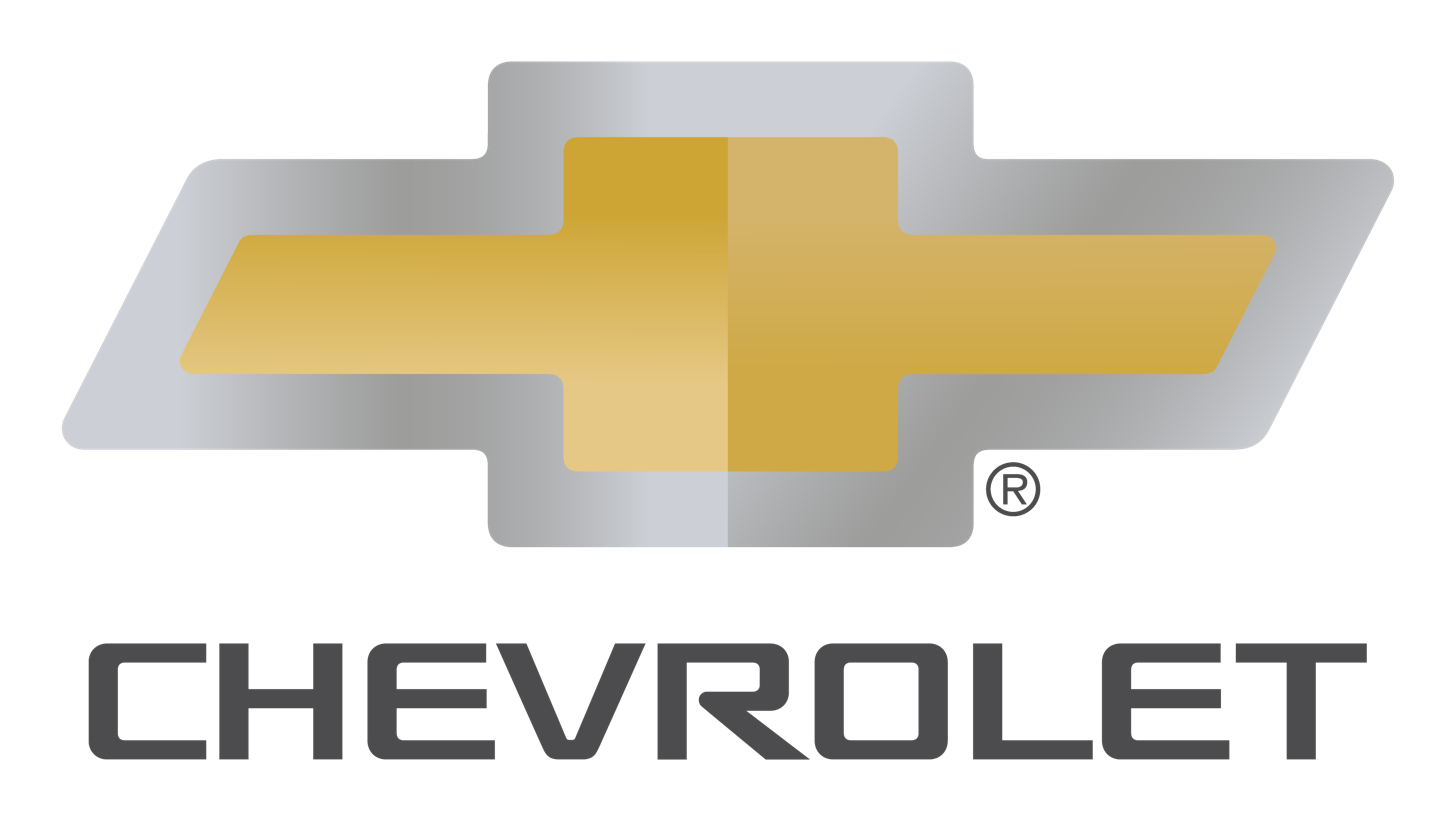
- Type: Subsidiary
- Industry: Automotive
- Founded: 2005
- Founder: General Motors
- Defunct: 2015; 11 years ago
- Fate: Withdrawn in 2013 (except Camaro and Corvette models); passenger cars merged into Opel/Vauxhall in 2016 and then sold to Groupe PSA
- Headquarters: Zürich, Switzerland
- Area served: Europe
- Key people: Dr. Thomas Sedran, Managing Director
- Products: Automobiles
- Owner: General Motors
- Number of employees: 800
- Parent: GM Korea
- Website: chevroleteurope.com

Chevrolet Europe GmbH was a subsidiary company of GM Korea (itself a subsidiary of U.S.-based automaker General Motors), founded in 2005, with headquarters in Zürich, Switzerland. It provided Chevrolet brand automobiles, most of which were made in South Korea for the European market.

In 2013 General Motors announced that it would withdraw the Chevrolet brand, with the exception of the Corvette and Camaro, from Europe except Russia and CIS member nations.

== History ==
Chevrolet has a history in the European market prior to the establishment of Chevrolet Europe in the 21st century. It had production facilities in Denmark, Poland, and Switzerland, which existed until 1968.

In the latter half of the 20th century, Chevrolet grew as a niche European brand with imports of the two flagship models, Corvette and Camaro, as well as other Chevrolet vehicles. At the 2004 Paris Motor Show, Chevrolet announced that it was relaunching the brand across Europe, basing its headquarters in Zürich, the largest city in founder Louis Chevrolet's native country of Switzerland. By 2010 sales had risen from 295,000 units in 2005 to 500,000. This level of growth was in part due to the introduction of small and mid-sized cars built by GMDAT (GM Daewoo Auto & Technology). Chevrolet announced plans to return two of their most iconic cars, the Camaro and Corvette, to Europe in 2011.

Korean-made Chevrolet models were officially withdrawn from Europe on December 31, 2017.

== Future cars and development ==
=== Chevrolet T2X Concept ===
Unveiled at the 2006 Seoul Motor Show, the T2X was developed in Korea by Chevrolet Europe's parent company, GM Daewoo. David Lyon, executive director of Design for GM Daewoo described it as a car that "exemplifies our company slogan ‘Driving Innovation’". Mixing together both elements of a Sports Utility Vehicle and a Sports Coupe, it has a wheelbase of 2,707 mm (8.881 ft), sporty wheel arches and wheels that are positioned outside of the vehicle's body giving the impression of an agile and athletic car. According to Max Wolff, deputy director of Advanced Design, the T2x has been designed to appeal to everyone, but in particular those in their 20s and 30s looking for a sports-car feel coupled with the practicality of an SUV.

=== Chevrolet Sequel ===
The Chevrolet Sequel is GM's first hydrogen powered vehicle. Unveiled at the North American International Auto Show in 2005, the vehicle operates via an electrochemical fuel-cell that combines hydrogen fuel with oxygen, generating electricity, the only by-product of this process being water vapour. Although former GM vice chairman Bob Lutz suggested that the Sequel could go into production by 2011, it was found the cost of producing the fuel-cells would be too expensive. Efforts were instead placed into preparing the hybrid technology behind the Volt for roll out over 2010/11.

== Models ==
=== Aveo ===
A 5-seater hatchback, the Aveo is being launched throughout Europe in Summer 2011 as a competitor to the likes of the Ford Fiesta, Opel Corsa and Volkswagen Polo. The second generation Aveo was launched at the 2010 Paris Motor Show and is set to take over from the Daewoo Kalos, which has been known as the Chevrolet Aveo in most European markets for a number of years now. Earlier in the year, Chevrolet had also unveiled an Aveo RS concept, featuring 19-inch wheels (48 cm) and the North American Cruze's 138 bhp 1.4L Turbocharged Ecotec.

=== Captiva ===
Developed from the 2004, Chevrolet S3X concept car debuted at the 2004 Paris Motor Show, the Captiva is a crossover SUV developed in South Korea by GM Daewoo. In South Korea the car is referred to as the Daewoo Winstorm. Available in 5- and 7-seater iterations, What Car refers to the roominess and practicality of the cabin as a particularly strong aspect of the car. The equipment is also rated highly with base models being equipped with air conditioning, MP3 ready CD stereo, alloy wheels and a separately opening tailgate window.

=== Cruze ===
The Cruze name was initially used for a joint venture between Suzuki and GM which produced both the Cruze and the Suzuki Ignis in 2001. In its first incarnation, it was packaged as a crossover SUV. Subaru also adopted the shape of the car in 2003 to create the G3X Justy, exclusively distributed around Europe. In 2008, the name was resurrected as a compact sedan based on the GM Delta II platform, on which the European Opel/Vauxhall Astra also sits. The Cruze replaces the Chevrolet Cobalt and Daewoo/Chevrolet Lacetti. The Cruze body was used as part of a test to determine electric car driving patterns and "real world" behaviour, in preparation for the launch of the Chevrolet Volt. The cars are set to be outfit with 31 kWh battery packs that are claimed to have a range of 100 miles (160 km), producing a 0-62 mph (100 km/h) time of 8.2 seconds and a top speed of 103 mph (166 km/h). The battery unit itself is set to take just 8–10 hours to fully charge. In Europe a hatchback version of the Cruze was due to launch in the second half of 2011, with 1.6L and 1.8L petrol engines, accompanied by a 161 bhp 2.0 diesel. As yet there is no official word on whether the 1.4 ecotec engine used in North America will make its way into the European model.

=== Orlando ===
The Chevrolet Orlando is a seven-seater MPV released throughout Europe in Spring 2011. Seen as a rival to the Ford S-Max, VW Touran and Opel Zafira, it signals another step in Chevrolet's goal of establishing itself as a European brand. The car itself will initially be available in a 1.8-litre version delivering 139 bhp and two 2.0-litre diesel versions with the most powerful of the two creating 161 bhp (161 hp). In a first test of the car, UK car website, Autocar suggested that the car could compete with the Zafira and S-Max in terms of practicality. They pointed in particular to the size of the cabin and the 30 different seat arrangements, which helped position it as a significant rival in the MPV market.

=== Spark ===
Initially unveiled as a concept under the name "Beat" during the New York International Auto show in 2007, the Spark is aimed at targeting a younger urban market with a need for value, fuel economy and practicality. Along with two other concepts referred to as Trax and Groove, Chevrolet invited the public to vote on their site for which one they preferred. Upon winning and going into general production, Beat was first unveiled in Europe at the 2009 Geneva Motor Show under the name badge, Spark. Some of the revisions from the original Beat concept, to the final production line Spark, include a more-rounded nose and larger headlights. Upon going on sale, the Spark took over from the Matiz, which had been badged as a Chevrolet in recent years, and available in 1.0- and 1.2-litre variants. The underpinnings made it a sister car to the Opel/Suzuki joint venture which produced the Suzuki Splash and latest generation Opel Agila. These cars supplemented the petrol engines available in the Spark with a GM 1.3 diesel engine.

== Iconic models ==
=== Camaro ===
Along with the Corvette, the Camaro has been a popular American import to Europe since it launched in 1966. Chevrolet made the announcement in March 2010, that the Camaro was going to be made available on the European market for the first time in 2011. In a press release, Chevrolet stated that a coupe and convertible version would be made available, outfitted with 400 hp, 6.2-liter V8 Active Fuel Management engines.

Facing up against competition from the Citroën C3 Picasso and the Kia Soul, the Camaro was named the World Car Design of the Year at the 2010 World Car of the Year Awards.

European Union's new Euro 6d-Temp automotive emission regulations have ended the European sale of Camaro and Corvette (C7) on 31 August 2019. The 6.2-litre V8 engine fitted to both Camaro and Corvette (C7) could not be modified further to meet the new emission regulations.

=== Corvette ===
Chevrolet announced the arrival of the Corvette Grand Sport in March 2010. At the Geneva Motor Show 2010, Chevrolet showcased the Corvette Grand Sport, Coupe, and Convertible, announcing plans to release the Coupe and Convertible versions later in 2010.

=== Volt ===
The Volt is a hybrid electric vehicle set for release in the fourth quarter of 2011 in Europe. After the Volt concept was unveiled during the 2007 Detroit Auto Show, GM former vice-chairman, Bob Lutz suggested that the Volt was the "first steps in the electrification of the automobile". The Volt itself runs on a lithium-ion battery that Chevrolet claim can last for up to 60 miles on a single charge. After the charge has depleted, a petrol powered generator starts to charge the battery enabling a further 400 miles of range.

It has been on sale in the US since December 2010 in a select number of regions where it has been met with largely positive reviews. Washington Post journalist, Gene Weingarten, renowned for his stance against American cars tested the Volt and suggested that the versatility of the engine showed insight that differentiated it from any other car before it.

The Volt has also received several awards including ‘Car of the Year’ accolades from auto magazines Motor Trend and Automobile.
