= Captiva =

Captiva may refer to:

- Captiva 240, an American sailboat design
- Captiva, Florida, an unincorporated community on Captiva Island, Florida, United States
- Captiva Island, an island in Florida, United States
- Captiva Records, an American record label
- Captiva Software, an American software company
- Chevrolet Captiva, a compact crossover SUV marketed by General Motors
- Holden Captiva, the Australian version of the first-generation Chevrolet Captiva
- Captiva (album), an album by Christian rock band Falling Up
- Captiva, an instant camera released by Polaroid during the mid-1990s
