= Chevrolet Prototypes (Turismo Carretera) =

The Chevrolet prototypes were a series of vehicles that competed in Argentine motorsports presented by different preparers, who powered their machines with Chevrolet engines. The first of them was the revolutionary Chevitú, the creation of José Froilán González and which marked a turning point in Argentine motorsports. The most successful of them was the Trueno Naranja, created by Horacio Steven and champion in 1968, with Carlos Alberto Pairetti at the wheel.

== History ==
Throughout the history of Turismo Carretera, a long succession of models paraded through the routes and racetracks of Argentina. From the old little cups, through the most varied and attractive prototypes of the Sports category, to the compact ones that today have the Torino, the Chevy, the Falcon, and the Polara, as flagship cars. This is how the great history of Argentine motorsports was formed.

And going to the prototypes, we will see a bit of the history of the Chevrolet Prototypes, among which are the Chevitú, the Trueno Naranja, the Garrafa, the Chevytres and other models that have not been important in terms of a number of races won, but who also knew how to give a show.

Chevitú
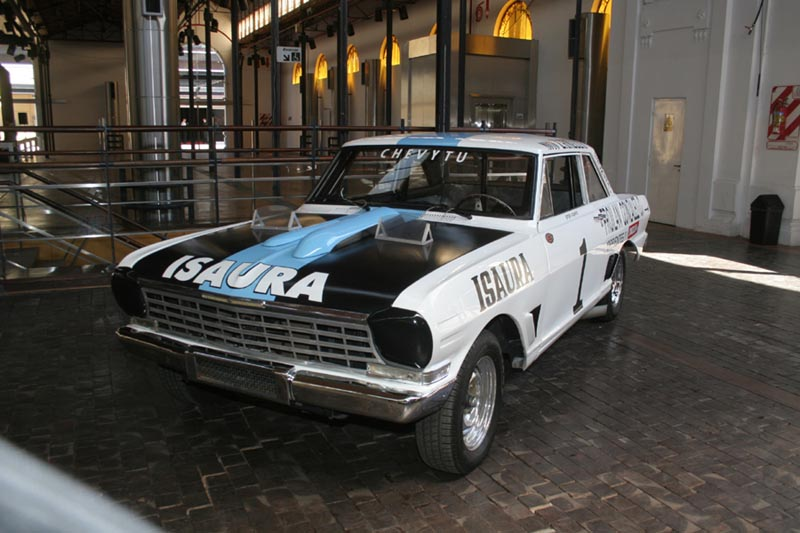
- Category: ACTC stock car
- Constructor: General Motors
- Designer: José Froilán González
- Production: 1964-1967

Technical specifications
- Chassis: Steel tube frame
- Suspension (front): Double wishbones, pushrod actuated coil springs over shock absorbers, anti-roll bar (Deformable parallelogram)
- Suspension (rear): Double wishbones, pushrod actuated coil springs love shock absorbers, anti-roll bar (formerly rigid axle)
- Length: 4,650 mm (183.1 in)
- Width: 1,750 mm (68.9 in)
- Height: 1,400 mm (55.1 in)
- Wheelbase: 2,790 mm (109.8 in)
- Engine: Chevrolet 250 cu in (4 L) OHV I6 naturally-aspirated FR
- Transmission: 4-speed manual + reverse
- Power: 230–255 hp (172–190 kW)
- Weight: 1,270 kg (2,800 lb)

Competition history

The Chevitú was a vehicle prepared from an American Chevrolet Nova sedan two-door model, similar to the Argentine Chevrolet 400. It was designed by the famous former Formula One driver José Froilán González, who to achieve his mission imported a two-door Chevrolet Nova from the United States to which he put a Chevrolet 400 engine. The preparation of this machine was entrusted to the brothers, Aldo and Reynaldo Bellavigna, while the engines were in charge of Bernardo Pérez and the driving by Jorge Cupeiro.

The appearance of the Chevitú meant a great revolution in national motoring, since it gave rise to the modern era of compact cars. Its appearance in 1964 generated approval and controversy, to the point of having been bottled by the public who refused to accept the evolution of Road Tourism. At that time, Froilán González's intention to return Chevrolet to the forefront almost materialized when Jorge Cupeiro came runner-up in 1965 with Chevitú, facing La Galera led by Dante Emiliozzi.

The Chevitú was the first compact car to obtain a victory in Turismo Carretera, giving rise to the modern era and initiating the glorious retirement of the "cupecitas" from Argentine motorsports. Its name comes from the Spanish deformation of the English term Chevy Two, the original name of the base model of the prototype, a Chevy II Nova coupe.

The vehicle debuted in 1964, and is presented as the first compact car in the history of TC. However, he had to wait almost a year to win his first victory, on March 13, 1965, at the Buenos Aires Autodromo, with Cupeiro at the wheel. This victory would also mean the first triumph of a compact car in Turismo Carretera. Over the course of the season, the Chevitú would reach the top step of the podium 6 more times, but it would not be enough to defeat the powerful vehicle of Dante Emiliozzi, staying with the runner-up in '65.

In 1966, with the aim of being able to increase the performance of the Chevitú, Froilán González analyzed the idea of readapting the vehicle to the new Road Tourism regulations. Thus, he entrusted Alain Baudena's Baufer Styler company with a series of reforms that would end up being reflected in the Chevitú MkII. To get to this model, Baufer had to reform the body, replacing the original Chevrolet Nova trunk with a tapered section plastic trunk, also cutting about 25 centimeters from the trunk. To all this, they would add some side intakes on the engine at the height of the doors, fulfilling the function of cooling the impeller. This model would not manage to have the same repercussion as its predecessor, achieving only three victories, these being alternated between Cupeiro and Carlos Marincovich, who drove the prototype on some occasions.

The performance demonstrated in 1966 little or nothing convinced Froilán, who, determined to experiment with new development alternatives for his unit, summoned a then-new designer Heriberto Pronello, who was entrusted with the task of implementing new reforms to the prototype. The result of this work was the Chevitú MkIII, for which the most severe reforms were carried out since its first surgery, this time modifying the rear roof drop, incorporating a fastback-style design, with a huge rear window, similar to the Barracuda prototype designed by Vicente Formisano. The vehicle was presented in 1967, but without obtaining any success mainly due to his continuous withdrawals due to engine problems.

After this attempt, in this same season, a new reformulation for Chevitú was sought. Without the services of Pronello (who dedicated 100% to the construction and attention to the Liebre-Torino prototypes of the official IKA team, along with Oreste Berta), Froilán turns to the coachbuilder Raúl Cábanas, who radically reformulates the design of the Chevitú, applying a drop of the Steeper rear overhang, eliminating the rear window. In this way, the Chevitú MkIV was presented, which managed to get closer again to the close-ups of the TC, but without the brilliance of its first predecessor, losing ground heavily against new adversaries such as the Garrafa Chevrolet or the Liebre-Torino. Finally, by mid- 1968, Froilán decided to entrust Francisco "Paco" Martos with the construction of a new prototype, which ended up bearing the nickname " Chevytres ". 2 The fate of the original Chevitú was unknown, a replica of the original prototype being built, which is exhibited at the Juan Manuel Fangio Automobile Museum, in the city of Balcarce.

== The Carafe ==
Carafe - Chevrolet
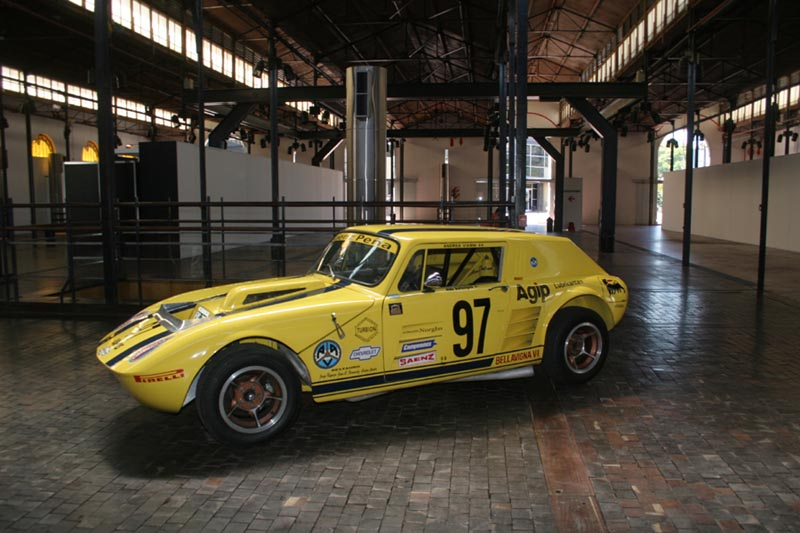
- Category: ACTC stock car
- Designer: José Froilán González
- Production: 1964-1967

Technical specifications
- Chassis: Steel tube frame
- Suspension (front): Double wishbones, pushrod actuated coil springs over shock absorbers, anti-roll bar (Deformable parallelogram)
- Suspension (rear): Double wishbones, pushrod actuated coil springs love shock absorbers, anti-roll bar (formerly rigid axle)
- Length: 4,440 mm (174.8 in)
- Width: 1,600 mm (63.0 in)
- Height: 1,510 mm (59.4 in)
- Wheelbase: 2,626 mm (103.4 in)
- Engine: Chevrolet 250 cu in (4 L) OHV I6 naturally-aspirated FR
- Transmission: 4-speed manual + reverse
- Power: 230–255 hp (172–190 kW)

Competition history

La Garrafa was one of the first prototypes to be presented in Turismo Carretera. Its creation was in charge of the brothers Aldo and Reynaldo Bellavigna, who entrusted the design of the car to the designer Jorge Parodi and based the construction of the car on the chassis of a Kaiser Bergantín (platform derived from the Alfa Romeo 1900 ), considering that this Car had an excellent wheelbase as well as good track clearance. They also wanted to provide the vehicle with more rational suspensions, little frontal area, little weight, and the possibility of profitable mass power. It came equipped with a Chevrolet engine ."230" of 3100 cm³. The preparation of the car was in charge of the Bellavigna Brothers themselves, and the driving of this car was entrusted to the Italian-Argentine driver Andrea Vianini, who was already known in the environment for being a benchmark for the Alfa Romeo brand in Argentina and was known to the Bellavignas for having driven a Maserati with a Chevrolet engine, owned by Froilán González and also prepared by said brothers.

He made his motorsport debut on June 16, 1967, winning the race held at the Buenos Aires Autodromo. There, he faced the power of the official IKAteam, which put the Torinos prepared by Oreste Berta on the track. Another of his staunch rivals that date was the Baufer-Ford, prepared by Horacio Steven for the official Ford team and driven by Atilio Viale del Carril. The race was one of the most eventful in the category, since, after the first lap, the drivers encountered a car that was stopped on the starting grid. Several cars were involved, including that of Atilio Viale del Carril. However, Andrea Vianini was able to avoid the carambola and decidedly headed for victory, breaking the power of the Torinos, which marked the end of the era of the old "cupecitas".

It owes its amusing name to the advertisements that decorated it, among which the AgipGas advertisement, a gas company of Italian origin, stood out, as well as being painted in the colors of the Agip cylinders, which combined with its deep-drawn shape, he gave the impression of being a real walking jug.

At the end of 2018, Aldo Bellavigna donated this car and a TC2000 Dodge 1500 to the Fangio de Balcarce Museum.

== The Barracuda ==
Barracuda-Chevrolet
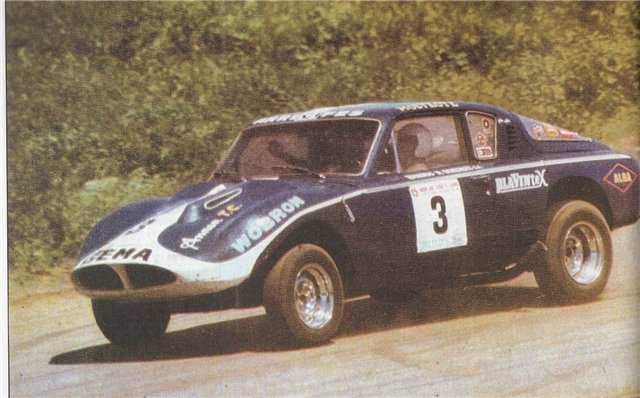
- Category: ACTC stock car
- Designer: Vincent Formisano
- Production: 1967-1969

Technical specifications
- Chassis: Steel tube frame
- Suspension (front): Double wishbones, pushrod actuated coil springs over shock absorbers, anti-roll bar (Deformable parallelogram)
- Suspension (rear): Double wishbones, pushrod actuated coil springs love shock absorbers, anti-roll bar (formerly rigid axle)
- Length: 3,800 mm (149.6 in)
- Width: 1,900 mm (74.8 in)
- Height: 1,400 mm (55.1 in)
- Wheelbase: 2,820 mm (111.0 in)
- Engine: Chevrolet 250 cu in (4 L) OHV I6 naturally-aspirated FR
- Transmission: 4-speed manual + reverse
- Power: 230–255 hp (172–190 kW)

Competition history

The Barracuda, or Barracuda Chevrolet was a racing prototype that was also presented during the first generation of this class of vehicles, within Turismo Carretera. The appearance of cars such as "La Garrafa" by Vianini or "El Petiso" by Rodolfo De Álzaga, marked the beginning of a new era in the TC. This was how the new generation of vehicles began to relegate the old coupes of the '30s, within the TC fleet. Faced with this reality, coachbuilder Vicente Formisano began to outline the shape of a new car, basing his lines on the Plymouth Barracuda model launched in 1964 in the United States. To achieve its mission and respect the origins of the American model, it decided to take the platform of the Valiant IV model as the basis for its creation, which in turn was derived from the 1966 Dodge Dart model.

To outline this car, Formisano first had to cut out the entire section belonging to the roof and the rear overhang, leaving only the nose, the torpedo, and the front half of the passenger compartment. After this "surgery", the assembly of the safety grid would begin, twinning the entire structure with the body. Once this implant was finished, the reform of the roof began, to which it was molded in order to achieve in the rear, the truncated Fastback-style design that characterized the Plymouth sports model at that time.. At the end of this redesign, Formisano finished off the body with the implementation of an acrylic rear window that gave the unit its final shape. Other reforms implemented in the vehicle were the replacement of the original nose of the Valiant IV with a pointed section insert, similar to the implements adapted by Heriberto Pronello for his Liebre-Torino, the displacement of the torpedo to 15 cm from its original place and the recess in the ceiling by 3 cm, in order to achieve the desired effect.

Originally, these units were intended for the squad of the official team of the Chrysler Dealer Racing Commission (CCCC), however, whoever first became interested in the project when they saw that they no longer had the weapons to face the new vehicles, it was the driver Carlos Pairetti, who, contrary to what was planned, decided to motorize this unit with a 230-cubic-inch Chevrolet impeller. It was so that, after having started 1967 SeasonCommanding his old coupe, he would continue competing for the rest of the season with this new unit, which he named Barracuda-Chevrolet, combining the name of the prototype with its engine. The Barracuda made its debut on July 30, 1967, in the Vuelta de Salto, recording an abandonment as an initial result. However, despite that unfortunate start, Pairetti would manage to rebuild himself on the following date and would achieve victory in the Hughes Tour, one of the tests where this pilot from Reef repeated his victory the most times.

With the Barracuda, Pairetti competed until 1968, obtaining two more victories in the Vuelta de Olavarría in '67 and in Balcarce in '68. However, due to the advance led by Torino and his Liebres prototypes, the Barracuda and its 230 engine were beginning to become obsolete. It was so that in mid- 1968, Pairetti would decide to renew himself by presenting the Baufer-Chevrolet model, popularly known as the Orange Thunder, on the track, while the Barracuda would be entrusted to his friend, Néstor Jesús García Veiga. In the hands of García Veiga, the model would compete for a couple more races, finally being relegated in 1969 ., when he had his last participation on March 23, 1969, during the Vuelta de Santa Fe. The pilots Fernando Arana and Hugo Alberini also participated in the TC under the command of a unit similar to this one, who alternated in driving this machine.

== Fast ==
Fast Chevrolet
- Category: ACTC stock car
- Constructor: General Motors
- Designers: Baufer; Horacio Steven
- Production: 1968-1970

Technical specifications
- Chassis: Steel tube frame
- Suspension (front): Double wishbones, pushrod actuated coil springs over shock absorbers, anti-roll bar (Deformable parallelogram)
- Suspension (rear): Double wishbones, pushrod actuated coil springs love shock absorbers, anti-roll bar (formerly rigid axle)
- Length: 4,750 mm (187.0 in)
- Width: 1,840 mm (72.4 in)
- Height: 1,270 mm (50.0 in)
- Wheelbase: 2,600 mm (102.4 in)
- Engine: Chevrolet 194 cu in (3 L) OHV I6 naturally-aspirated FR
- Transmission: 4-speed manual + reverse
- Power: 300 hp (224 kW)
- Weight: 1,270 kg (2,800 lb)

Competition history

The Fast Chevrolet or Orange Thunder was the most successful Chevrolet Prototype of all. This model is neither more nor less than the evolution of the Baufer-Ford created by Baufer and prepared by Horacio Steven, which had as an unfortunate balance, the deaths of Oscar Cabalén and his companion, and that of Atilio Viale del Carril's companion. These deaths were the reason why the official Ford team withdrew its support from Steven, giving it to José Miguel Herceg, one of the most successful tuners of the brand.

Upon becoming aware of the existence of this car, Carlos Alberto Pairetti approached Steven's workshop to propose that he redesign the model and equip it with Chevrolet engines. Finally, the car debuted at the Buenos Aires racetrack, where it finished with a DNF. However, in the following races, the car finished consolidating, winning 4 competitions in 1968 and winning the title that year, defeating its classic rivals: the Liebre MkII Torino by Oreste Berta. This car marked a milestone in the category as it became the first Sports Prototype to become champion of Turismo Carretera.

The color of this car was decided at the last minute. When the car was ready it was time to paint it. Not finding paint shops open (it was 2 in the morning), it was decided to search the workshop. Three colors were found: Red, Yellow, and White. One liter of each. Mixing those colors, the initial Orange of this car was obtained. But every time they finished a race, they couldn't repeat the color to cover up the buns and scratches. It was then that General Motors appeared, offering official support to the team, in addition to launching a series of cars painted in orange, paint with which they restored the car. From then on, the car was stored in the General Motors sheds in San Martín (Buenos Aires). The passion that it generated was such that the fans of the brand went to the sheds to see the exit of the vehicle.

It owes its name to the color with which it was painted, and to the nickname with which it was baptized by José Tomás Onetto, a journalist from Diario Clarín who was covering the alternatives of national motoring at that time and who was impressed with the speed of the car. and its power.

After his participation in Turismo Carretera, Pairetti would end up selling his car to the driver Eduardo Bouvier, who years later would become president of the Formula Renault Argentina category. Bouvier, acquired the vehicle in 1971, using it to compete in Sport Prototype races, even cutting the roof to obtain better performance. After his retirement as a professional pilot, he began his restoration work, which would finally see the light of day in 2011.

On December 3, 2009, an exact replica of the Orange Thunder was presented at the Buenos Aires Autodromo, which was piloted by Pairetti himself, accompanied by his eternal companion Héctor "Laucha" Ríos. The car was manufactured at the Balcarce Regional Faculty of the National Technological University and presented in February 2009, during the second date of the Road Tourism calendar. The presentation in Buenos Aires was part of the category's year-end celebrations. Unlike the original, the 2009 model Orange Thunder is powered by a 3000 cm³ Chevrolet engine, replacing the original 4.1 from 1968. The mechanical kit also includes a modern 5-speed Sáenz gearbox like the current TC regulatory gearboxes.

After the presentation of this replica, Bouvier made public some photographs in which he exhibited the Original Thunder in an advanced state of restoration. His work finally culminated successfully in 2011, when he was finally able to present the original Prototype during the TC Caravan, organized by the Road Tourism Corridors Association to commemorate the 75th anniversary of said category.

== Golden Thunder ==
Golden Thunder
- Category: ACTC stock car
- Constructor: General Motors
- Designers: Baufer; Horacio Steven
- Production: 1968

Technical specifications
- Chassis: Steel tube frame
- Suspension (front): Double wishbones, pushrod actuated coil springs over shock absorbers, anti-roll bar (Deformable parallelogram)
- Suspension (rear): Double wishbones, pushrod actuated coil springs love shock absorbers, anti-roll bar (formerly rigid axle)
- Length: 4,750 mm (187.0 in)
- Width: 1,840 mm (72.4 in)
- Height: 1,270 mm (50.0 in)
- Wheelbase: 2,600 mm (102.4 in)
- Engine: Chevrolet 194 cu in (3 L) OHV I6 naturally-aspirated FR
- Transmission: 4-speed manual + reverse
- Power: 300 hp (224 kW)
- Weight: 1,270 kg (2,800 lb)

Competition history

The Trueno Dorado was another Chevrolet prototype prepared by Horacio Steven for the official General Motors Turismo Carretera team. It was the second car of the Competición SA squad, which had received official support from General Motors of Argentina, after the performances made in the debut of the Trueno Naranja and in the following races.

The car was an exact copy of the Orange Thunder and was conceived from the same plans as his twin brother, only in this case it was painted in a golden yellow color to differentiate it from the mythical Carlos Pairetti car. The Golden Thunder was the team's test car since most of the elements that later equipped the Orange Thunder had been tested on it, the most important being the rear hub that after a race in Buenos Aires, on July 23, 1968, in which the Orange Thunder broke its own, was developed by the "Competición SA" team on the other saved prototype.

This prototype was released later, on August 18, 1968, driving Oscar "Cacho" Fangio, and being the support vehicle for Trueno Naranja in the fight for the title. Its most outstanding performance occurred on the penultimate date of the year 1968 when at the Rafaela circuit, the two cars of the "Competición" team finished second and third behind Carlos Marincovich 's Chevytres, which was prepared by the outstanding Formula 1 driver. Jose Froilan Gonzalez. Cacho Fangio, who drove the Golden Thunder, finished in third place, watching the back of his teammate Carlos Pairetti.

== Martos ==
Martos-Chevrolet
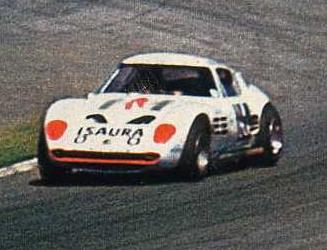
- Category: ACTC stock car
- Designers: Baufer; Martos; González-Pérez
- Production: 1968

Technical specifications
- Chassis: Steel tube frame
- Suspension (front): Double wishbones, pushrod actuated coil springs over shock absorbers, anti-roll bar (Deformable parallelogram)
- Suspension (rear): Double wishbones, pushrod actuated coil springs love shock absorbers, anti-roll bar (formerly rigid axle)
- Length: 4,750 mm (187.0 in)
- Width: 1,840 mm (72.4 in)
- Height: 1,270 mm (50.0 in)
- Wheelbase: 2,600 mm (102.4 in)
- Engine: Chevrolet 250 cu in (4 L) OHV I6 naturally-aspirated FR
- Transmission: 4-speed manual + reverse
- Power: 300 hp (224 kW)
- Weight: 1,270 kg (2,800 lb)

Competition history

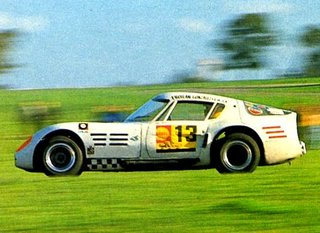
Side view of the Chevitres.

The Martos-Chevrolet prototype was a racing car created in 1968 by coachbuilder Francisco Martos at the request of former TC and Formula 1 driver José Froilán González, who commissioned him to build a new racing car due to the technological backwardness that experimented with its previous prototype, the Chevitú, against the new creations that dominated Highway Tourism at the end of the '60s.

This model would end up receiving the popular name of Chevitres, which implied with the suffix -tres that it was the succession of the Chevitú. His name was also known as Chevytres, replacing the I with a y, connoting the North American abbreviation for the Chevrolet brand.

This car was a completely revolutionary unit, as Martos would not rely on any production car to make it happen. The Martos-Chevrolet was mounted on an artisanal frame made of tubular pipes (created by Martos himself), receiving as its main characteristics the new "250" engine of 4100 cm³ and 7 benches, launched that year by Chevrolet to deal with the engines Tornado of the IKA Torino. The mechanical set was completed with a ZF gearbox and all this was coupled to a self-locking differential from Chevrolet Impala. The vehicle was completed with the body created by Baufer at the request of Martos, and two sets of suspensions, the original front ones being a Kaiser Brigantine and the rear of a Chevrolet 400. As a curiosity, the vehicle would adopt the use of the steering wheel in the right seat, a characteristic shared with several prototypes of the time.

The Chevitres debuted in Argentine motorsports on June 26, 1968, this also being the day of the presentation of one of its main opponents on the tracks: El Trueno Naranja. The driving of this car was entrusted to an old acquaintance of González, Carlos Marincovich, who knew how to drive the Chevitú during some competitions in 1966 and during the entire last stage in 1967, while again Bernardo Pérez would be trusted again for care. in the engines. His debut was in the race called the "250 Miles", with an abandonment. His first triumph would come on September 1, 1968winning the 3rd Juan Gálvez Grand Prix, at the Buenos Aires Autodrome. After this would come a second victory on November 3 of the same year at the Rafaela Autodrome, leading a 1-2-3 for Chevrolet, controlling the attacks of the team made up of Trueno Naranja and Trueno Dorado, who accompanied him on the podium. in 2nd and 3rd place respectively. After these two successes, Chevitres would not win again, closing his participation in 1969, running only on May 25 at the Buenos Aires Autodrome, and saying goodbye with an abandonment.

The figure of the Chevitres made an impact, since its design in the form of a truncated fastback reminded the Alfa Romeo TZ, in addition to having a great resemblance to the Trueno Naranja, from which it was barely distinguishable due to the lack of the Chevitres, the spoiler rear "duck tail" style that characterized the car immortalized by Carlos Pairetti. His only two achievements would come from the hand of Carlos Marincovich, who always remained loyal to Froilán González, throughout the latter's entire career as a coach.

== Nova Orange ==
Nova Orange
- Category: ACTC stock car
- Constructor: General Motors
- Designer: Heriberto Pronello
- Production: 1969-1970

Technical specifications
- Chassis: Steel tube frame
- Suspension (front): Double wishbones, pushrod actuated coil springs over shock absorbers, anti-roll bar (Deformable parallelogram)
- Suspension (rear): Double wishbones, pushrod actuated coil springs love shock absorbers, anti-roll bar (formerly rigid axle)
- Length: 4,750 mm (187.0 in)
- Width: 1,840 mm (72.4 in)
- Height: 1,270 mm (50.0 in)
- Wheelbase: 2,600 mm (102.4 in)
- Engine: Chevrolet 250 cu in (4 L) OHV I6 naturally-aspirated FR
- Transmission: 4-speed manual + reverse
- Power: 300 hp (224 kW)
- Weight: 1,270 kg (2,800 lb)

Competition history

After obtaining the championship title in 1968, Carlos Pairetti premiered the "1" aboard his Trueno Naranja prototype. However, the competition had come up in 1969 with new weapons to the fray.<ref.http://www.f1-web.com.ar/martoschevrolet.htm</ref>

The team led by the pilot Gastón Perkins, with the advice of Heriberto Pronello at the helm, presented a new evolution of its Liebre-Torino prototype on the track: La Liebre MKIII. This new machine was the ace that IKA had up its sleeve to recover the leadership that was taken from it in 1968.

Seeing that the Orange Thunder could do nothing against the new rivals, Pairetti decided to attack under the same law and with the same weapons as his opponent. It was so that after the third race of the year 1969, he handed over the driving of the Orange Thunder to his friend "Nene" Néstor Jesús García Veiga and decided to acquire one of the prototypes created by Heriberto Pronello, only in this case, instead of After motorizing his car with the IKA "Tornado" engines, he decided to use the same motorization as the Orange Thunder and put it under the orbit of the official Chevrolet team.

The car purchased by Pairetti was a Liebre MK III model with which IKA would participate in 1969, the creation of Heriberto Pronello. The result of this merger of two antagonistic currents of national motoring was a kind of MK III Chevrolet Hare, which, however, to avoid confusion, General Motors decided to rename it "La Nova Naranja".

La Nova Naranja received this name as an inheritance from its predecessor, Trueno Naranja, with which it shared the official team in 1969. This new model was designed by Pairetti to revalidate the "1" achieved in 1968. La Nova was named after the original name of the prototypes created by Pronello and Berta named Liebre. In addition, it was the name used in the United States by the Chevrolet 400 and the Chevrolet Chevy that debuted in the country months later.

Regarding its mechanics, the Nova Naranja equipped the same engines as the Trueno Naranja, a 4.1-liter (250 cu in.) "250" engine with three carburetors, coupled to a 4-speed manual gearbox similar to the gearbox of the Chevrolet Corvette. Its chassis was the same frame of IKA origin that equipped the IKA-Renault Torino since it was a car similar to the ones that were prepared for the said official team. Regarding its decoration, Pairetti himself requested that the car receive the same treatment as the Orange Thunder, with the difference that the roof of the Nova was white, in addition to carrying the same sponsors and the same official support. from General Motors.

The results of the Nova were very mixed, having few victories and without equaling the success obtained by its predecessor. The Orange Thunder was also unable to repeat its success from the previous year with its new driver behind the wheel. However, despite this, they always had the recognition and unconditional support of their fans.

Finally, and to the sadness of the fans of the brand, in 1970 with the advent of Formula B, Carlos Pairetti was hired by the official Ford Turismo Carretera team, and his car, La Nova Naranja, was powered by the Ford Falcon engine. from then. That decision was harshly criticized by Chevrolet fans who did not accept the fact of seeing one of their prototypes carrying the rival's motorization, much less seeing their banner of the last two years running with the rival brand. Neither did the Ford people accept Pairetti's incursion behind the wheel of a car made by him, since he came from Chevrolet, a brand he represented for 15 years. To avoid greater evils, Pairetti decided to rename the car with the name of Liebre-Ford, leaving the name of Nova Naranja forever and as the heritage of the Chevrolet brand.
