= Chevrolet Chevy Malibu =

Chevrolet Chevy
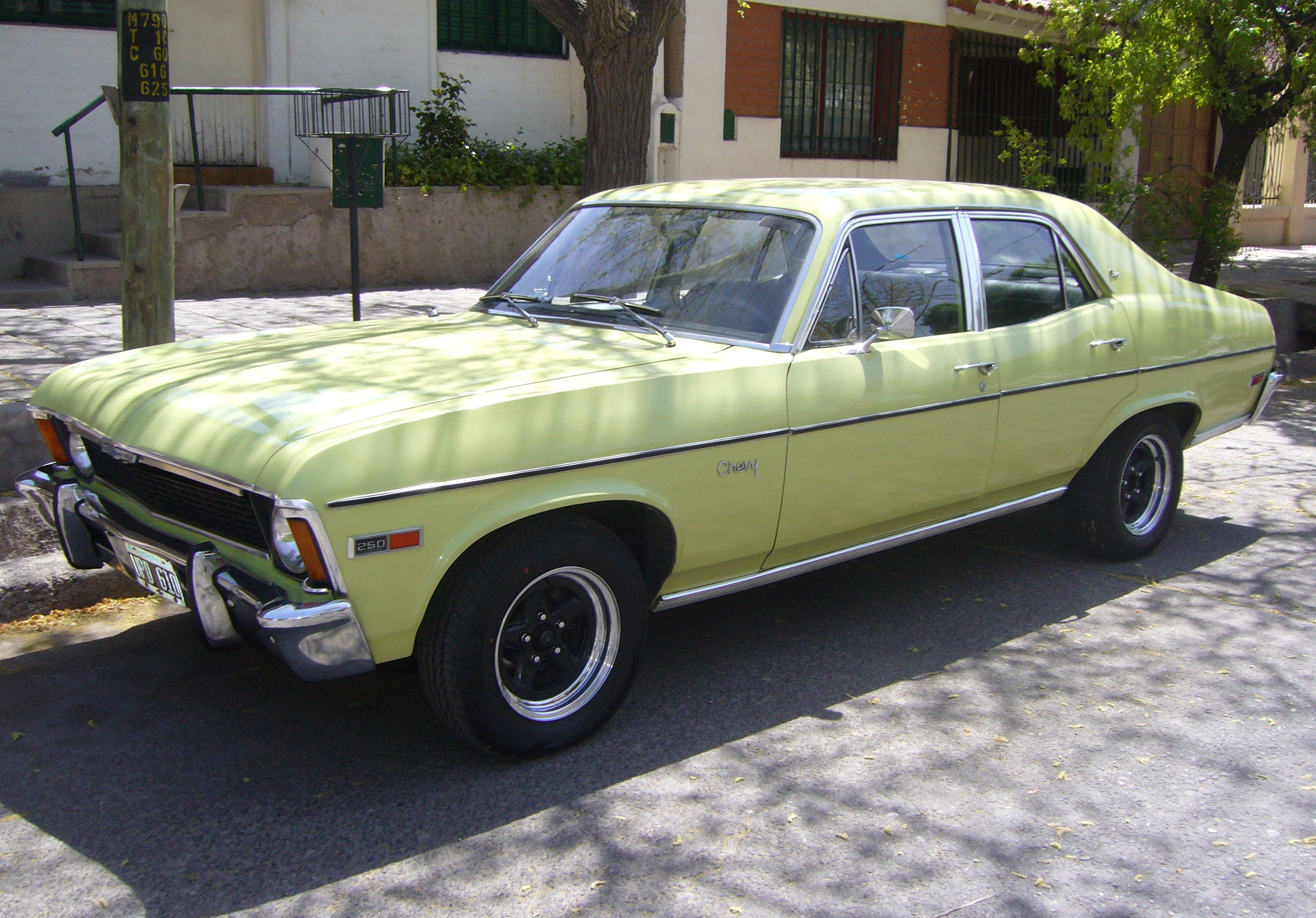

Overview
- Type: Passenger car
- Manufacturer: Chevrolet (General Motors)
- Production: 1968–1982
- Assembly: San Martín, Buenos Aires, Argentina

Body and chassis
- Class: Executive car
- Body style: 4-door sedan
- Layout: Front engine, rear-wheel drive
- Related: Chevrolet Nova

Chronology
- Predecessor: Chevrolet 400

The Chevrolet Chevy was a compact car made by Chevrolet in Argentina from 1968 to 1982. Successor to the Chevrolet 400, the Chevy offered a more modern body style with better safety features and updated mechanicals.

The car was based on the U.S. market 1968 Chevrolet Nova. Only the 4-door sedan version was manufactured in the country, although U.S. versions included a two-door coupe in addition to the sedan.

The Chevy became one of the most successful models produced by General Motors de Argentina, being discontinued in 1978 when the company ceased operations in the country.

== History ==
General Motors de Argentina started production of the "Chevy" on August 16, 1969, being advertised as the great temptation. Although the Chevrolet 400 sold well in the Argentine market, General Motors decided on offering an updated model with more modern styling and up-to-date mechanicals. The Chevy 400 was based on the 1962 Chevy II, and by 1968, was already out of date.

While the equivalent U.S. Market Chevy Nova featured changes in safety and emissions equipment during its relatively short 1968–1974 run (it had a total restyle for 1975), the Argentina version retained the 1968 car's features throughout its entire run, including a dash-mounted ignition switch and smaller side marker lights.
