= General Motors de Argentina =

Argentina's division of General Motors

General Motors de Argentina S.R.L.

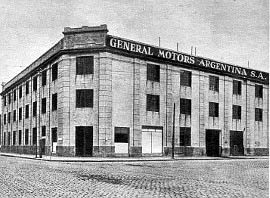
- The first GM Argentine factory located in San Telmo, c. 1925
- Company type: Subsidiary
- Industry: Automotive
- Founded: 1925
- Founder: Hampton and Watson (Note: Representatives of General Motors in Argentina)
- Headquarters: Vicente López, Buenos Aires (administrative seat); Alvear, Santa Fe (factory), Argentina
- Area served: Argentina
- Products: Automobiles; Pickups; Trucks
- Brands: Chevrolet List: Former brands: Buick; Cadillac; GMC; LaSalle; Marquette; Oakland; Oldsmobile; Opel; Pontiac; Bedford
- Parent: General Motors
- Website: chevrolet.com.ar

General Motors de Argentina S.R.L. is the Argentine subsidiary of the US-based company General Motors. The company is currently headquartered in Vicente López, Buenos Aires, with its factory located in Alvear, Santa Fe Province.

The seal of GM itself arrived in Argentina in 1922, through two importers that brought to the country the first models of Chevrolet. The company was founded in 1925, almost 17 years after the US plant was created, initially settling in San Telmo and then moving to the neighborhood of Barracas. Years later it would have its definitive installation in the historic site of the Buenos Aires town of San Martín. During this period the company manufactured models of the brands Chevrolet, Oldsmobile, Cadillac, Pontiac, LaSalle, Oakland, Marquette, Buick and Opel, the first having success.

With the installation of the San Martín factory production of the first 100% national Chevrolets began, among which the 400, Chevy (both versions derived from the Chevrolet Nova) and the C-10 pickup truck and the Opel K 180. Despite having led the market for quite some time, the sharp fall in sales of the company forced the closure of this in 1978.

Despite this closure, companies such as Sevel and Renault Argentina got licenses to manufacture Chevrolet pickup trucks in Argentina until 1994, when General Motors re-started operations in the country. From then on, GM has been producing Chevrolet sedans such as the Corsa, Agile, and Cruze.

== History ==
=== First years ===
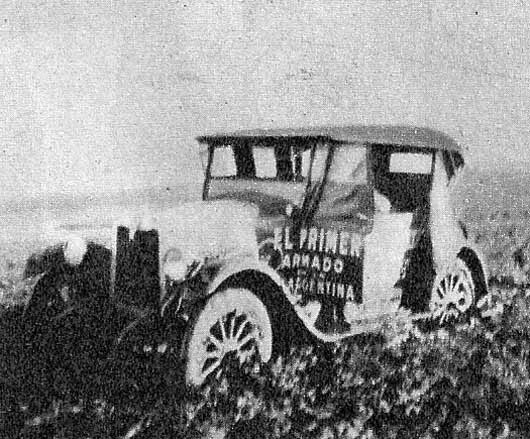
Chevrolet Doble Phaeton, the first model assembled by GM in Argentina, running on dirty roads

The history of GM in Argentina can be traced to 1922 when Hampton and Watson (that commercialised in Argentina cars bought and imported from General Motors signed an agreement with the parent company to begin assembling the first Chevrolet models in Argentina, importing the majority of their components from the US, then assembling the cars in the country, only adding the seat covers and some minor parts. The first model (a Doble Phaeton) was released in 1924, produced in the Chevrolet factory near Dársena Sur of port of Buenos Aires. In 1924, H&W ceased their representation of Chevrolet in Argentina, selling their contract to GM USA which took over the local subsidiary, therefore "General Motors de Argentina" was established. The company rented a warehouse on Ingeniero Huergo Avenue in San Telmo, supplying it with modern machinery so the new plant was established.

The first Chevrolet assembled in Argentina was the Doble Phaeton, consisted of local and imported materials to reduce cost and help local entrepreneurs develop their business. The car, named Campeón was released in 1925 at m$n2,085. GMA expanded its business to 400 representatives, selling more than 6,000 units in Argentina. That first Chevrolet model had five versions, including 2 and 4-door sedan, voiturette, and a light truck. Only two weeks after its release, GMA received 2,000 orders. By then, Argentina had a population of 10 million inhabitants and only 180,000 automobiles so the demand for those vehicles would increase in subsequent years. At the end of 1925, 7,930 cars and 521 trucks had been sold through 100 official dealers.

Apart from Chevrolet, GMA expanded its range of brands in Argentina, with the addition of Oldsmobile (assembled), Cadillac, and LaSalle (imported). In February 1926, the company reached 10,000 units produced.

=== Development ===
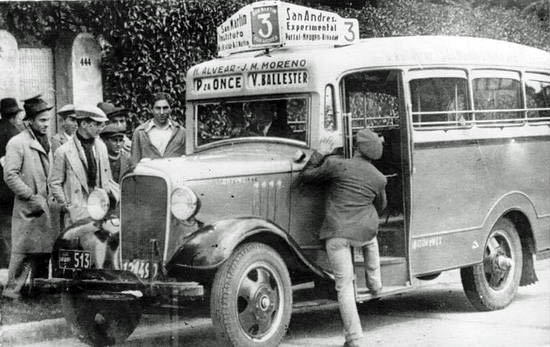
Chevrolet colectivo c. 1934 in the streets of Buenos Aires

GMA sales increased considerably. Pontiac and Oakland brands were added to the local production. The company sold 8,000 cars and 500 trucks a year, reaching 10,000 units in 1926. As the demand grew, the capacity of the factory was overloaded so the company was in search of a new location to move its production. Three years later, the new 48,000 m2 plant in the barrio of Barracas was inaugurated. During those times, the Buick, Cadillac, Marquette, LaSalle and Opel GM's brands were added to produce their vehicles in Argentina. Production reached 27,000 vehicles a year.

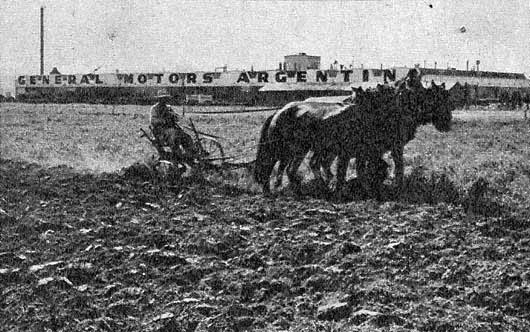
The San Martín factory under construction, c. 1939

By 1931, GMA manufactured in Argentina products from its complete list of brands. Three years later the company produced 120 vehicles a day, with Chevrolet also supplying "colectivos" (buses) for passenger public transport. In 1939, GMA acquired a 190,000 m^{2} (2,000,000 sq ft) site in General San Martín Partido of Greater Buenos Aires to establish another factory. Those lands were the property of the Central Argentine Railway. The factory opened in 1940, producing not only vehicles but refrigerators (under the "Frigidaire" brand), and automobile components such as batteries.

The birth of the racing car series Turismo Carretera (that would become very popular) encouraged GMA to compete with its models, with some legendary drivers like Juan Manuel Fangio being sponsored by Chevrolet. Fangio's run on TC was relatively short, but he won its first title in the category in 1940, the "Gran Premio Internacional del Norte", a 9,500-km length race between Buenos Aires and Lima. Fangio's victory on board a green Chevrolet coupe was also the first title won by the brand.

When the United States entered World War II, operations in Argentina became complicated. The interruption of imports to Argentina caused a lack of components to assemble vehicles. As a result, the Barracas factory ceased operations temporarily until the war finished. When production restarted, the first models released by GMA were Oldsmobile and Pontiac, with the addition of Bedford trucks from England. Chevrolet cars were later added to production.

=== First fully-Argentine vehicles ===
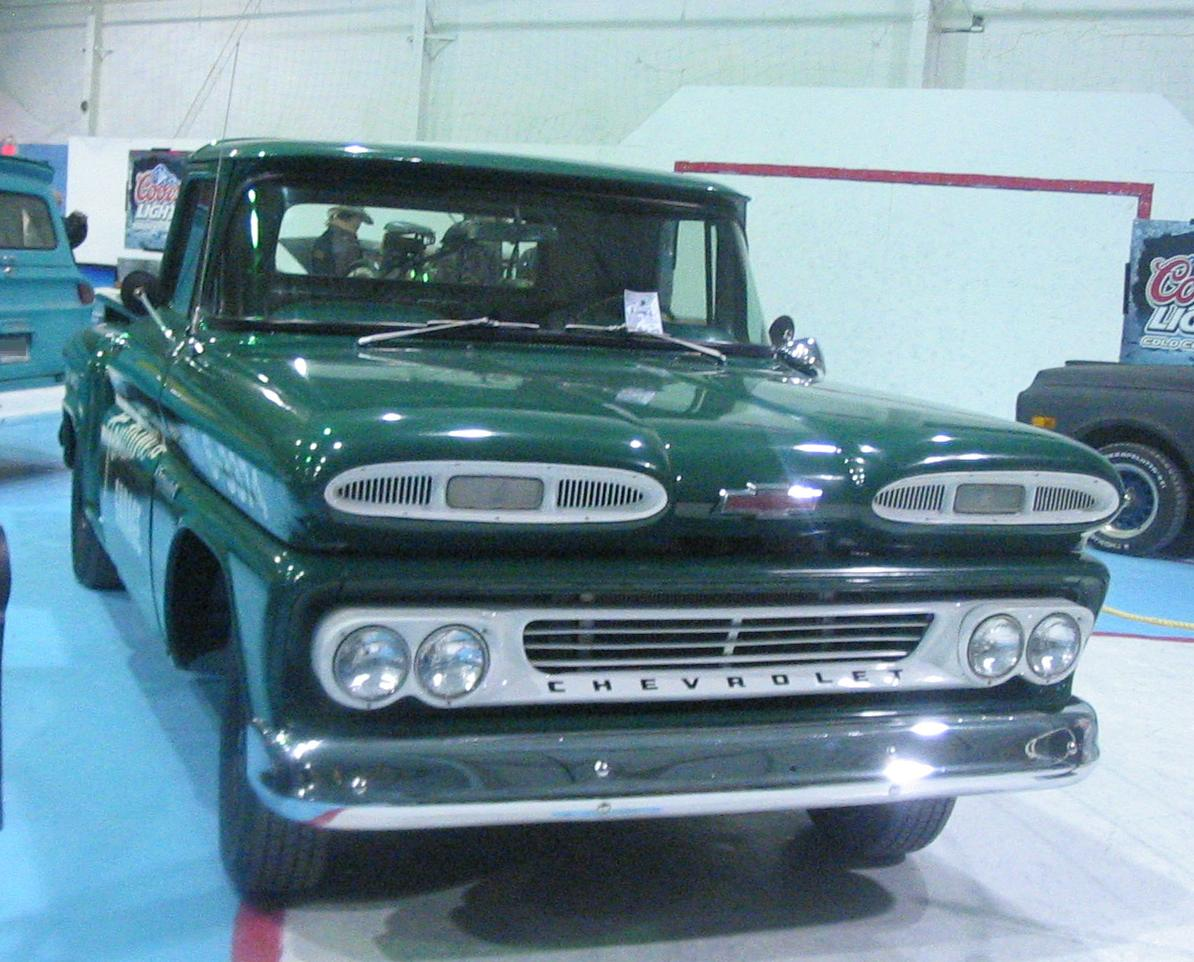
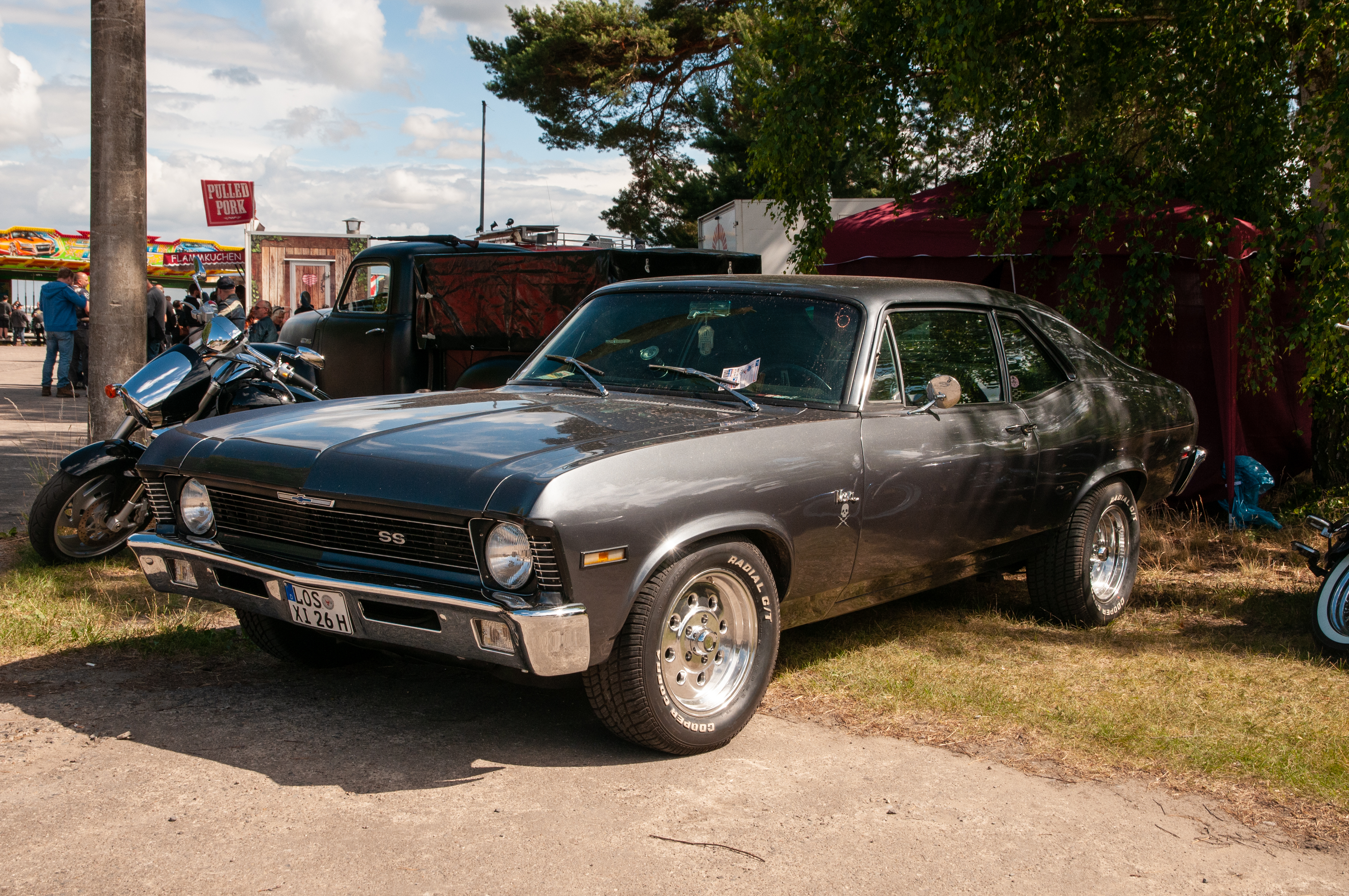
(Left): C/K pickup, the first fully-manufactured model by GM, launched in 1960; (right): Chevrolet Nova (rebranded "Chevy" in Argentina) became a success, with more than 65,000 units sold

In 1959 GMA refurbished the San Martín factory to produce fully-manufactured models, with the intention of develop local production and ceasing the import of components. One year later, the company released the C/K "Apache" pickup, becoming the first GM vehicle totally produced in the country.

Following that, the first GMA sedan came in 1962, when the subsidiary released the Chevrolet 400, a compact car based on the American Nova. This model lasted –with modest sales– until 1974. Apart from those models, GMA produced truck chassis and Bedford buses. In 1969, the "Chevy" (the third generation of US Nova) was launched in Argentina, originally as a 4-door sedan, then adding a 2-door version in 1971. GMA thought that car as a competitor of Ford Falcon and IKA-Renault Torino, similar-sized vehicles in the local market. The Chevy became the most acclaimed model of GMA until then, with 65,970 units produced (1969–78). while in 1970 the firm reached 75,000 vehicles produced.

=== Decline ===
By 1971, GMA exported 11,719 vehicles to several countries. Three years later, the company introduced a mid-size car, the Opel K 180 (derived from German Opel Kadett, but equipped with an engine fully-produced in Argentina). Nevertheless, the market share of the company began decreasing considerably from 9% to 2% within two years. In 1978 GMA produced only 5,876 vehicles. GMA reported loss of USD30 million and the parent company decided to close the factories and the immediate cessation of activities in Argentina in 1978. By the time of its closure, GMA had produced a total of 195,000 cars and 207,000 pickups.

=== Return to operations ===
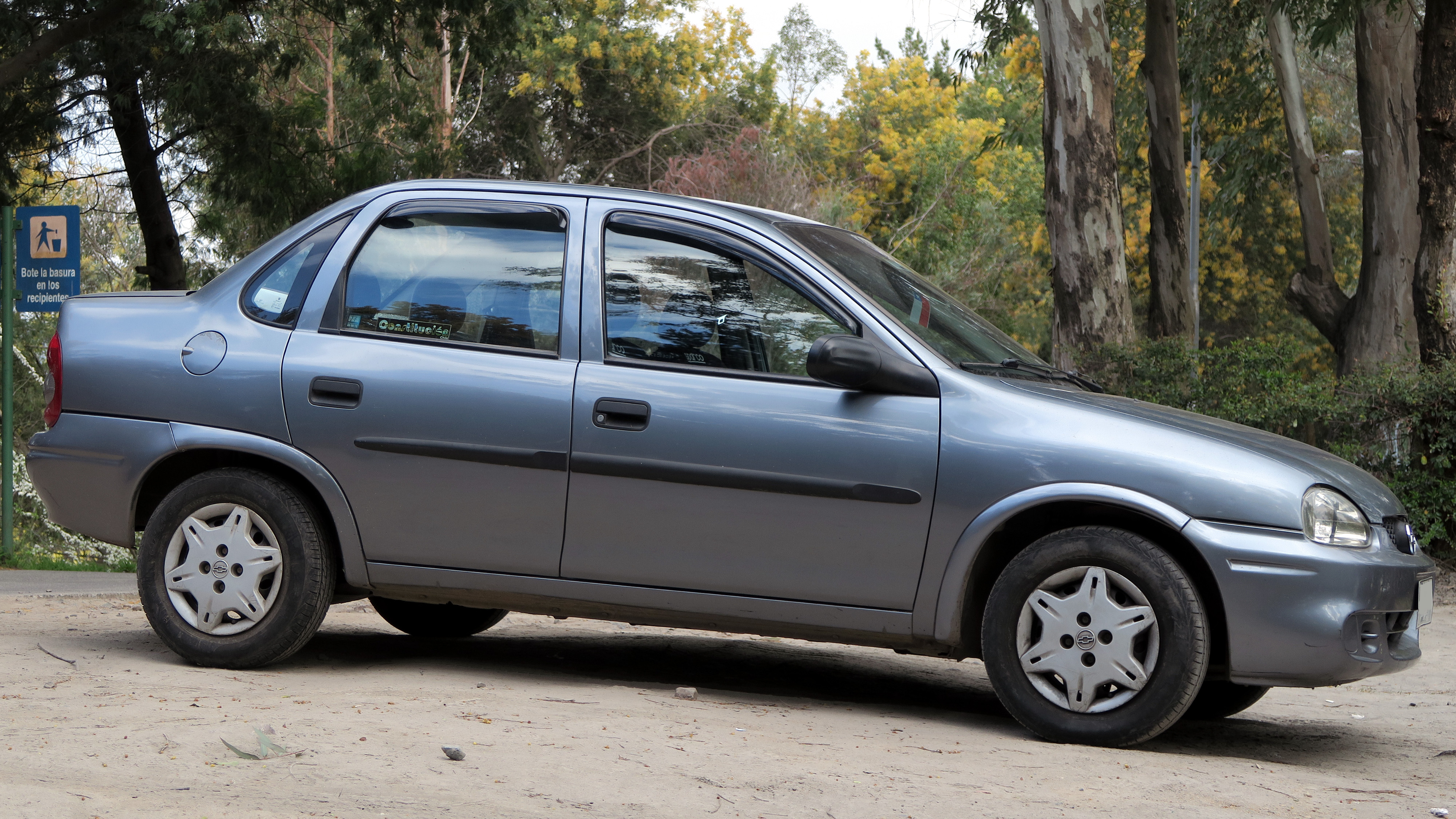
Chevrolet Corsa was the first model launched by GM after its return to Argentina. It became very popular, with more than 650,000 units produced

In 1985, Argentine company Sevel (that had manufactured Fiat and Peugeot in its factory of El Palomar) signed an agreement with General Motors to produce the C-10 pickup under license. The pickup was manufactured in Estación Ferreyra, a city in Córdoba Province. The C-10 was equipped with an Indenor XDII engine by Peugeot. Production ceased in 1991, when the agreement expired.

Finally, GMA returned in 1994 to build the D-20 pickup, a replacement for the C-10 series. The original project also included the production of 25,000 within a year, apart from exporting 19,000 to Mercosur affiliates. At a cost of near USD300 million, a new factory was built in Alvear, near Rosario, Santa Fe. It opened in 1997, where the first model, the Chevrolet Corsa (rebranded from the original Opel model). That same year, production of Silverado pickup also began in Alvear. By October 2007, 500,000 Corsa had been produced in Argentina, reaching to 650,000 in March 2009.

In late 2008, GMA came up with a project to a new vehicle fully developed in the region. As a result, "GM Mercosur" (a new company that amalgamated Argentine and Brazilian GM subsidiaries) was established. The model, named "Chevrolet Agile", was a subcompact car produced in Alvear.

The second generation of the Chevrolet Corsa appeared in 2010 and was named Classic, with two versions, sedan and wagon. The 3-door Corsa was discontinued, being replaced by the Chevrolet Celta, imported from Brazil. The Classic wagon was produced until 2012 while the 4-door lasted until 2016. The Agile was also discontinued in 2016. They were replaced by Chevrolet Prisma and Chevrolet Onix respectively, both produced in Brazil.

As of August 2020, Chevrolet Cruze was the only sedan fully-produced in Argentina. In April 2022 the Tracker, a subcompact crossover SUV which had been imported from Brazil, began to be produced in Argentina at the General Alvear factory in Santa Fe Province. Nevertheless, GMA did not officially announce this until June 2022.

== Produced models ==
List of fully-manufactured models by General Motors Argentina. In case the country of origin's marque differs from the Argentine model, it is indicated.

=== Current models ===
Marque	Name	Origin	Type	Release	Image
Chevrolet	Tracker	BRA	SUV	2022–present	

=== Past models ===
Marque	Local name	Orig. name	Origin	Type	Produced	Image
Chevrolet	C-10 (Note: Named "Apache" until 1967, when took the name "Brava".)	C/K series	USA	Pickup truck	1960–1978	
Chevrolet	400	1962 Chevy II	USA	Sedan	1962–1974	
Chevrolet	Chevy (Note: The original US name "Nova" was discarded to avoid mocking about the name.)	1968 Nova	USA	Sedan	1969–1978	
Opel	K 180 (Note: Derived from the Opel Kadett C.)	Opel Kadett C	GER	Sedan	1974–1978	
Chevrolet	D-20	D-20	BRA	Pickup truck	1993–1997	
Chevrolet	Silverado	Silverado	USA	Pickup truck	1997–2000	
Chevrolet	Corsa / Classic	Opel Corsa	GER	Sedan	1997–2016	
Chevrolet	Grand Blazer	Tahoe	USA	SUV	1999–2000	
Chevrolet	Grand Vitara	Suzuki Vitara (Note: Rebrand of the Suzuki model.)	JPN	SUV	2000–2011	
Chevrolet	Agile	Agile	BRA	Sedan	2009–2016	
Chevrolet	Cruze	Cruze	USA	Compact	2016–2023	

== Imported models ==
All of the Chevrolet brand, except where indicates:

=== GMODC ===
The departure of the General Motors company from Argentina left its brands without official representation in the country. By 1980, the General Motors Overseas Distribution Corporation (GMODC) imported some of the brands it produced in different parts of the world.

=== Chevrolet ===
- Blazer
- Camaro
- Caprice
- Chevette
- Citation
- El Camino
- Malibu
- Monte Carlo
- Monza
- Pickup C/K
- Pickup C-20
- Silverado
- Van

=== Cadillac ===
- Seville
- Eldorado

=== Buick ===
- Regal
- Skylark

=== Oldsmobile ===
- Firenza
- 98 Regency
- Cutlass
- Delta 88
- Omega

=== Opel ===
- Rekord
- Monza
- Manta

=== Pontiac ===
- Phoenix
- Firebird

=== Isuzu ===
- KB
- Gemini
- TL

=== Saehan ===
- Royale

=== Cars ===
- Astra
- Aveo
- Chevette
- Celta
- Cobalt
- Sonic
- Impala
- Monza
- Kadett
- Ipanema
- Cavalier
- Corsa Tigra
- Spark
- Corvair
- Beretta
- Onix
- Omega
- Prisma
- Corvette
- Vectra

=== SUVs ===
- Blazer
- Captiva
- Captiva PHEV
- Equinox
- Sonic
- Spark EUV
- Tracker
- Trailblazer

=== Panel vans ===
- Combo

=== MPVs ===
- Zafira
- Meriva
- Spin

=== Pickups ===
- Avalanche
- Montana (2023–)
- S-10
- Silverado

=== Trucks ===
- Kodiak

=== Vans ===
- Lumina APV
- Astro
