= Chevrolet D-20 =

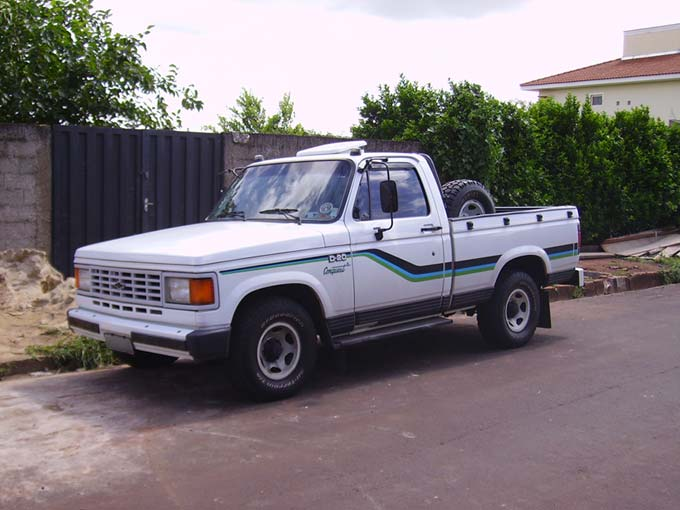
- 1992 Chevrolet D-20 pickup

Overview
- Manufacturer: Chevrolet (General Motors)
- Also called: Chevrolet B-10 (Middle East); GMC B-10 (Middle East)
- Production: 1985-1996 (pickup); 1989-1994 (SUV)
- Assembly: Brazil; Argentina (Santa Isabel, Córdoba)

Body and chassis
- Class: Full-size pickup truck
- Layout: Front-engine, rear-wheel-drive
- Related: Chevrolet Bonanza; Chevrolet Veraneio; Chevrolet C/K (third generation)

Powertrain
- Engine: A-20/C-20 (ethanol/petrol): 4.1 L Turbo Thrift 250 OHV I6; D-20 (diesel): 3.9 L Perkins Q20B4 I4; 4.0 L Maxion S4 I4; 4.0 L Maxion S4T turbo I4
- Transmission: 4/5-speed manual

Dimensions
- Length: Single cab: 4,820 mm (189.8 in); Crew cab: 5,340 mm (210.2 in)
- Width: 2,000 mm (78.7 in)
- Height: 1,880 mm (74.0 in)
- Kerb weight: 2,040–2,290 kg (4,497–5,049 lb)

Chronology
- Predecessor: Chevrolet Série 10
- Successor: Chevrolet Silverado (Chevrolet C1500)

The Chevrolet D-20 is a series of pickup trucks manufactured by Chevrolet in Brazil and Argentina as a complement for the 10 Series. Based on the contemporary American C/K series, the interior was the same but it had a different exterior design which incorporated the Opala headlights and a similar grille. Whilst all models are commonly referred to as D-20, the gasoline model was marketed as the C-20, and an otherwise mechanically identical ethanol-fueled version as the A-20.

Introduced in May 1985, it was only available in a regular cab pickup configuration, engine options consisted of a 4.1-litre gasoline or ethanol engine (C-20 or A-20, respectively) or a 3.9-litre Perkins diesel (D-20). There were two trim levels: base and Custom, custom being the most luxurious model. In 1986 a crew cab pickup was introduced. In 1989 a 4x4 model was introduced. In 1991, the Perkins diesel engine was replaced with the Maxion S4 diesel making 66 kW (88 hp) and the turbocharged Maxion S4T making 92 kW (123 hp); also, power windows, locks and mirrors and an alarm were introduced.

== 1993 update ==
For the 1993 model year, the series was given a new grille and headlights, a hydraulic clutch system and a variable steering system, marketed as "Servotronic", was introduced, which made the steering harder to turn as the vehicle went faster, also the instrument panel was redesigned, two separate clusters replaced the old individual round instruments. In 1995, the S4T was updated, now producing 110 kW (147 hp). This version of the D-20 was called Turbo Plus, it was equipped with ABS in the rear wheels, also the C-20 received multi-port fuel injection this year, now producing 102 kW (138 hp).

== 4x4 Version ==
Introduced in 1989, the 4x4 model was available as an A-20, C-20, or D-20, in regular or crew cab configurations. They had independent front suspension, automatic vacuum hub locks, and a lever-activated, 2-speed transfer case and a rear limited-slip differential. This model was short lived, being discontinued for the succeeding model year (1990) because of reliability issues with the front universal joints. The company which designed the system for GM, QT Engenharia e Equipamentos, was unable to design a constant velocity joint to replace the very fragile universal joints at the front axle. Several trucks broke their universal joints during the press introduction, including one at the hands of a GM employee.

== SUV Models ==
All SUVs were mechanically identical to the pickup counterparts

The Série 20-based Veraneio was introduced in 1989, replacing the Série 10-based generation, available as a 5-door SUV. It was discontinued in 1994.

The Bonanza was introduced in 1990, available as a 3-door SUV. It was discontinued in 1994.

== Production ==
While most production occurred in Brazil, some trucks were built in Argentina from CKD kits.

Production ceased in 1996: it was replaced with the Chevrolet Silverado, a North American spec C1500 with local powertrain options.
