= Chevrolet C/K =

American truck series by General Motors

Chevrolet and GMC C/K
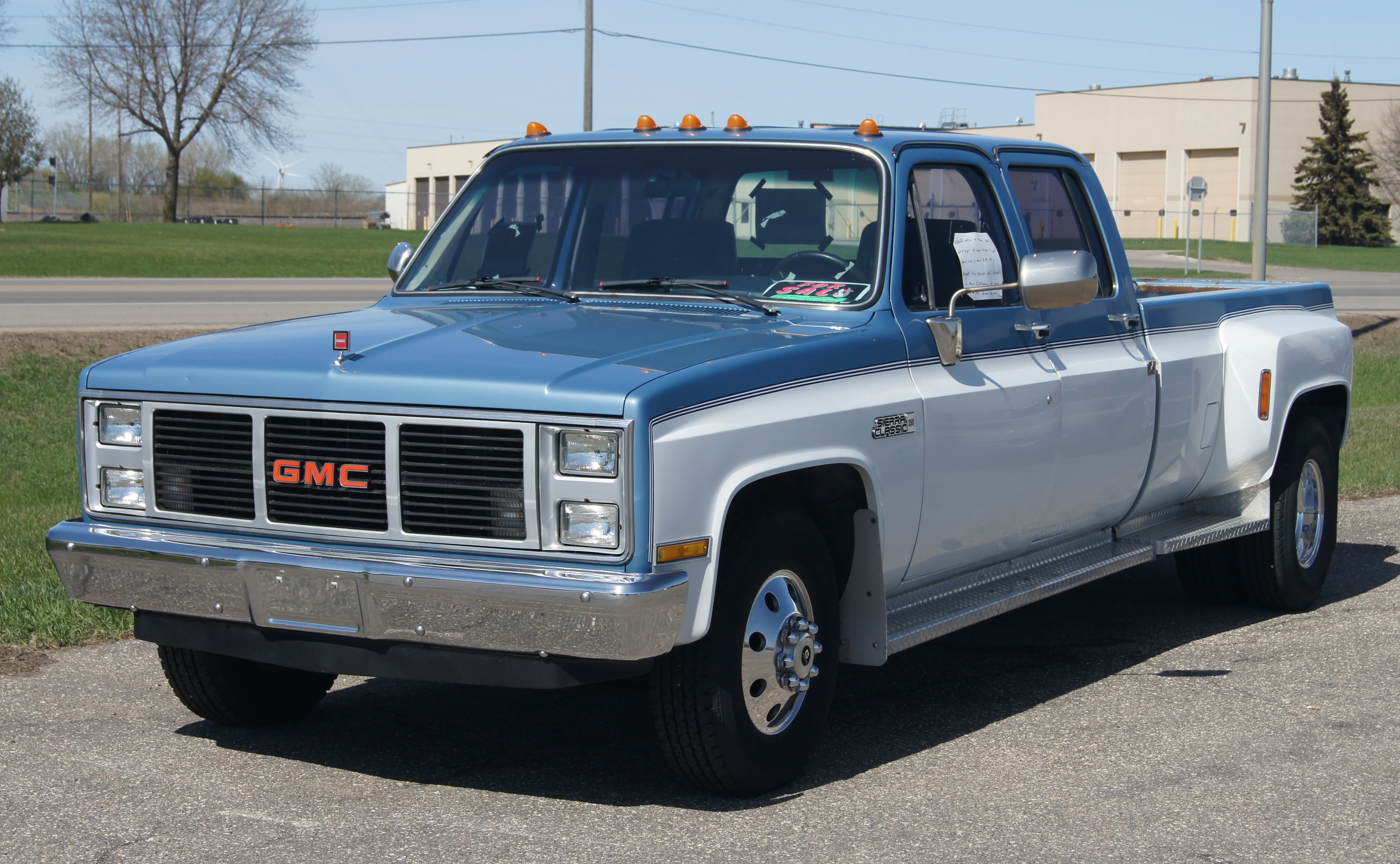
- 1986 GMC C-3500 Sierra Classic 3+3

Overview
- Manufacturer: General Motors
- Also called: GMC C/K; Chevrolet/GMC Full-Size Pickup; Chevrolet Silverado (1975–2002); GMC Sierra (1972–2002)
- Production: 1959–2002 (United States); 1959–2000 (Canada); 1965–2006 (Mexico); 1964–2001 (Brazil); 1975–1982 (Chile); 1960–1991 (Argentina)
- Model years: 1960–2000 (C/K pickup trucks)

Body and chassis
- Class: Full-size truck Medium-duty truck

Chronology
- Predecessor: Chevrolet Task Force
- Successor: Chevrolet Silverado/GMC Sierra (pickup trucks); Chevrolet Kodiak/GMC TopKick (medium-duty trucks)

The Chevrolet C/K is a series of trucks that was manufactured by General Motors from the 1960 to 2002 model years. Marketed by both the Chevrolet and GMC divisions, the C/K series encompassed a wide range of vehicles. While most commonly associated with pickup trucks, the model line also included chassis-cab trucks and medium-duty trucks and served as the basis for GM full-size SUVs. Through its entire production, the model line competed directly against the Ford F-Series and the Dodge D series (later the Dodge Ram pickup).

Used for both the model branding and the internal model code, "C" denoted two-wheel drive, while "K" denoted four-wheel drive. Four generations of the C/K series were produced, including the GM monikered second-generation "Action Line" and third-generation "Rounded Line" vehicles (colloquially aka Square-Body trucks). For the fourth-generation (colloquially also known as OBS trucks), Chevrolet kept using the C/K designation while GMC revised its branding, changing to a singular GMC Sierra nameplate (C/K remained as an internal model code).

For South America, the model line was manufactured by General Motors de Argentina from 1960 to 1978, Sevel Argentina from 1986 to 1991, and General Motors Brazil, who produced versions of the model line for Brazil, Argentina, and Chile from 1964 to 2001.

As GM entered the 1990s, the company revised its truck ranges, replacing the medium-duty C/K trucks with the Chevrolet Kodiak/GMC TopKick for 1990. For 1999, GM replaced the fourth-generation C/K pickup trucks with an all-new model line; in line with GMC, Chevrolet dropped the C/K nameplate (in favor of a singular Chevrolet Silverado nameplate). Initially marketed with its successor, the final C/K pickup trucks were produced for the 2000 model year. From 2001 to 2002, the final vehicles of the C/K model line were medium-duty chassis cab trucks for the US market. The C3500HD remained in production until 2006 for the Mexican market.

== First generation (1960–1966) ==
First generation (C/K)
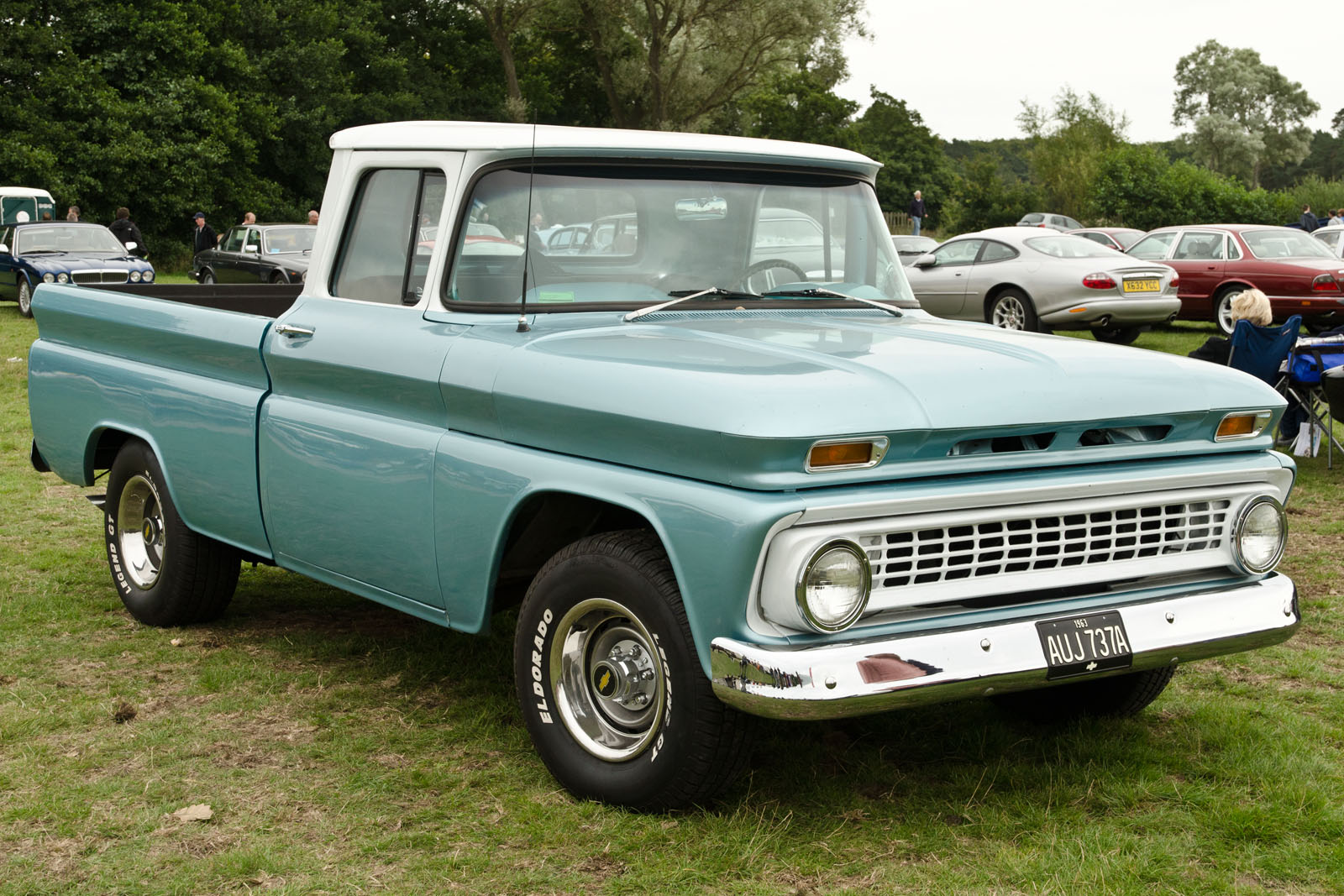
- 1963 Chevrolet K10 Fleetside

Overview
- Model years: 1960–1966

Body and chassis
- Platform: GM C/K
- Related: Chevrolet/GMC Suburban; Chevrolet Veraneio

Launched in the fall of 1959 as a 1960 model, the first-generation C/K debuted a number of design changes for General Motors light-truck design. Replacing the Task Force range, the C/K was developed from the start as a truck chassis, no longer sharing commonality with the GM A-body platform. Though developed as a truck for the sake of durability, the C/K adopted several features from cars into its design to increase its functionality. For pickup trucks, the C/K trucks used a drop-center frame which allowed for a lower cab and lower center of gravity, and independent front suspension was paired with a coil-sprung rear axle. For 1963, front torsion bars were replaced by front coil springs (on two-wheel drive vehicles).

While the first generation would not undergo a comprehensive facelift or update, GM would make a series of gradual changes to the model line through its production. For 1962, the hood was redesigned, with a new windshield and A-pillar added to the cab for 1964.

In a break from General Motors tradition, this is one of the few generations of trucks not given an in-house moniker. The C/K nomenclature was developed by GMC; "C" denoted conventional cab, with "K" standing for 4×4 drive.

== Second generation (1967–1972) ==
Second generation (Action Line)
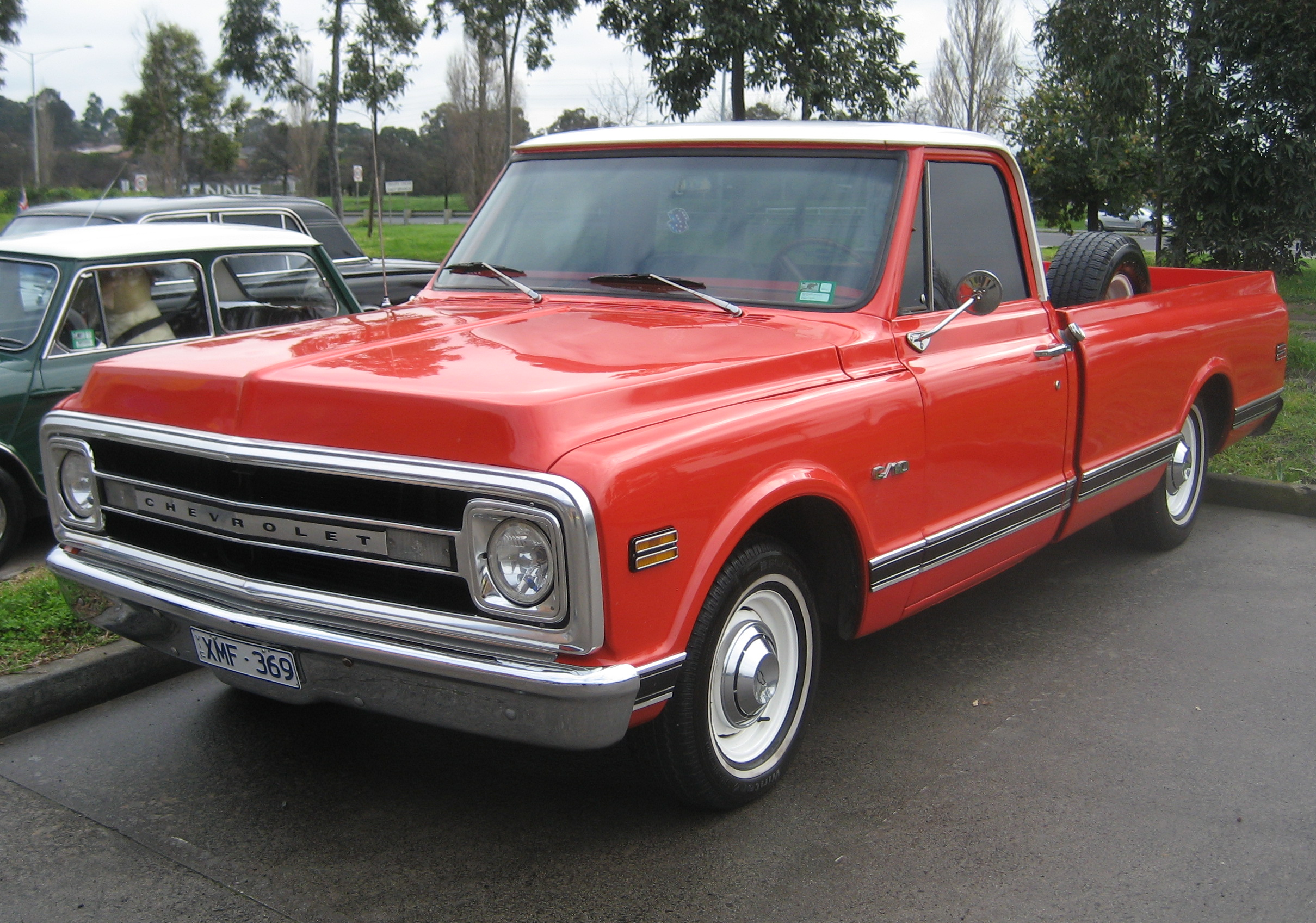
- 1970 Chevrolet C10 Fleetside

Overview
- Model years: 1967–1972

Body and chassis
- Platform: GM C/K (Action Line)
- Related: Chevrolet K5 Blazer/GMC Jimmy; Chevrolet Suburban/GMC Carryall

The second-generation C/K was introduced for the 1967 model year. Designated the "Action Line" generation by General Motors, the C/K largely carried over its drop-center ladder frame and its coil-sprung rear axle, but the body was redesigned from the ground up to improve its capability as a multi-purpose vehicle. Alongside a utilitarian vehicle intended for work or farm use, the C/K was also offered with optional features carried over from Chevrolet sedans, including automatic transmissions, AM/FM radio, carpet, and two-tone paint.

While the Action Line would not undergo a definitive model revision through its production, the series underwent gradual changes on a biannual basis. The drivetrain line underwent multiple revisions, as a large-block V8 was offered for the first time in 1968. After 1969, GM switched entirely to Chevrolet-produced engines for C/K pickup trucks.

This generation marks the debut of the Chevrolet Cheyenne and GMC Sierra nameplates; introduced in 1971 and 1972, respectively, General Motors still uses both nameplates for full-size pickups in current production. The Action-Line pickup also served as the basis of ancestors of modern full-size SUVs, including the Chevrolet K5 Blazer, an open-body off-road vehicle, and the Chevrolet Suburban truck-based station wagon.

For 1973, GM replaced the Action Line trucks with the long-running Rounded Line series; the Action Line trucks are the final C/K trucks offered solely with a two-door cab.

== Third generation (1973–1991) ==
Third generation (Rounded Line)
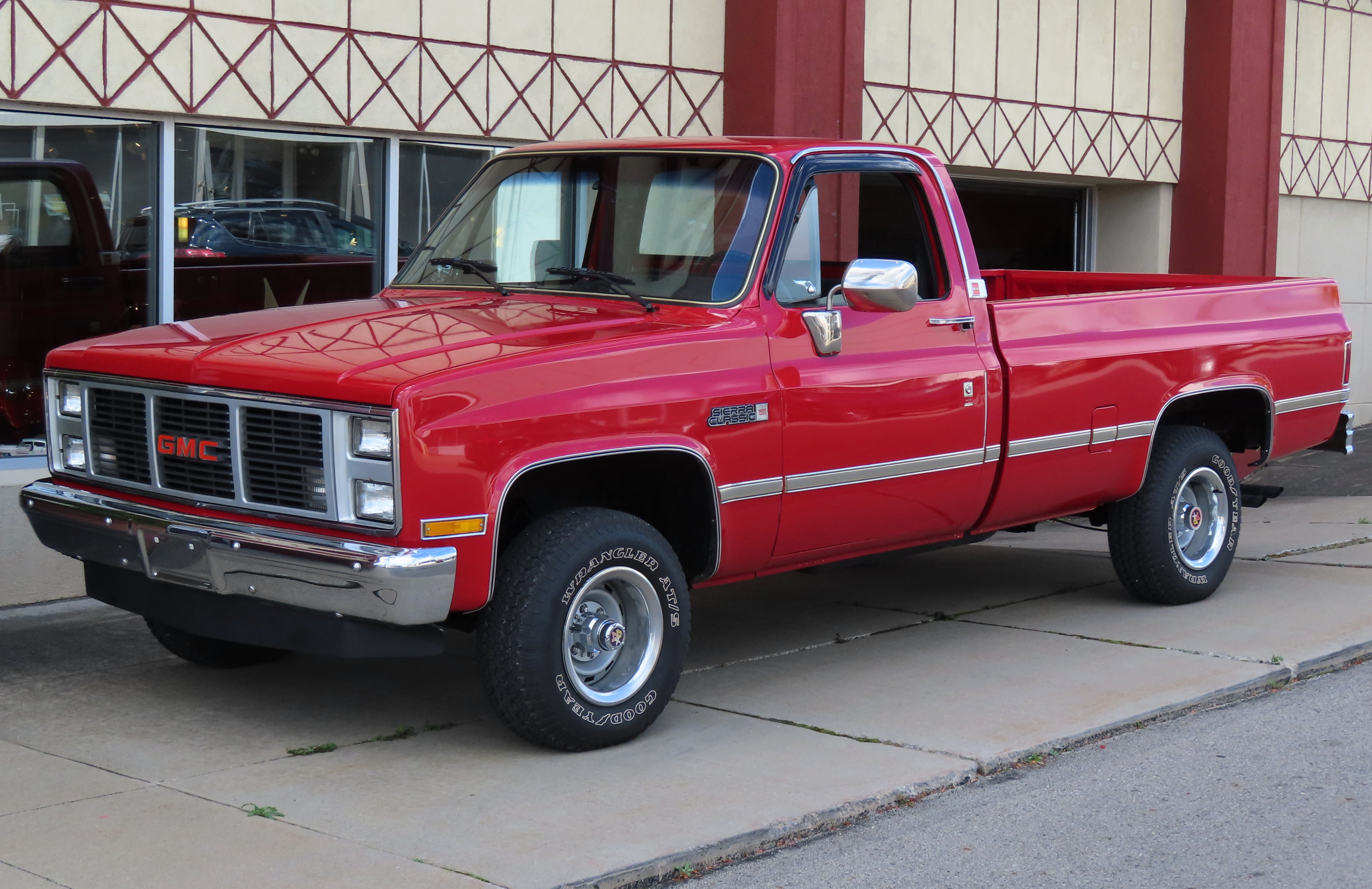
- 1985 GMC K-1500 Sierra Classic

Overview
- Also called: Chevrolet/GMC R/V series
- Model years: 1973–1991

Body and chassis
- Platform: GM C/K (Rounded Line)
- Related: Chevrolet K5 Blazer/GMC Jimmy; Chevrolet/GMC Suburban

The third-generation C/K was introduced for the 1973 model year. Designated the "Rounded Line" generation by General Motors, the C/K grew in size inside and out. As pickup trucks increased in use as personal vehicles, cab features and options moved closer in line with GM sedans (with power windows and power door locks becoming options). To further expand its practicality, a four-door crew cab body was introduced (offering 6-passenger seating).

While relatively straight-lined and boxy in appearance (leading to their "square-body" nickname from the public) the Rounded Line trucks were the first generation of the C/K to be designed with the use of computers and wind tunnels, optimizing the exterior shape for lower drag and improved fuel economy. The chassis was an all-new design (with all trucks receiving a leaf-spring rear suspension); K-Series trucks moved to all-wheel drive (shift-on-the-fly 4×4 was introduced for 1981).

Alongside the introduction of the four-door crew cab, the third generation C/K marked the introduction of a dual rear-wheel pickup truck ("Big Dooley"). For 1978, the C/K became the first American full-size pickup truck sold with a diesel engine (a 5.7L Oldsmobile diesel V8); a 6.2L diesel V8 was introduced for 1982. This generation also marks the first use of the Chevrolet Silverado nameplate (in use for Chevrolet full-size trucks today).

The Rounded Line generation is the longest-produced version of the C/K model line, produced for 18 model years. For 1987, it was renamed the R/V series (to accommodate the fourth-generation C/K marketed alongside it) and was gradually phased out through the 1991 model year.

== Fourth generation C/K / first generation Sierra (1988–2002) ==
Fourth generation (GMT400)
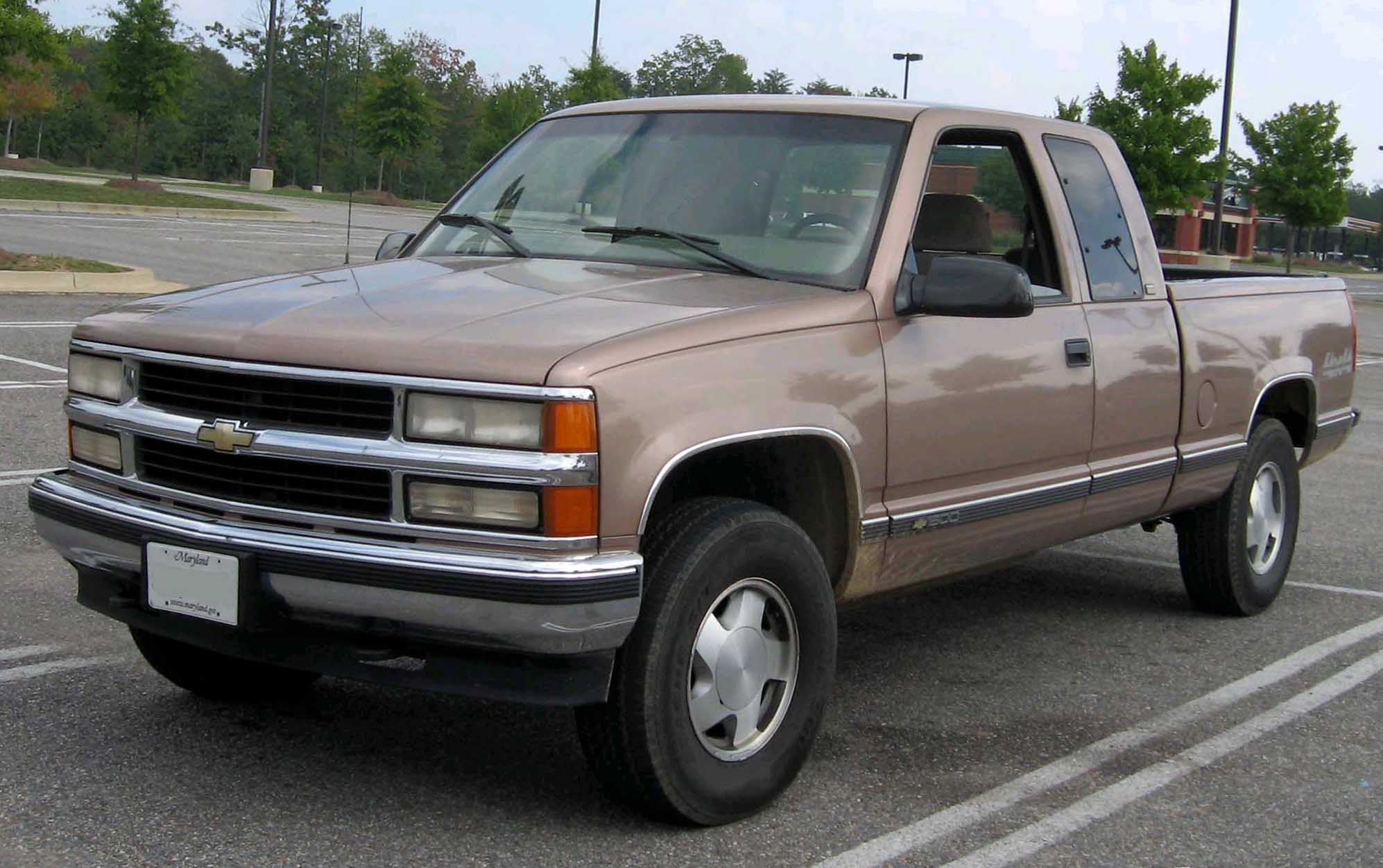
- 1995-1996 Chevrolet K1500 Silverado

Overview
- Model years: 1988–2002

Body and chassis
- Platform: GM GMT400 platform
- Related: Chevrolet/GMC Suburban; Chevrolet K5 Blazer/Chevrolet Tahoe/GMC Yukon/Cadillac Escalade

The fourth-generation C/K was introduced in April 1987 for the 1988 model year. Known officially by its GMT400 internal codename (GM never assigned this model line a generational moniker), these are informally known as the OBS (Old or Original Body Style). Slightly smaller in cab dimensions, the fourth-generation C/K increased interior space over its predecessor. After trailing Ford and Dodge by over a decade, GM introduced the C/K in an extended-cab configuration. For nearly five years, the fourth-generation C/K was sold alongside its R/V series predecessor, as the crew cab pickup (which served as the basis of the Suburban SUV) was not released until the 1992 model year.

In a branding change, the C/K nomenclature became exclusive to Chevrolet, as all GMC pickups became Sierras (GMC retained the C/K nomenclature for its internal model codes). Chevrolet introduced several specialized variants of the C/K series, including the work-oriented W/T 1500, off-road Z71, and the high-performance 454SS. Between one-ton trucks and the Kodiak medium-duty trucks, Chevrolet and GMC offered the C3500HD chassis cab for commercial use.

For 1995, the fourth-generation C/K underwent a mid-cycle revision, adding a driver-side airbag (dual airbags became standard for 1997). For 1996, the extended cab was redesigned, adding a rear-hinged passenger-side third door on select 1500 models.

For the 1999 model year, to accommodate the introduction of the GMT800-chassis Chevrolet Silverado/GMC Sierra, the fourth-generation C/K was renamed as the Chevrolet Silverado Classic and GMC Sierra Classic. After the 2000 model year, C/K pickup trucks were discontinued. GM produced the heavy-duty C3500HD chassis cab as the final version of the C/K model family through the 2002 model year.

== South American production (1964–2001) ==
General Motors Brazil produced three generations of light-duty Chevrolet pickup trucks from 1964 to 2001. Developed specifically for South American production, each version was also derived (to various extents) from the contemporary version of its American C/K counterpart. The model line also included truck-based station wagon/SUVs (similar to the Chevrolet Suburban).

In January 2002, GM Brazil ended production of full-size pickup trucks, concentrating its production towards the Chevrolet S-10 and car-based pickup trucks.

=== 1964–1984 ===
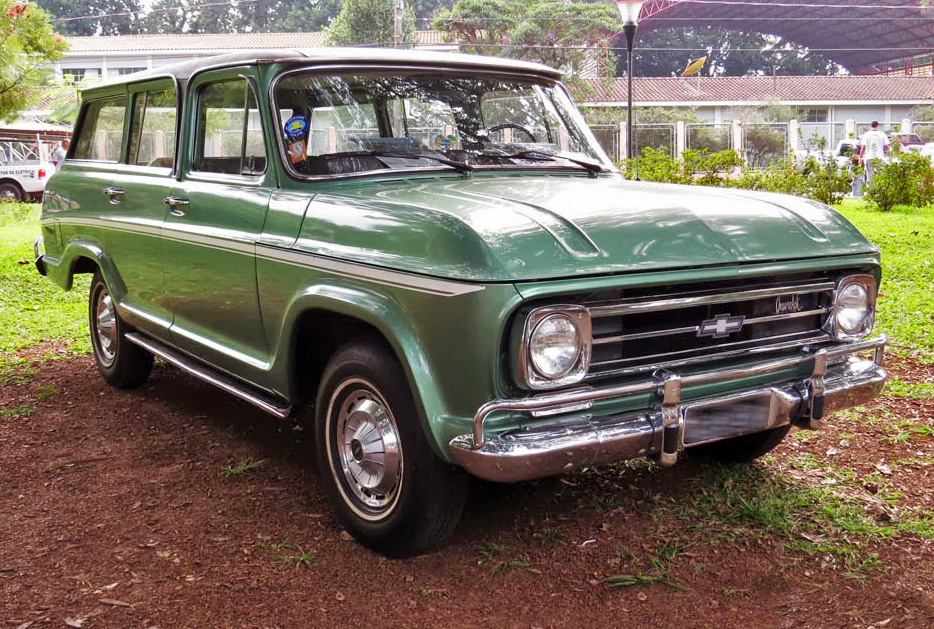
1970s–1980s Chevrolet Veraneio

In 1964, GM Brazil launched its first line of light trucks designed in Brazil, the Chevrolet C-series pickup truck; in line with the Chevrolet Suburban, the model line was sold in a wagon configuration, renamed from C-1416 to Chevrolet Veraneio in 1969. Styled with an exterior exclusive to Brazil, the model line shared its instrument panel with the first-generation Chevrolet C/K of 1960–1966. Nearly a decade before its American counterpart, a four-door "double cab" was offered alongside the standard two-door configuration, sharing its doors with the Veraneio wagon/SUV.

The model line was launched with a 261 cubic-inch inline-six (derived from the Chevrolet "Stovebolt" engine); this engine was replaced in 1971 by a 250 cubic-inch inline-6 from the Chevrolet Opala. In 1976, the standard gasoline engine for the C-10 became a 2.5-liter inline-four. A four-cylinder diesel, the 3.8-liter Perkins 4.236, was introduced for 1978 in the D10 pickup. For 1981, the engine line was reduced to two, with a 4.1-liter inline-six becoming offered in gasoline and ethanol-fuel versions (C-10 and A-10) alongside the Perkins 4.236 (D10).

=== 1985–1996 ===
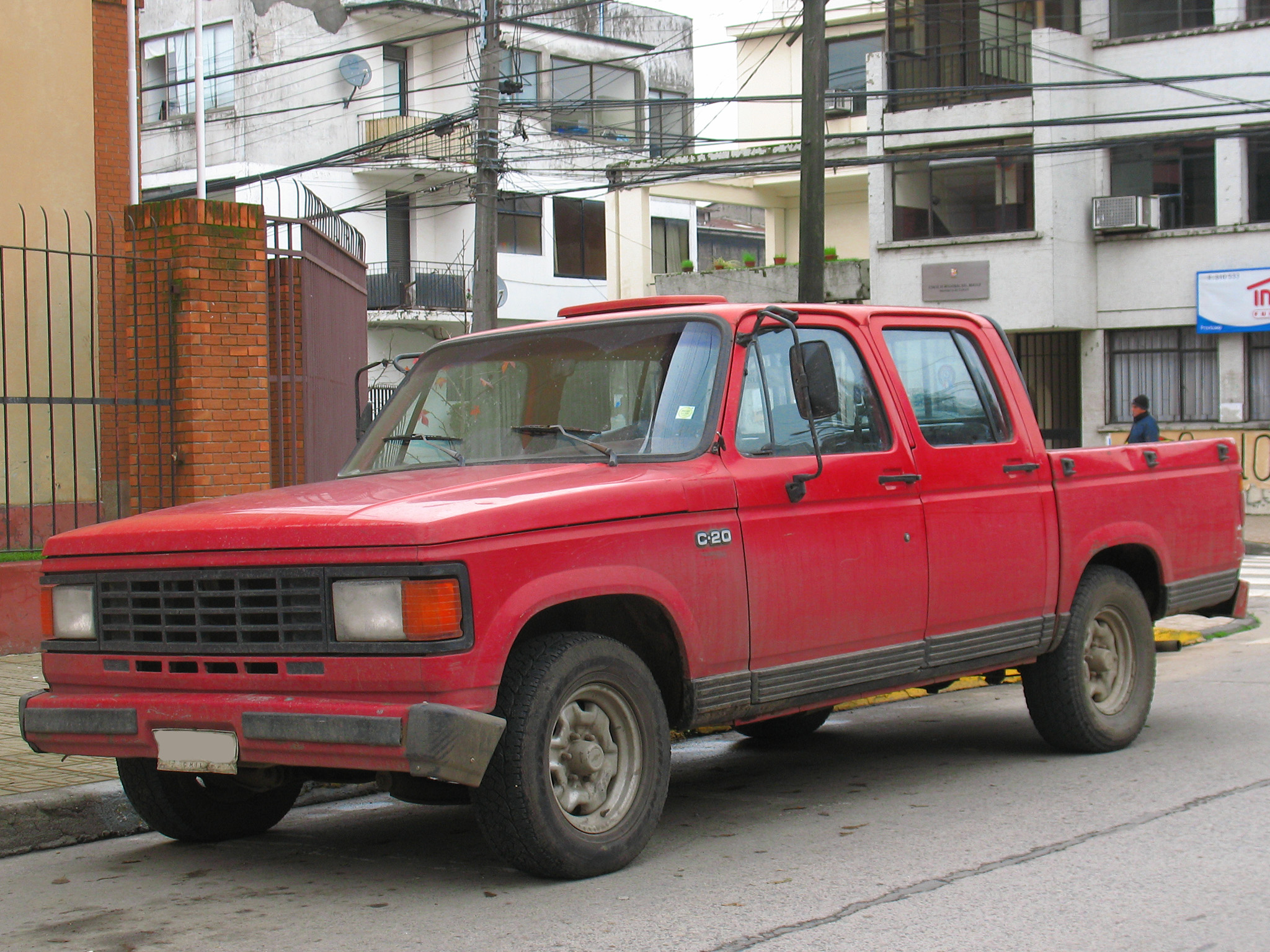
1989 Chevrolet C-20 double cab

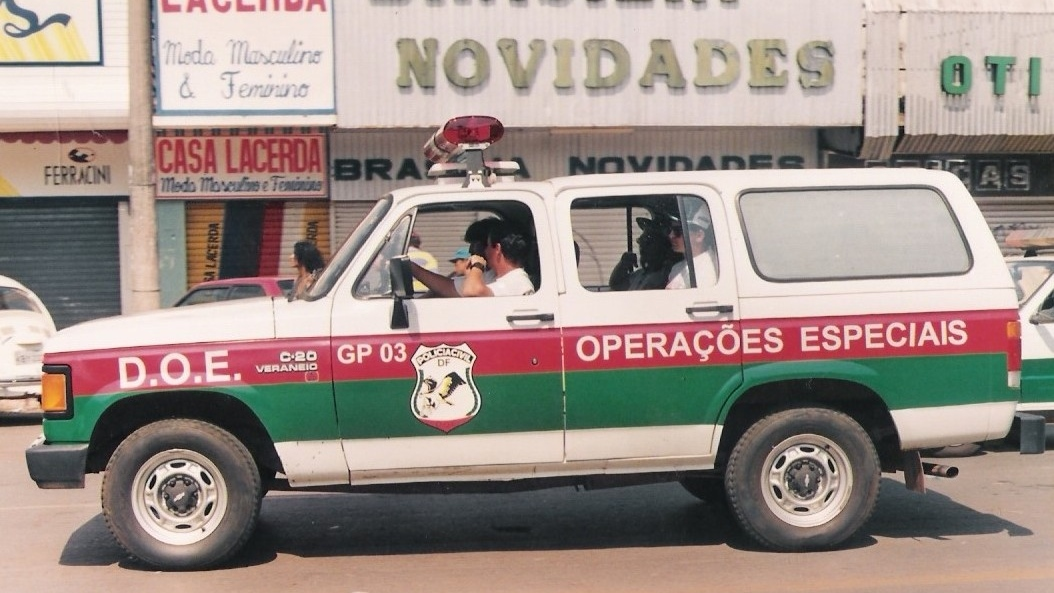
1990s Chevrolet Veraneio C-20 in use by Brazilian law enforcement

For 1985 production, GM Brazil introduced the 20-series model line as its second generation of light trucks. Sharing its cab structure with the "Rounded Line" generation, the 20-series received its own front fascia (sharing headlights with the Opala) and larger taillamps than its American counterpart. Far more advanced in design than its utilitarian predecessor, the 20-series carried over little more than its powertrains from the previous generation. In addition to 20-series pickup trucks, GM Brazil offered a full line of Chevrolet medium- and heavy-duty trucks derived from the "Rounded Line" cab.

Again offered in single and double cabs (introduced in 1986), the C-20 and A-20 (ethanol) received a 4.1-liter inline-six, with the D-20 receiving the Perkins Q20B inline-four diesel (a revised and renamed 4.236, renamed the Maxion S4 for 1990). In contrast to its American counterpart, the 20-series was offered nearly exclusively with 2-wheel drive; a 4×4 version was offered for 1989 and was withdrawn before the end of the model year, following poor reliability of its drivetrain.

For 1988, the Veraneio wagon/SUV was redesigned for the first time since its introduction, adopting the 20-series body structure; the four-door was joined by the two-door Chevrolet Bonanza. With the exception of its taillamps and front fascia, the Veraneio adopted an appearance close to the Chevrolet/GMC Suburban; the Bonanza was proportioned similar to the Chevrolet K5 Blazer (though fitted with two-wheel drive and a permanent roof).

For 1992, the 20-series underwent a minor exterior revision, again sharing its headlights with the Opala (higher-trim vehicles shared wheels with GMT400 pickup trucks); the interior underwent a redesign, adopting a redesigned instrument panel.

For 1996, the model line adopted the fuel-injected version of the 4.1L six-cylinder from the Chevrolet Omega, ending its use of carbureted engines.

=== 1997–2001 ===
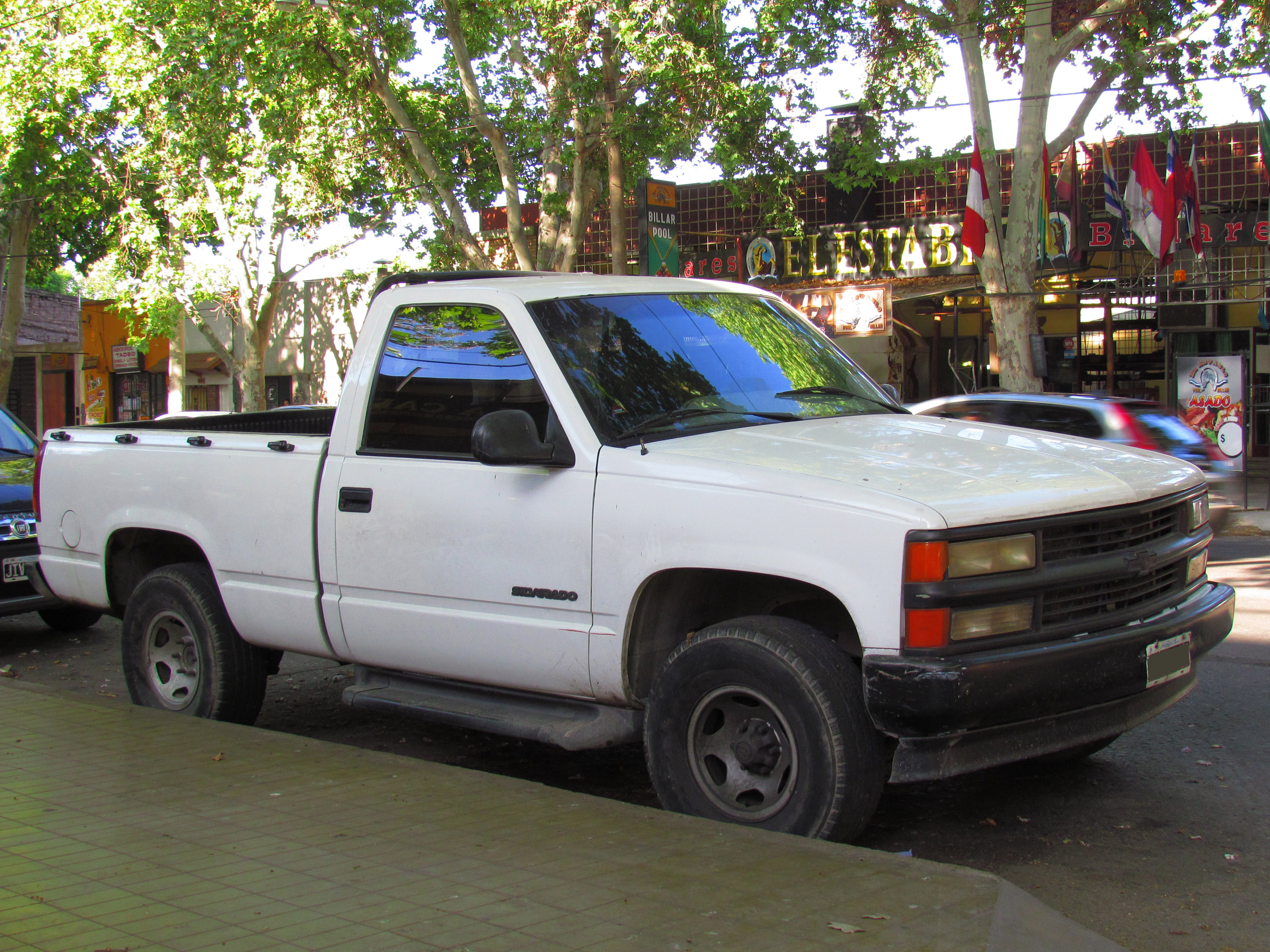
1998 Chevrolet Silverado (Argentina)

For 1997, the 20-series (based on the 1973 "Rounded Line" pickups) was retired, with GM Brazil introducing the Argentine-produced Chevrolet Silverado. In contrast to the previous two generations of Brazilian Chevrolet trucks, the Chevrolet Silverado was no longer a market-exclusive design; the Silverado was visually aligned to the American-market GMT400 pickup. The fuel filler position is the most easily noticeable difference between the Mercosur model (on the rearmost right corner of the pick-up bed) and the North American model (on the left bedside panel, more upfront), as the Mercosur model has the fuel tank behind the rear axle while the North American has a saddle tank mounted to the left frame rail Source . Offered only as a two-door C2500 with a standard-length bed, the Silverado was fitted with locally sourced powertrains, including a 138 hp 4.1L inline-six (from the previous C-20/A-20 and the Chevrolet Omega) and a MWM-produced 168 hp 4.2L turbodiesel inline-six.

The locally designed Veraneio and Bonanza were discontinued; in 1998, GM Brazil began production of the Chevrolet Grand Blazer, a renamed Chevrolet Tahoe.

For 2000 production, production of the Silverado shifted from Argentina to Brazil. Alongside the withdrawal of the Grand Blazer (in favor of the smaller S-10 Blazer), the Silverado adopted a D-20 suffix, in order to benefit from the popularity of its predecessor.. During 2001, Chevrolet withdrew the 4.1-liter gasoline six-cylinder from the Silverado D-20; it was the final vehicle to use this engine.

After many years of declining market share in the truck segment, GM Brazil produced the final Silverado D-20 in January 2002.
