= Chevrolet 400 =

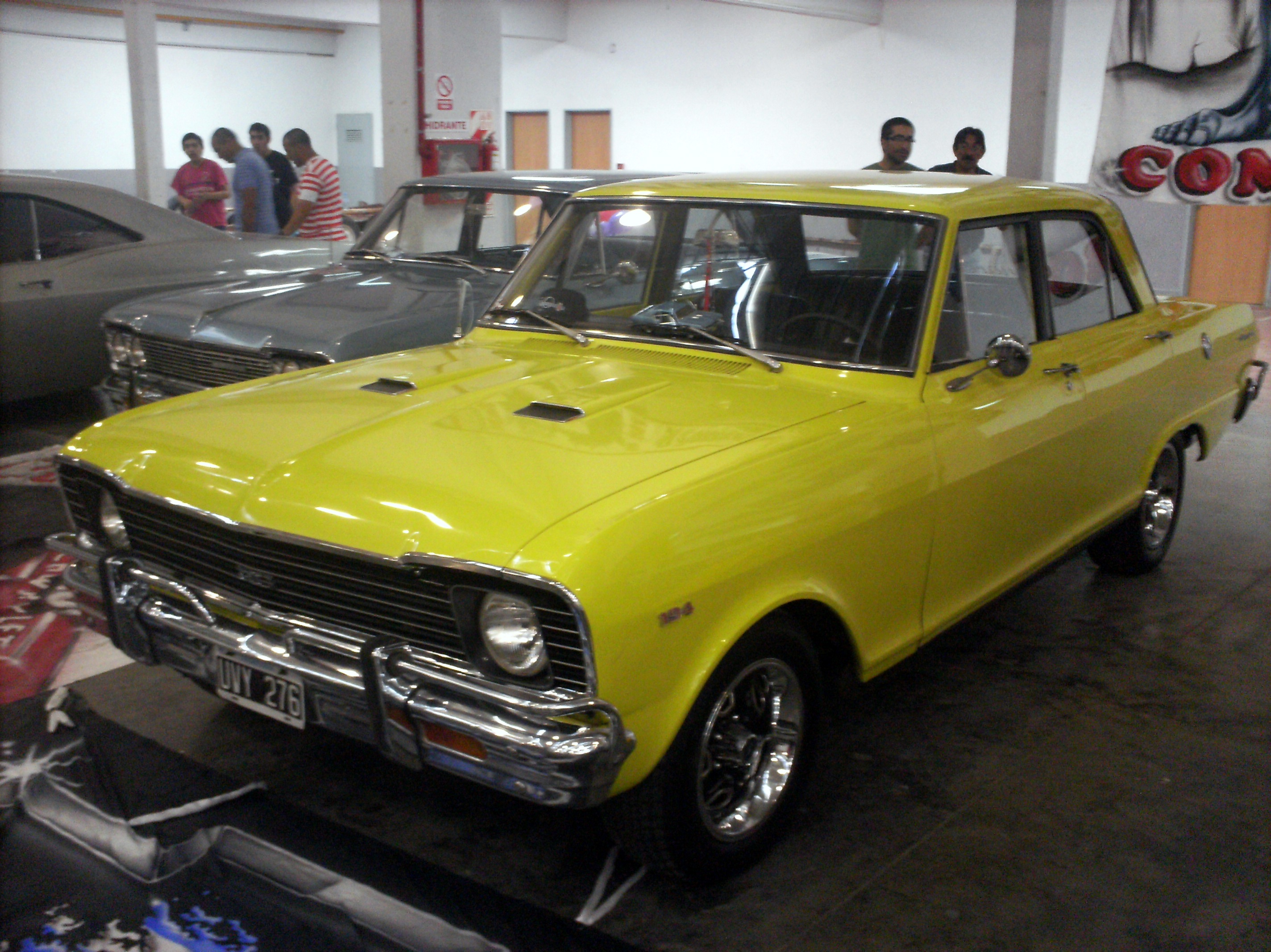

Overview
- Manufacturer: General Motors de Argentina
- Production: 1962–1974
- Assembly: Argentina: San Martín, Buenos Aires

Body and chassis
- Class: Executive car
- Body style: 4-door sedan
- Layout: Front engine, rear-wheel drive
- Related: Chevrolet Nova; Chevrolet Chevy II / Nova

Chronology
- Successor: Chevrolet Chevy Malibu

The Chevrolet 400 was a compact car made by General Motors de Argentina from 1962 to 1974. The "400" was General Motors's reply to Ford and Chrysler after those companies introduced the first compact cars to Argentina, the Ford Falcon and Valiant II respectively.

The "400" was based on the Chevrolet model known in United States as Chevy II (and later "Chevrolet Nova"). Only the 4-door sedan version was manufactured in the country, although U.S. versions included a complete line of body styles, including a hardtop coupe, convertible coupe, 2-door sedan, and station wagon.

== History ==
=== The Beginning ===
In the 1960s, the auto industry was revolutionized with the emergence of a new concept vehicle: the compact car. In Argentina, a radical change occurred in the structures of large factories, such that Chrysler began to manufacture the "Valiant II" while Ford produced the "Falcon".

General Motors's response was a car derived from the U.S. market, the Chevy II, traded as "Chevrolet 400" in Argentina. The first version of the 400 included round headlights on its front grille and was equipped with Chevrolet's ubiquitous overhead-valve, six-cylinder engine of 194 cubic inches or 3179 cc.

=== Chevrolet 400 Argentina ===
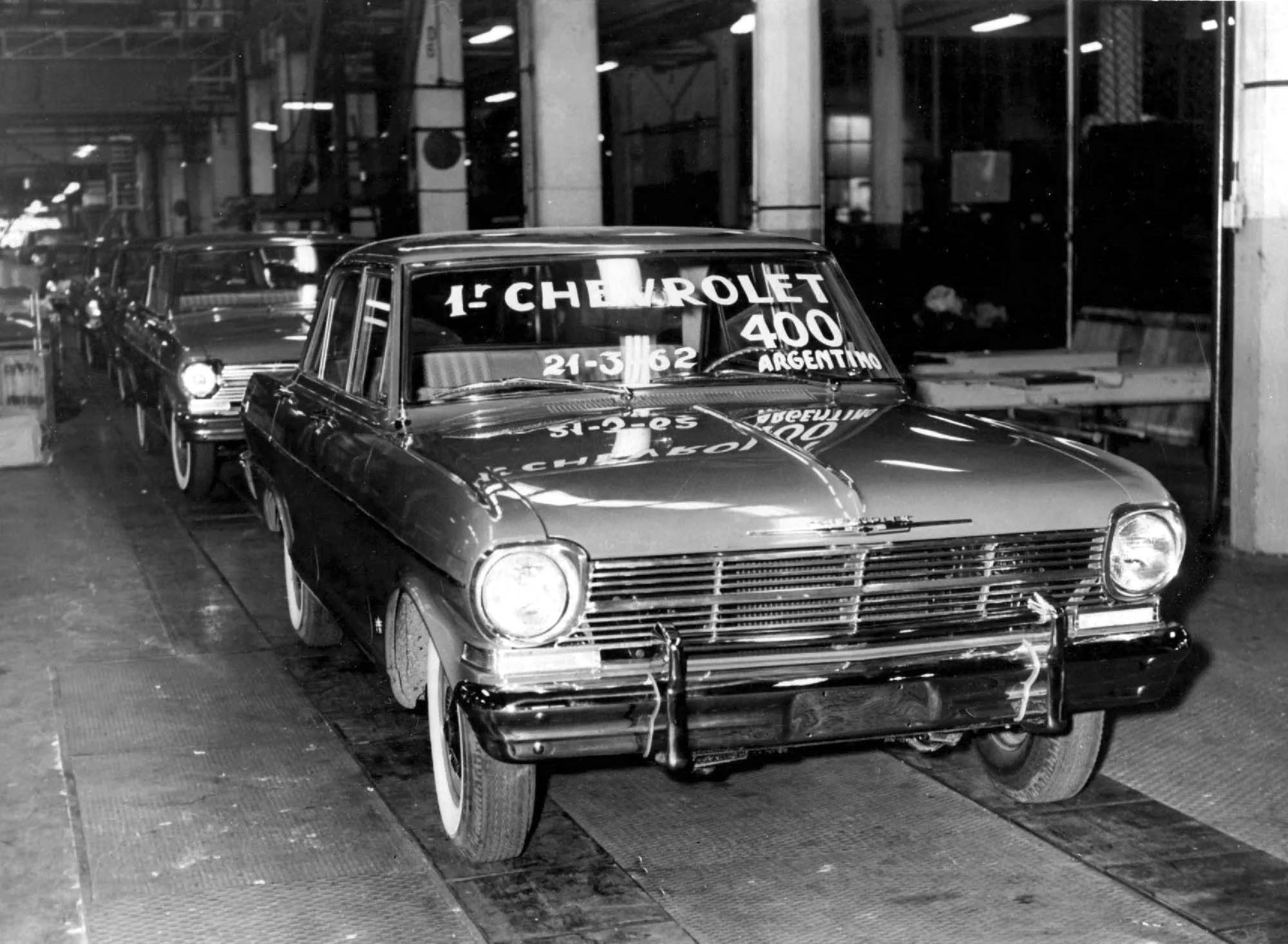
A Chevrolet 400 in the assembly line of GM Argentina

The first Chevrolet 400 was manufactured on March 21, 1962. As cited above the car was equipped with an engine named "194" which had a displacement of 194 cubic inches (or 3179 cc). The 400 was offered in two models: the "Special" which was a luxury sedan and the "Base", most of which were used as taxi. Its engine came equipped with a single-barrel Rochester BC carburetor, while the Special had a Holley. Both engines had 106 HP. The models came with a 3-speed manual transmission.

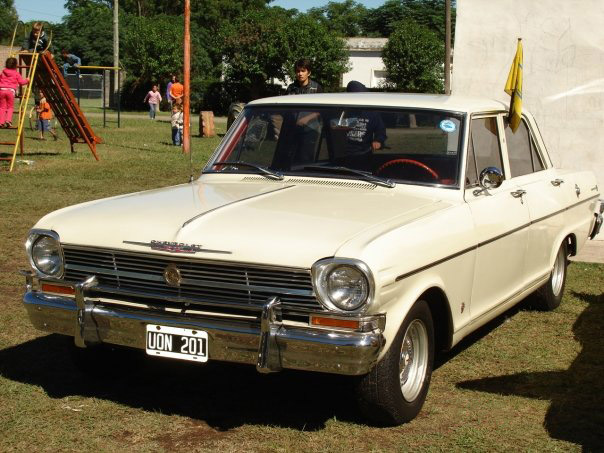
1962 Chevrolet 400

In 1964, GM released the "Super", which showed a slight touch up on its front portion showing a whole new grille. The Super premiered the new inline "230" six-cylinder engine (3769 cc), 127 HP and a Holley R2751 carburetor, and equipped with 3-speed manual transmission as usual.

In 1967 Chevrolet launched the 400 "Super Sport", the most aggressive version of the line that featured a more powerful engine and an innovative gearbox. These had the 250 cubic-inch OHV Six, and ZF 4-speed selector with trigger shifter, released just this year. The Super Sport, equipped with this engine-box duo, produced 155 HP. It also came equipped with a 2-barrel Holley RX 7214-A carburetor. It also brought updated front-end styling with quad round headlights.

That same year, racer Carlos Alberto Pairetti was crowned champion of Turismo Carretera driving a prototype Chevrolet nicknamed "The Orange Thunder" ('El trueno naranja' in Spanish), the name adopted due to the color of the unit, equipped with a 250 engine with a transmission similar to the Chevrolet Corvette.

=== The end of the Chevrolet 400 ===
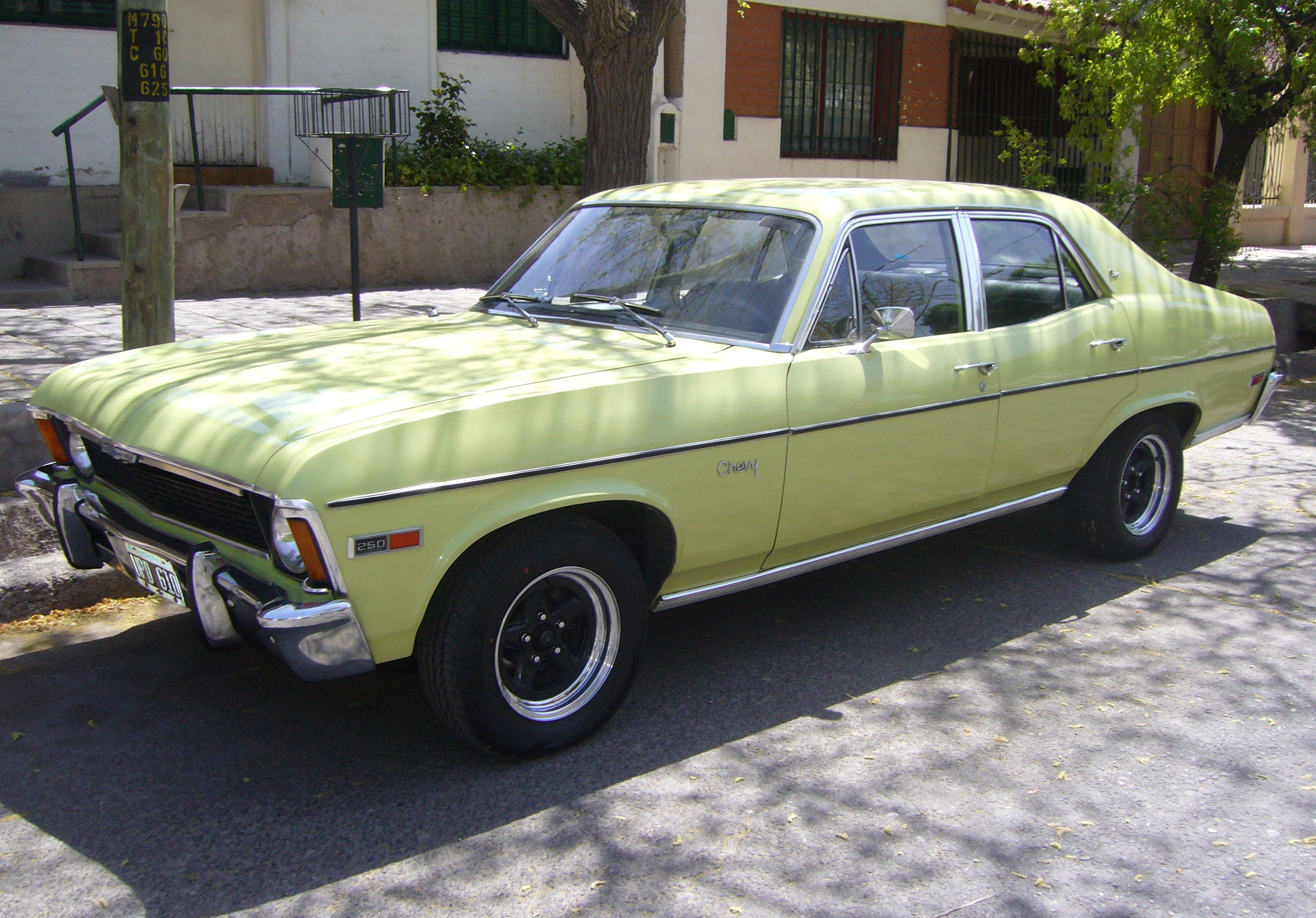
The 400 was replaced by the Chevy (pictured) based on the American Nova

However, in 1969, the "Chevy" (based on the 1968 Chevy II Nova), a sports car that became the most famous in the history of the brand. The idea was to offer a luxury car with sports features on one side (Chevy 400), and sport on the other (Chevy). What was not taken into account is that sales of the Chevy increased at the expense of its predecessor, the 400, causing a competition between both models. While the 400 was produced alongside the Chevy, the 400's North American counterpart ceased production after the 1967 model year.

It was then that to avoid more of a problem, in 1972, "Rally Sport" was launched, which was cheaper than the Chevrolet 400. The same came with three engine options: the "194", the "230" and "250", which came equipped with a carburetor Holey R 2751, and coupled to the 4-speed box. These versions came with different shades of color characteristic of this series: White, Red with black side stripes, light blue with white side stripes or orange with the best known black sidebands. It also highlighted the logo "RS" in the rear of the car and a new grille with 2 headlights instead of 4.

In 1974, Chevrolet Argentina ended production of the "400" with 93,000 units manufactured until then. It was replaced by the Argentine "Chevy Malibu" (based on the 1968–72 American Chevrolet Nova 4-door sedan, with no relation to the North American market Chevrolet Malibu) based on the Chevelle series. However, the same year, the engine "194" would be used for what would be the first General Motors' mid-size car in Argentina, the Opel K-180.

== Engines ==
3 different sizes of Chevrolet Straight-6 engines were offered.

'Chevrolet 400 STD'

- Motor "194" - 194 inches. cub. 3185 cc - 106 hp.

'Chevrolet 400 Special'

- Motor "194" - 194 inches. cub. 3185 cc - 106 hp.
- Motor "230" - 230 inches. cub. 3769 cc - 127 hp.

'Chevrolet 400 Super'

- Motor "230" - 230 inches. cub. 3769 cc - 127 hp.

'Chevrolet 400 Super Sport'

- Motor "250" - 250 inches. cub. 4097 cc - 155 hp.

'Rally Sport Chevrolet 400'

- Motor "194" - 194 inches. cub. 3185 cc - 106 hp.
- Motor "230" - 230 inches. cub. 3769 cc - 127 hp.
- Motor "250" - 250 inches. cub. 4097 cc - 155 hp.

== Sports ==
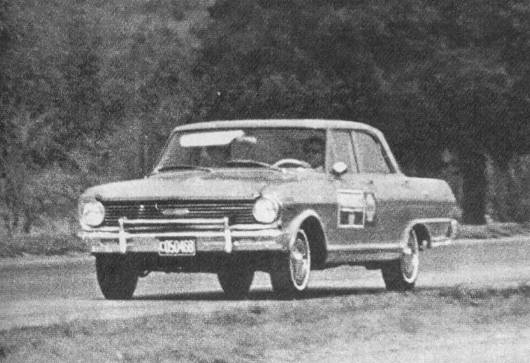
Racing Chevrolet 400 accelerating in the Autódromo de Buenos Aires

The Chevrolet 400 made its debut in the TC in the 1960s, at the same time they began to appear as the first national compact in motorsport. The prototype Chevitú coupé driven by the famous pilot Froilán González (derived from the US Chevrolet Chevy II Nova coupé), was the pioneer in this activity receiving praise and denials alike. The '400' was piloted at TC for several pamphlets, among which stood out Jorge Cupeiro, Carlos Marincovich, Jorge Martínez Boero and Charles Giay, among others.

=== Chevrolet Prototype ===
The "Chevrolet Prototype", were a litter of vehicles submitted by various coaches that their machines with motorized Chevrolet engines.
