= 2019 Trans-Am Series =

American sports car racing competition

The 2019 Trans-Am Series season was the 51st running of the Sports Car Club of America's Trans Am Series. It began on March 1 and ran for twelve rounds.

== Schedule ==
=== National Championship ===
Round	Event	Circuit	Location	Date	Classes	Co headlining or supporting
1	Sebring Vintage Classic	(United States) Sebring International Raceway	Sebring, Florida	March 1–3	All	SVRA
2	Road Atlanta Grand Prix	(United States) Michelin Raceway Road Atlanta	Braselton, Georgia	March 29–31	All	SVRA
3	Trans-Am Speed Fest	(United States) WeatherTech Raceway Laguna Seca	Monterey, California	May 3–5	All	Intercontinental GT Challenge
4	Memorial Day Motorsports Festival	(United States) Lime Rock Park	Lakeville, Connecticut	May 24–27	All	SVRA
5	Detroit Grand Prix	(United States) Streets of Belle Isle	Detroit, Michigan	May 31–June 2	TA2	IndyCar
6	Brickyard Vintage Racing Invitational	(United States) Indianapolis Motor Speedway road course	Speedway, Indiana	August 1–4	All	SVRA
7	Mid-Ohio 100	(United States) Mid-Ohio Sports Car Course	Lexington, Ohio	August 8–10	All	NASCAR Xfinity Series
8	Road America Classic	(United States) Road America	Elkhart Lake, Wisconsin	August 22–24	All	NASCAR Xfinity Series
9	U.S. Vintage Grand Prix	(United States) Watkins Glen International	Watkins Glen, New York	September 5–7	All	SVRA
10	Heacock Classic Gold Cup	(United States) Virginia International Raceway	Alton, Virginia	September 20–22	All	SVRA
11	U.S. Vintage National Championship	(United States) Circuit of the Americas	Elroy, Texas	October 4–6	All	SVRA
12	Classic 24 Hours of Daytona	(United States) Daytona International Speedway road course	Daytona Beach, Florida	November 14–16	All	Historic Sportscar Racing

Races are part of the Northern Cup
Races are part of the Southern Cup
Race is part of both the Northern Cup and the Southern Cup

=== West Coast Championship ===
Round	Event	Circuit	Location	Date	Classes	Co headlining or supporting
1		(United States) Thunderhill Raceway Park	Willows, California	April 12–14	All	NASA
2		(United States) Auto Club Speedway sports car course	Fontana, California	April 26–28	All	SVRA
3	Trans-Am Speed Fest	(United States) WeatherTech Raceway Laguna Seca	Monterey, California	May 3–5	All	SVRA
4		(United States) Sonoma Raceway	Sonoma, California	June 14–16	All	NASA
5		(United States) Portland International Raceway	Portland, Oregon	July 26–28	All	SVRA
6	U.S. Vintage National Championship	(United States) Circuit of the Americas	Elroy, Texas	October 4–6	All	SVRA

Race is combined with Trans-Am National Series.

=== Changes ===
- Homestead Miami Speedway and Pittsburgh International Race Complex were dropped.
- Laguna Seca and Lime Rock were new to the schedule.

== Race results ==
=== National Championship ===
TA, SGT, GT competed together at all events. TA2 competed in a dedicated race at all events. Overall winners in bold.

Round	Circuit	TA Winning driver	TA2 Winning driver	SGT Winning driver	GT Winning driver
1	Sebring International Raceway	(United States) **Lawrence Loshak**	(Brazil) **Rafa Matos**	(United States) Lee Saunders	(United States) Jeff Courtney
2	Road Atlanta	(United States) **Lawrence Loshak**	(Brazil) **Rafa Matos**	(United States) Brian Kleeman	None entered
3	Laguna Seca	(United States) **Ernie Francis Jr.** (Note: The National and West Coast series raced together at Laguna Seca but scored points separately. Francis won overall.)	(United States) **Thomas Merrill** (Note: The TA2 National and West Coast series raced together at Laguna Seca but scored points separately. Merrill won overall.)	(United States) Dirk Leuenberger (Note: The National and West Coast series raced together at Laguna Seca but scored points separately. Leuenberger was 1st of the SGT entrants.)	None entered
4	Lime Rock Park	(United States) **Chris Dyson**	(United States) **Thomas Merrill**	(United States) Mark Boden	(United States) Steven Davison
5	Streets of Belle Isle	TA2 only	R1: (Canada) **Misha Goikhberg**; R2: (United States) **Tony Ave**	TA2 only	TA2 only
6	Indianapolis Motor Speedway road course	(United States) **Chris Dyson**	(United States) **Marc Miller**	(United States) Tim Kezman	(United States) Steven Davison
7	Mid-Ohio Sports Car Course	(United States) **Ernie Francis Jr.**	(United States) **Marc Miller**	(United States) Mark Boden	(United States) Larry Funk
8	Road America	(United States) **Ernie Francis Jr.**	(Brazil) **Rafa Matos**	(United States) Tim Kezman	(United States) Jeff Courtney
9	Watkins Glen International	(United States) **Ernie Francis Jr.**	(Brazil) **Rafa Matos**	(United States) Aaron Pierce	(United States) Steven Davison
10	Virginia International Raceway	(United States) **Boris Said**	(United States) **Marc Miller**	(United States) Tim Kezman	(United States) Steven Davison
11	Circuit of the Americas	(United States) **Adam Andretti** (Note: The National and West Coast series raced together at COTA but scored points separately. Andretti won overall.)	(United States) **Marc Miller** (Note: The TA2 National and West Coast series raced together at COTA but scored points separately. Miller won overall.)	(United States) Ken Thwaits (Note: The National and West Coast series raced together at Laguna Seca but scored points separately. Thwaits finished 1st of the SGT entrants.)	None entered
12	Daytona International Speedway road course	(United States) **Chris Dyson**	(United States) **Thomas Merrill**	(United States) Lee Saunders	(United States) Steven Davison

=== West Coast Championship ===
All classes raced together on track, except in the meetings shared with the National Championship. Bold indicates overall winner.

Round	Circuit	TA Winning driver	TA2 Winning driver	SGT Winning driver	GT Winning driver
1	Thunderhill Raceway Park	(United States) **Greg Pickett**	(United States) Brad McAllister	None entered	(United States) Roger Eagleton
2	Auto Club Speedway sports car course	(United States) Simon Gregg	(United States) **Nick Rosseno**	None entered	None entered
3	Laguna Seca	(United States) Simon Gregg (Note: The National and West Coast series raced together at COTA but scored points separately. Gregg finished 4th overall, 4th of the TA entries and 1st of the West Coast TA entries.)	(United States) Brad McAllister (Note: The National and West Coast series raced together at COTA but scored points separately. McAllister's overall finishing position is unknown, but he was 1st of the West Coast TA2 entries.)	None entered	(United States) Mitch Marvosh (Note: The National and West Coast series raced together at COTA but scored points separately. Marvosh's overall finishing position is unknown, but he was 1st of the West Coast GT entries.)
4	Sonoma Raceway	(United States) Simon Gregg	(United States) **Derek Kraus**	(Sweden) Carl Rydquist	(United States) Clark Nunes
5	Portland International Raceway	(United States) **Greg Pickett**	(United States) Brad McAllister	None entered	(United States) Beau Borders
6	Circuit of the Americas	(United States) Michelle Nagai (Note: The National and West Coast series raced together at COTA but scored points separately. Nagai finished 6th overall, 6th in TA and 1st of the West Coast TA entrants.)	(United States) Brad McAllister (Note: The TA2 National and West Coast series raced together at COTA but scored points separately. McAllister finished 8th overall and 1st of the West Coast entrants.)	(Sweden) Carl Rydquist (Note: The National and West Coast series raced together at COTA but scored points separately. Rydquist finished 11th overall, 4th of the SGT entries and was the only SGT West Coast entrant.)	(United States) Joe Bogetich (Note: The National and West Coast series raced together at COTA but scored points separately. Bogetich finished 14th overall, 1st in GT and 1st of the GT West Coast entrants.)
