= Daytona International Speedway =

Motorsport track in the United States

- Tri-Oval (1959–present)

- Sports Car Course (1985–present)
- Location: 1801 West International Speedway Blvd, Daytona Beach, Florida, United States 32114
- Coordinates: 29°11′8″N 81°4′10″W
- Capacity: 101,500–167,785 (w/ infield, depending on configuration) 123,500 (grandstand capacity)
- Owner: NASCAR (2019–present); International Speedway Corporation (1959–2019)
- Operator: NASCAR (1959–present)
- Broke ground: November 25, 1957; 68 years ago
- Opened: February 22, 1959; 67 years ago
- Construction cost: US$3 million
- Architect: Charles Moneypenny; Bill France Sr.
- Major events: Current: NASCAR Cup Series Daytona 500 (1959–present) Coke Zero Sugar 400 (1959–present) The Duel at Daytona (1959–present) The Clash (1979–2021, 2027) O'Reilly Auto Parts 253 (2020–2021); IMSA WeatherTech SportsCar Championship Rolex 24 at Daytona (1962–present) WeatherTech 240 (1967–1986, 2000, 2002–2009, 2020); NASCAR O'Reilly Auto Parts Series United Rentals 300 (1982–present) Winn-Dixie 250 (2002–present) Super Start Batteries 188 (2020–2021); NASCAR Truck Series Fresh From Florida 250 (2000–present) BrakeBest Select 159 (2020–2021); ARCA Menards Series General Tire 200 (1964–present) General Tire 100 (2020); Daytona 200 (1961–2019, 2021–present); AMA Supercross Championship Daytona Supercross by Honda (1974–present); Welcome to Rockville (2021–present); Former: Trans-Am Series (1967–1968, 1984, 2013–2019); Grand-Am Daytona Finale (1972–1986, 1996, 2001–2003); Grand Prix motorcycle racing United States motorcycle Grand Prix (1961–1965); IROC (1974–1978, 1985–1989, 1991–2006); USAC Daytona 100 (1959)
- Website: http://www.daytonainternationalspeedway.com/

NASCAR Tri-Oval (1959–present)
- Surface: Asphalt
- Length: 2.500 mi (4.023 km)
- Turns: 4
- Banking: Turns: 31° Tri-oval: 18° Back straightaway: 3°
- Race lap record: 0:43.682 ( (United States) Erik Jones, Toyota Camry, 2020, NASCAR Cup)

Sports Car Course (1985–present)
- Surface: Asphalt
- Length: 3.560 mi (5.729 km)
- Turns: 12
- Banking: Oval turns: 31° Tri-Oval: 18° Back straightaway: 3° Infield: 0° (flat)
- Race lap record: 1:33.724 ( (Spain) Alex Palou, Cadillac DPi-V.R, 2022, DPi)

Long Motorcycle Course (2005–present)
- Surface: Asphalt
- Length: 3.510 mi (5.649 km)
- Turns: 12
- Banking: Oval turns: 31° Tri-Oval: 18° Back straightaway: 3° Infield: 0° (flat)
- Race lap record: 1:47.879 ( (United States) Josh Herrin, Ducati Panigale V2, 2025, SSP)

Short Motorcycle Course (2008–present)
- Surface: Asphalt
- Length: 2.900 mi (4.667 km)
- Turns: 12
- Banking: Oval turns: 31° Tri-Oval: 18° Back straightaway: 3° Infield: 0° (flat)
- Race lap record: 1:36.266 ( (Australia) Mat Mladin, Suzuki GSX-R1000, 2008, SBK)

NASCAR Road Course (2020–2021)
- Surface: Asphalt
- Length: 3.570 mi (5.745 km)
- Turns: 14
- Banking: Oval turns: 31° Tri-Oval: 18° Back straightaway: 3° Infield: 0° (flat)
- Race lap record: 1:55.677 ( (United States) Chase Elliott, Chevrolet Camaro ZL1, 2021, NASCAR Cup)

Sports Car Course (1984)
- Surface: Asphalt
- Length: 3.870 mi (6.228 km)
- Race lap record: 1:45.209 ( (United Kingdom) Derek Bell, Porsche 962, 1984, IMSA GTP)

Sports Car Course (1975–1983)
- Surface: Asphalt
- Length: 3.840 mi (6.180 km)
- Race lap record: 1:45.360 ( (United States) Danny Ongais, Lola T600, 1982, IMSA GTP)

Sports Car Course (1959–1974)
- Surface: Asphalt
- Length: 3.810 mi (6.132 km)
- Turns: 7
- Race lap record: 1:41.250 ( (United States) Mark Donohue, Ferrari 512 M, 1971, Group 5)

Dirt Flat Track
- Surface: Dirt
- Length: 0.25 mi (0.40 km)
- Turns: 4

Daytona International Speedway is a race track in Daytona Beach, Florida, United States, about 50 mi (80 km) north of Orlando. Since opening in 1959, it has been the home of the Daytona 500, the most prestigious race in NASCAR as well as its season opening event. The venue also hosts the 24 Hours of Daytona, one of three races that make up the Triple Crown of endurance racing. In addition to NASCAR and IMSA, the track also hosts races of ARCA, AMA Superbike Championship, SCCA, and AMA Supercross Championship. The track features multiple layouts including the primary 2.500 mi (4.023 km) high-speed tri-oval, a 3.560 mi (5.729 km) sports car course, a 3.510 mi (5.649 km)motorcycle course, and a 1,320 ft (400 m) karting and motorcycle flat-track. The track's 180 acres (73 ha) infield includes the 29 acres (12 ha) Lake Lloyd, which has hosted powerboat racing.

The track was built in 1959 by NASCAR founder Bill France Sr. to host racing that was held at the former Daytona Beach Road Course. His banked design permitted higher speeds and gave fans a better view of the cars. The speedway is operated by NASCAR pursuant to a lease with the City of Daytona Beach on the property that runs until 2054. The venue describes itself as the "World Center of Racing".

Lights were installed around the track in 1998, and today it is the third-largest single-lit outdoor sports facility. The speedway has been renovated four times, with the infield renovated in 2004 and the track repaved in 1978 and 2010. On January 22, 2013, the fourth speedway renovation was unveiled. On July 5, 2013, ground was broken on "Daytona Rising" to remove backstretch seating and completely redevelop the frontstretch seating. The renovation was by design-builder Barton Malow Company in partnership with Rossetti Architects. The project was completed in January 2016, and cost US $400 million. It emphasized improved fan experience with five expanded and redesigned fan entrances (called "injectors"), as well as wider and more comfortable seats, and more restrooms and concession stands. After the renovations were complete, the track's grandstands had 101,500 permanent seats with the ability to increase permanent seating to 125,000. The project was finished before the start of Speedweeks in 2016.

== Track history ==
=== Construction ===
NASCAR founder Bill France Sr. began planning for the track in 1953 as a way to promote the series, which at the time was racing on the Daytona Beach Road Course. France met with Daytona Beach engineer Charles Moneypenny to discuss his plans for the speedway. He wanted the track to have the highest banking possible to allow the cars to reach high speeds and to give fans a better view of the cars on track. Moneypenny traveled to Detroit, Michigan to visit the Ford Proving Grounds which had a high-speed test track with banked corners. Ford shared their engineering design of the track with Moneypenny, providing the needed details of how to transition the pavement from a flat straightaway to a banked corner. France took the plans to the Daytona Beach city commission, who supported his idea and formed the Daytona Beach Speedway Authority.

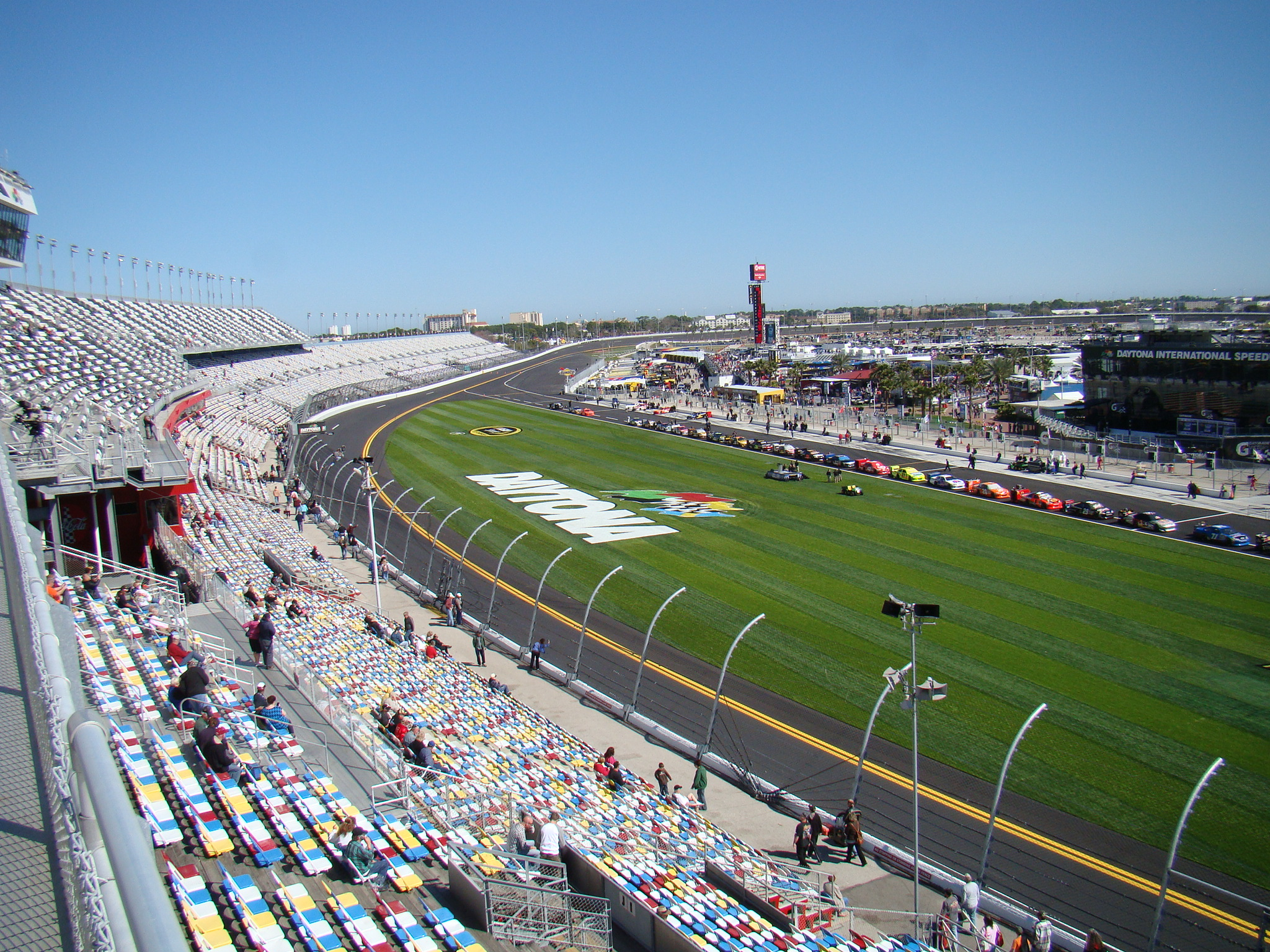
The tri-oval after the 2010–2011 repaving

The city commission agreed to lease the 447-acre (180.9 ha) parcel of land adjacent to Daytona Beach Municipal Airport to France's corporation for $10,000 a year over a 50-year period. France then began working on building funding for the project and found support from a Texas oil millionaire, Clint Murchison, Sr. Murchison lent France $600,000 along with the construction equipment necessary to build the track. France also secured funding from Pepsi-Cola, General Motors designer Harley Earl, a second mortgage on his home and selling 300,000 stock shares to local residents. Ground broke on construction of the 2.500 mi (4.023 km) speedway on November 25, 1957.

To build the high banking, crews had to excavate over a million square yards of soil from the track's infield. Because of the high water table in the area, the excavated hole filled with water to form what is now known as Lake Lloyd, named after Joseph "Sax" Lloyd, one of the original six members of the Daytona Beach Speedway Authority. (The lake was stocked with 65,000 fish, and France arranged speedboat races on it.) 22 tons of lime mortar had to be brought in to form the track's binding base, over which asphalt was laid. Because of the extreme degree of banking, Moneypenny had to come up with a way to pave the incline. He connected the paving equipment to bulldozers anchored at the top of the banking. This allowed the paving equipment to pave the banking without slipping or rolling down the incline. Moneypenny subsequently patented his construction method and later designed Talladega Superspeedway and Michigan International Speedway. By December 1958, France had begun to run out of money and relied on race ticket sales to complete construction. He also received a substantial sum of money from the Pepsi company after attempting to obtain the money to finish construction from the Coca-Cola Company and being turned down. For years from when the track opened to France's death, France never allowed Coca-Cola to be sold as a concession at any of the tracks he owned as a result.

The tri-oval during the 2015 Daytona 500 with nearly completed grandstand in the background.

The first practice run on the new track was on February 6, 1959. On February 22, 1959, 42,000 people attended the inaugural Daytona 500. Its finish was as startling as the track itself: Lee Petty beat Johnny Beauchamp in a photo finish that took three days to adjudicate. When the track opened it was the fastest race track to host a stock car race, until Talladega Superspeedway opened 10 years later. On April 4, it hosted a 100 mi (160.9 km) Champ Car event which saw Jim Rathmann beat Dick Rathmann and Rodger Ward, at an average speed of 170.26 mph (274.01 km/h), at the time the fastest motor race ever. It was the occasion of Daytona's first fatality: George Amick, attempting to overtake for third late in the race, hit a wall and was killed. April 5, a scheduled 1,000 km (620 mi) sports car event (shortened to 560 mi (900 km) by darkness) was won by Roberto Mieres and Fritz d'Orey, who shared a Porsche RSK, which proved more durable than more potent competition.

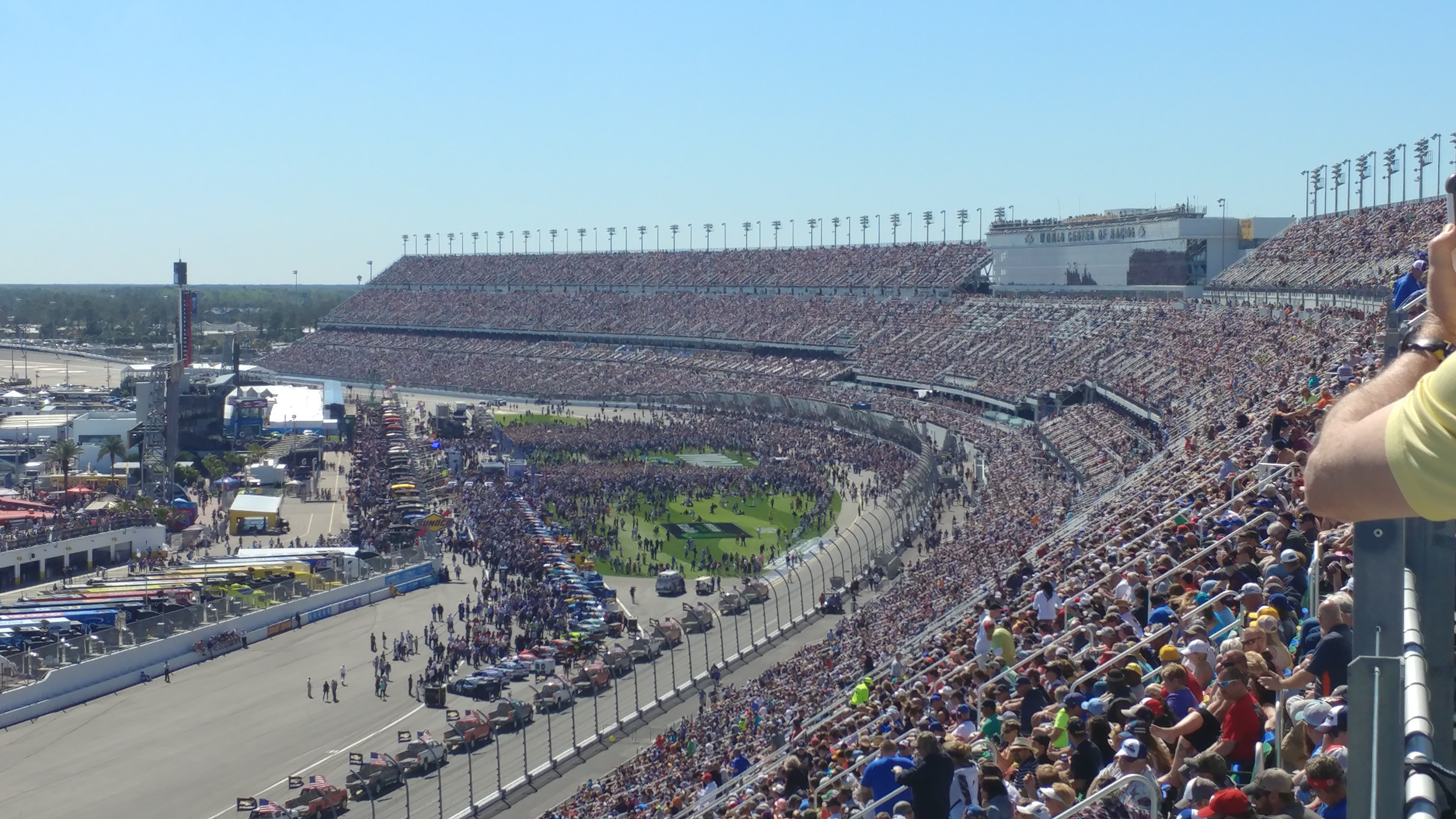
The tri-oval in 2017 after Daytona Rising was completed.

Lights were installed around the track in 1998 to run NASCAR's July race, the Coke Zero 400 at night. The track was the world's largest single lighted outdoor sports facility until being surpassed by Losail International Circuit in 2008. Musco Lighting installed the lighting system, which took into account glare and visibility for aircraft arriving and departing nearby Daytona Beach International Airport, and costs about $240 per hour when in operation.

=== Layouts ===
==== Tri-oval ====
Map of the speedway

Daytona's tri-oval is 2.500 mi (4.023 km) long with 31° banking in the turns and 18° banking at the start/finish line. The front straight is 3,800 ft (1,200 m) long and the back straight (or "superstretch") is 3,000 ft (910 m) long. The tri-oval shape was revolutionary at the time as it greatly improved sight lines for fans. It is one of the three tracks on the NASCAR Cup Series circuit that are considered "drafting tracks", the others being Talladega Superspeedway and Atlanta Motor Speedway.

On July 15, 2010, repaving of the track began. This came almost a year earlier than planned due to the track coming apart during the 2010 Daytona 500. The project used an estimated 50,000 tons of asphalt to repave 1.4×10^{6} sq ft (130,000 m^{2}) including the racing surface, apron, skid pads and pit road. Because of good weather, the project was completed ahead of schedule.

On October 9, 2013, Colin Braun drove a Daytona Prototype car prepared by Michael Shank Racing to set a single-lap record on the tri-oval configuration of 222.971 mph (358.837 km/h). During NASCAR events, it takes less than a minute for the cars to complete a lap around the 2.500 mi (4.023 km) tri-oval course.

==== Road courses ====
Map of the 24-hour road course configuration

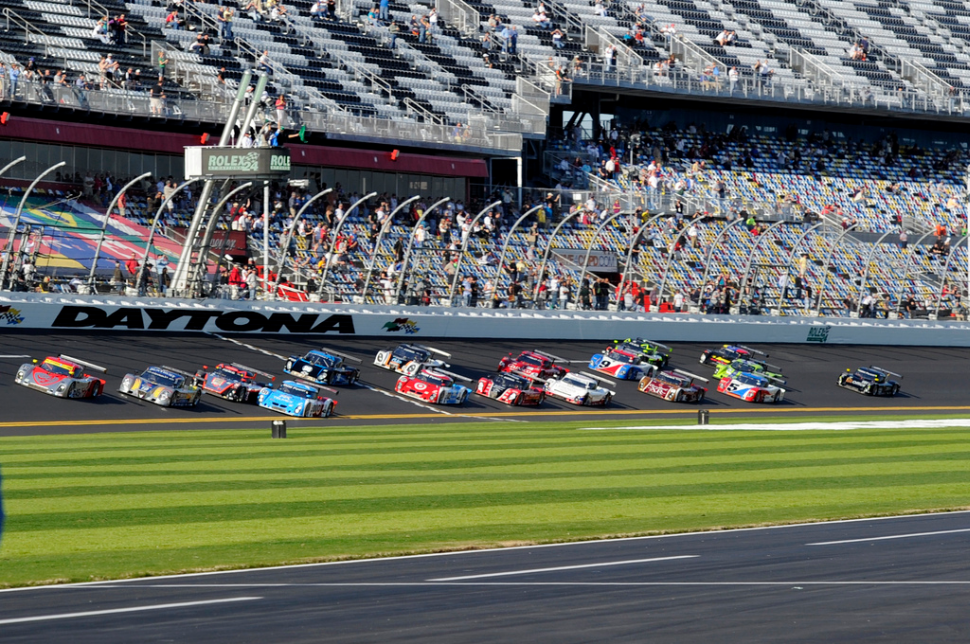
Start of the 2011 Rolex 24 at Daytona

While the more famous 24 Hours of Le Mans is held near the summer solstice, Daytona's endurance race is held in winter (meaning more of the race is run at night). The track's lighting system is limited to 20% of its maximum output for the race to keep cars dependent on their headlights.

The 3.810 mi (6.132 km) road course was built in 1959 and first hosted a three-hour sports car race called the Daytona Continental in 1962. The race length became 2,000 km (1,200 mi) in 1964, and in 1966 was extended to a 24-hour endurance race known as the Rolex 24 at Daytona. It was shortened again to six hours in 1972 and the 1974 rendition of the race was cancelled entirely.

In 1973, a very sharp chicane was added at the end of the backstretch, approaching oval turn three.

In 1984 and 1985, the layout was modified, re-profiling road course turns 1 and 2, and moving what is now turn 3 (nicknamed the "International Horseshoe") closer to its preceding turns. Also, the chicane on the backstretch was modified. A new entry leg was constructed approximately 400 ft (120 m) earlier, resulting in a longer, three-legged, "bus stop" shape. Cars would now enter in the first leg, bypass the second leg, and exit out of the existing third leg. Passing would now be possible inside the longer chicane. The construction resulted in a final length of 3.560 mi (5.729 km) for the complete road course.

In 2003, the backstretch chicane was modified once again. The middle leg was repaved and widened, and now cars would enter through the first leg, and exit out of the second leg. The existing third leg was abandoned. This allowed cars a cleaner entry into oval turn three. After favorable results, in 2010 the third leg was demolished and removed permanently.

In 2005, a second infield road course configuration was constructed, primarily for motorcycles. Due to fears of tire wear on the banked oval sections, oval turns 1 and 2 were bypassed giving the new course a length of 2.950 mi (4.748 km). The Daytona SportBike that runs the Daytona 200 however, uses the main road course except for the motorcycle Pedro Rodríguez Hairpin (tighter than the one used for cars; the car version is used as an acceleration lane for motorcycles).

On September 26 and 27, 2006, the IndyCar Series held a compatibility test on the 10-turn, 2.730 mi (4.394 km) modified road course, and the 12-turn 2.950 mi (4.748 km) motorcycle road course with 5 drivers. The drivers who tested at the track were Vítor Meira, Sam Hornish Jr., Tony Kanaan, Scott Dixon and Dan Wheldon. This marked the first time since 1984 that open wheel cars have taken to the track at Daytona. On January 31 – February 1, 2007, IndyCar returned for a full test involving 17 cars.

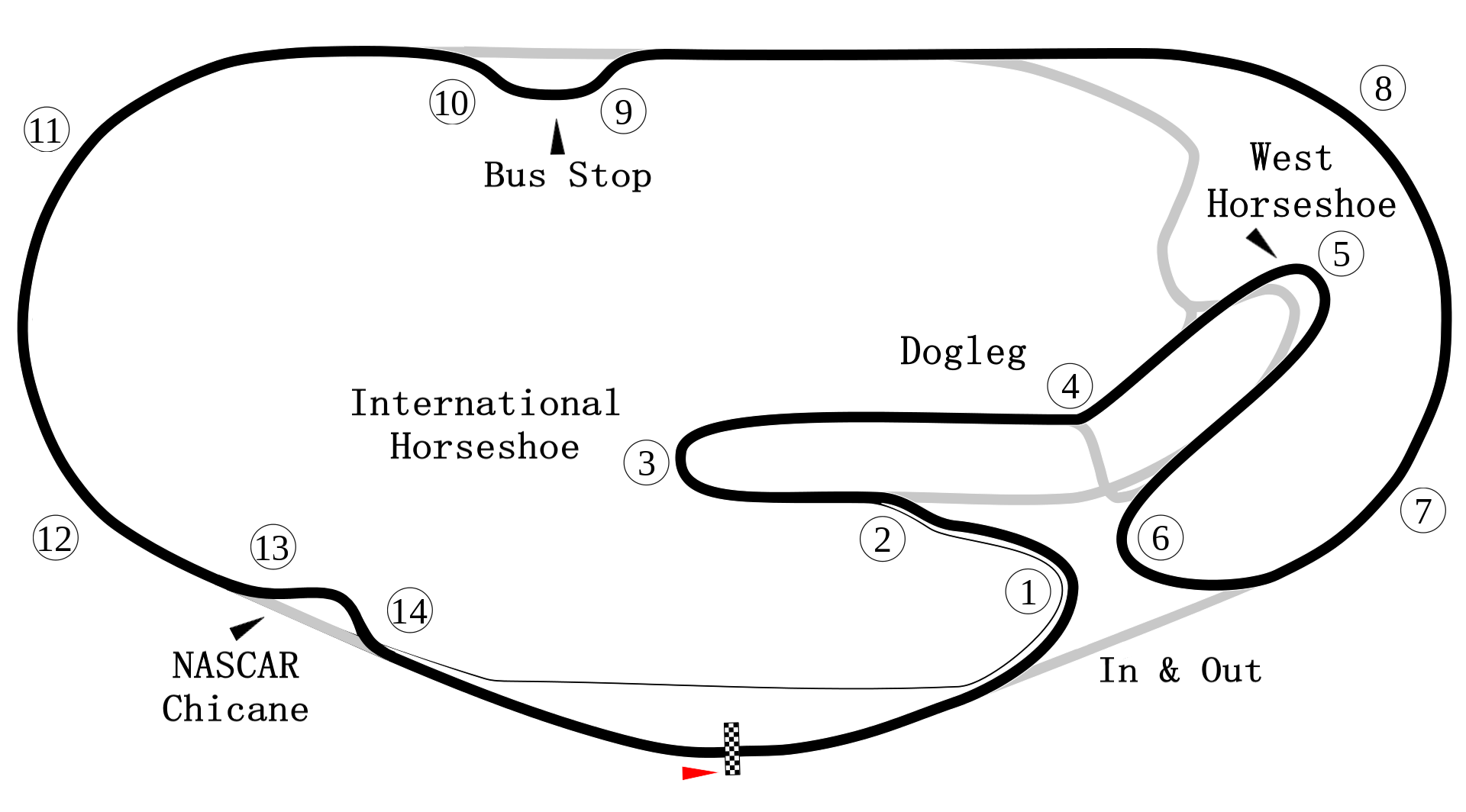
Map of NASCAR road course.

On July 8, 2020, NASCAR announced that it would race the Daytona road course in all of its national series for the first time in mid-August, due to current COVID-19 pandemic health restrictions in New York state (requiring 14 days self-isolation on arrival from other states) preventing the use of Watkins Glen International. On July 30, a modification of the course to add a chicane near the exit of Turn 12 (Oval Turn Four) was announced, lengthening the course to 3.570 mi (5.745 km).

On January 21, 2024, Pipo Derani set the fastest ever recorded lap of the modern Daytona road course, with a 1:32.656 driving a Cadillac V-Series.R during qualifying for the 2024 24 Hours of Daytona. During the same session, every entrant in the IMSA GTP class broke the course lap record previously set by Oliver Jarvis in a Mazda RT24-P in 2019.

==== Supercross ====
During Daytona Beach Bike Week, a supercross track is built between the pit road and the tri-oval section of the track. Historically the track has used more sand than dirt, providing unique challenges to riders. The 2008–2013 track configurations were designed by former champion, Ricky Carmichael.

Daytona has hosted an AMA Supercross Championship round uninterruptedly since 1971.

==== Flat track and infield kart track ====
Popular dirt-track races in karting and flat-track motorcycle racing had been held at Daytona Beach Municipal Stadium but in 2009, the city announced the stadium was replacing its entire surface with FieldTurf, and thereby eliminating the flat-track racing at the stadium. To continue racing, speedway officials built the Daytona Flat Track, a new quarter-mile dirt track outside of turns 1 & 2 of the main superspeedway. It seats 5,000 in temporary grandstands and opened in December 2009 for WKA KartWeek. From 2010 to 2016, it also hosted the AMA Grand National Championship, before it was moved in 2017 to the tri-oval section and became a TT course.

There is also a short paved kart/autocross track in the infield just inside of turn three. The SCCA holds autocross on this track in addition to hosting sprint karting races during KartWeek.

==== Paved short track ====
In February 2012, it was announced that a 0.400 mi (0.644 km) paved short track would be constructed along the backstretch of the Speedway's main course, for NASCAR's lower series to compete at during Speedweeks called the UNOH Battle at the Beach, which is similar to the Toyota All-Star Showdown, formerly held at Irwindale Speedway. The first races were held on that track in February 2013. The track was shortened to a 0.375 mi (0.604 km) oval in 2014 by shorter straightaways. The future of racing at the short track became uncertain after 2015 with the grandstands on the back straightaway being demolished as a part of the Daytona Rising project.

=== Football ===
In the fall of 1959, the track hosted several high school football games for the Father Lopez Green Wave in the first year of the school's football program.

The track hosted four college football games featuring the Daytona-based Bethune–Cookman Wildcats in 1974 and 1975. In early 2014 track president Joie Chitwood expressed a desire to bring football back to the track.

=== Soccer ===
On July 2 and 3, 2022, the track hosted Daytona Soccer Fest, a two-day event highlighted by a friendly match between heated Colombian rivals América de Cali and Deportivo Cali and a NWSL regular season match between the Orlando Pride and Racing Louisville FC.

== Video games ==
In 1994, Sega released an arcade game called Daytona USA, using their Model 2 Arcade hardware. It was developed by their famed "AM2" development team. It featured a fully detailed 3D model based on the circuit for the very first time. The soundtrack for the game included vocals by Takenobu Mitsuyoshi. It is widely considered to be one of the most successful and influential racing games of all time. Daytona USA spawned many sequels, both in the arcades and on various home video game consoles. The latest version, Daytona Championship USA, was released to arcades in 2017.

iRacing.com have laser-scanned the facility twice. The first in 2008, and 2011 once the repave was completed. Both are available in official racing series. There has been no word to when and if it will be re-scanned now that the Daytona Rising project has now been completed.

Both the oval layout and Rolex 24 Hour layout are available in both PlayStation 3 video games Gran Turismo 5 and Gran Turismo 6, and in the PlayStation 4 and PlayStation 5 game Gran Turismo 7. Daytona International Speedway is also featured in Forza Motorsport 6 and Forza Motorsport 7 for the Xbox One and Windows 10. The circuit returned to the Forza series as part of the 2023 Forza Motorsport for Xbox Series X/S and Windows.

Real Racing 3's second NASCAR update featured the Daytona International Speedway as a new circuit coming in three layouts. In addition to the oval and Rolex 24 Hour layouts in Gran Turismo, there also exists a Daytona 200 layout in the game.

== Fatalities ==
Forty-one people have been fatally injured in on-track incidents: 24 car drivers, twelve motorcyclists, three go-kart drivers, one powerboat racer, and one track worker. The most notorious death was that of Dale Earnhardt, who was killed on the final lap of the 2001 Daytona 500 on February 18, 2001. Earnhardt is still Daytona International Speedway's most successful driver, with a total of 34 career victories (12 Daytona 500 qualifying races, 7 NASCAR Xfinity Series races, six Clash races, six IROC races, two Pepsi 400 July Races and the 1998 Daytona 500).

== Fan amenities ==
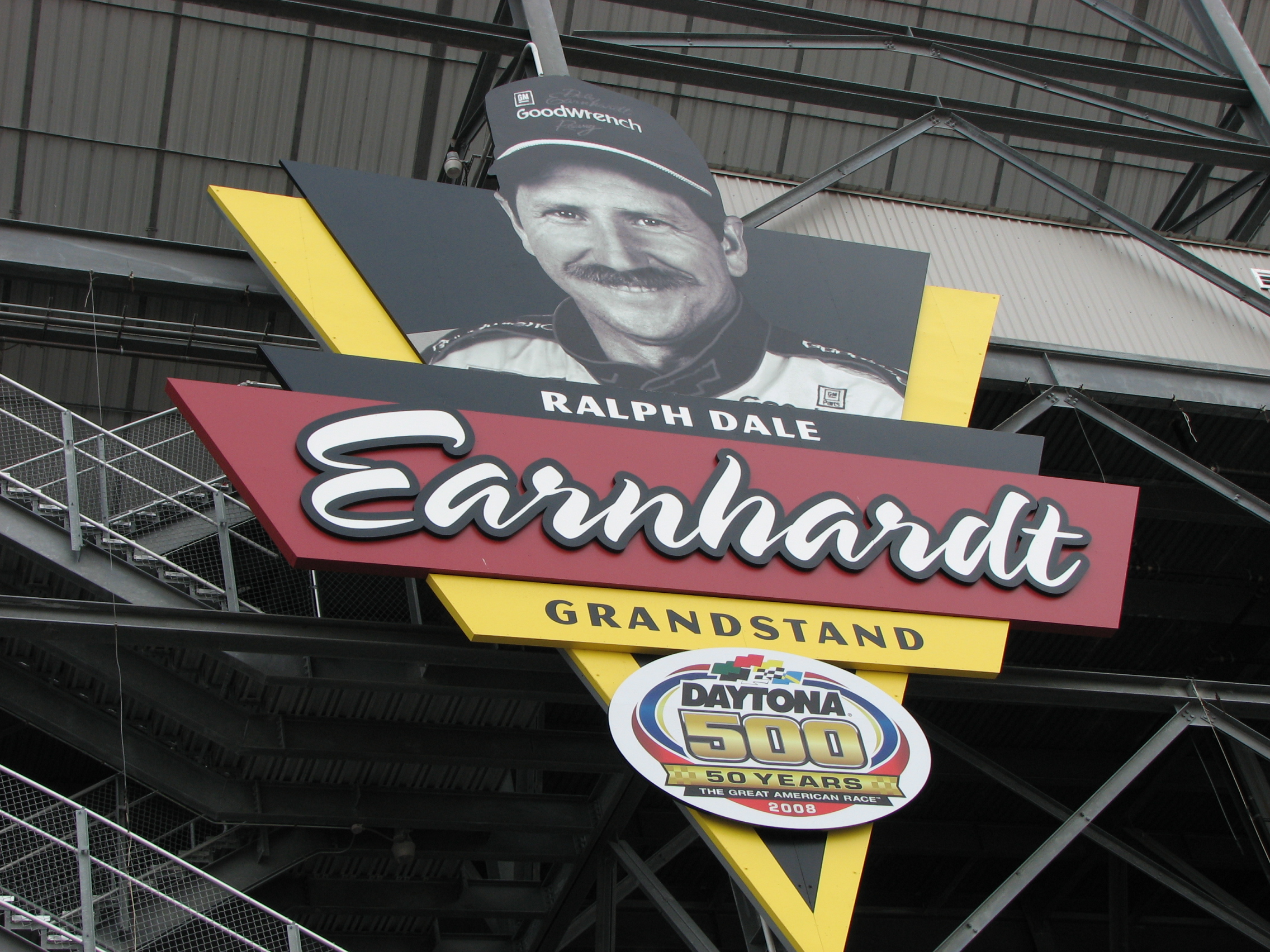
The former Earnhardt Grandstand at Daytona International Speedway, which was changed into one of the injectors after Daytona Rising

=== Hard Rock Bet Fanzone ===
The Hard Rock Bet Fanzone is an access package similar to pit passes for fans to get closer to drivers and race teams. The fanzone was built in 2004 as part of a renovation of the track's infield. Fans are able to walk on top of the garages, known as the "fandeck", and view track and garage activity. Fans can also view race teams working in the garage, including NASCAR technical inspection, through windows. The garage windows also include slots for fans to hand merchandise to drivers for autographs. The fanzone also includes a live entertainment stage, additional food and drink areas and various other activities and displays.

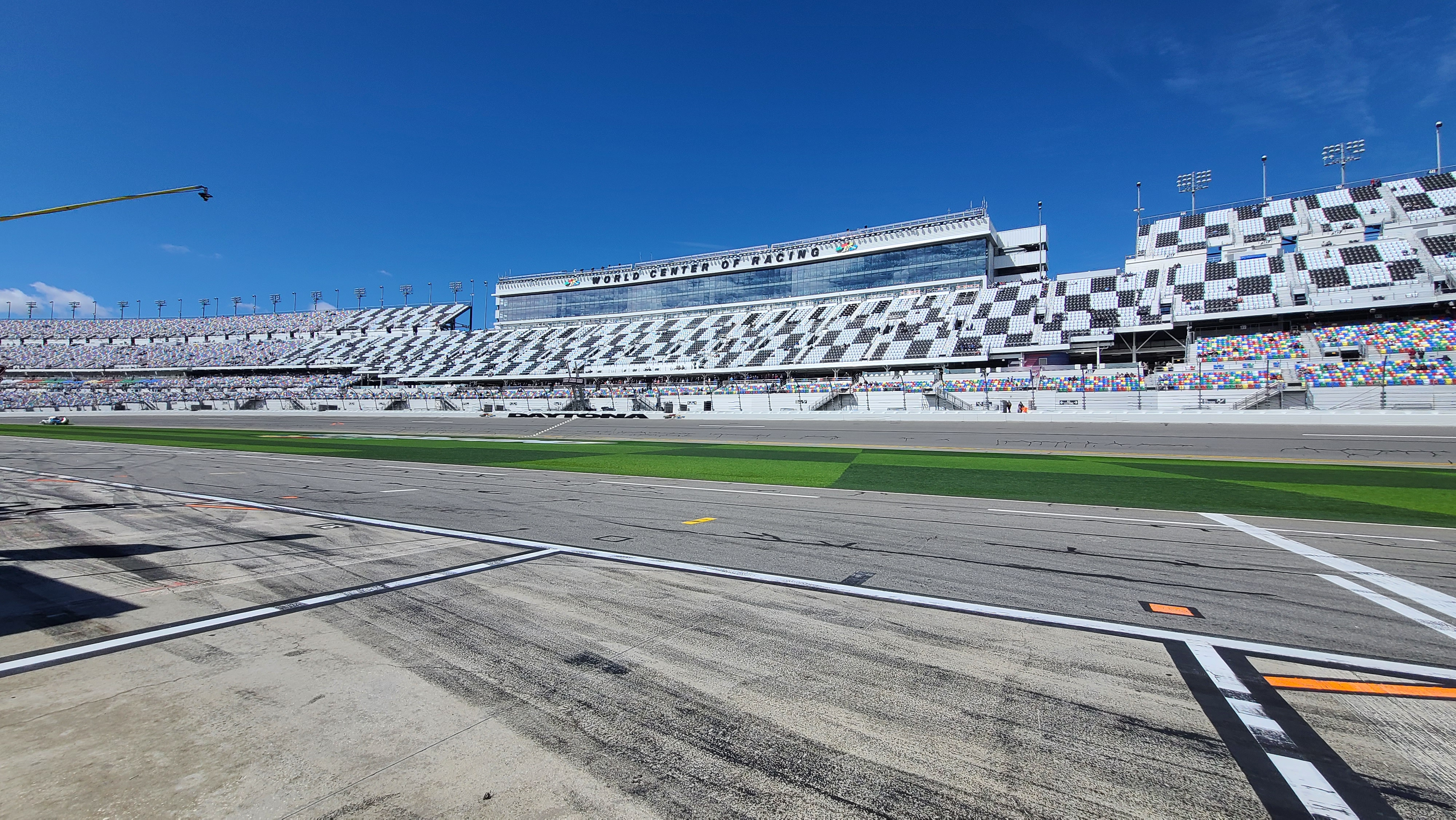
Daytona International Speedway Grandstand and Hospitality building from Pit Road. The Hospitality Building hosts the Rolex 24 Lounge, Sky Suite and France Suite and the Tri-Oval Club.

The 2004 renovation of the infield, headed by design firm HNTB, was the first major renovation of the infield in the history of the track. In addition to the fanzone, a new vehicle and pedestrian tunnel was built under turn 1. The tunnel posed a challenge to engineers because it was to be built under the water table. Another challenge came during construction when three named hurricanes passed by the track, flooding much of the excavation work. The infield renovation involved landscaping and hardscaping, such as a new walkway along the shore of Lake Lloyd, and the construction of 34 new buildings, including garages and fueling stations, offices and inspection facilities, and a club. The renovation project received a 2005 Award for Excellence from Design-Build Institute of America. Following the success of the UNOH Fanzone at Daytona, Las Vegas Motor Speedway and Kansas Speedway each built a similar infield fanzone. On December 9, 2016, the speedway announced that the University of Northwestern Ohio purchased entitlement rights to the fanzone, and that the area will be named 'UNOH Fanzone'. On January 25, 2024, it announced the naming rights had been purchased by Hard Rock Cafe and named 'Hard Rock Bet Fanzone' after their sports betting service.

=== Budweiser Party Porch ===
The Budweiser Party Porch was a 46 ft-high (14.0 m) porch located along the backstretch of the track. It was built on top of a portion of the backstretch grandstands and includes a 277 ft-wide (84.4 m), 33 ft-tall (10.1 m) sign, the largest sign in motorsports. The porch featured tables, food and drinks, offering fans a "fun-filled" atmosphere that breaks fans away from the confines of grandstand seating without sacrificing the view. Below the porch was an interactive fan zone featuring amusement rides, a go-kart track, show cars and merchandise trailers. After the 2015 racing season, the Party Porch was torn down with the backstretch grandstands as part of the DAYTONA Rising project.

== Layout configurations ==
Daytona International Speedway layout configurations
Tri-Oval (1959–present)

Sports Car Course (1985–present)

Motorcycle Course (2005–2007)

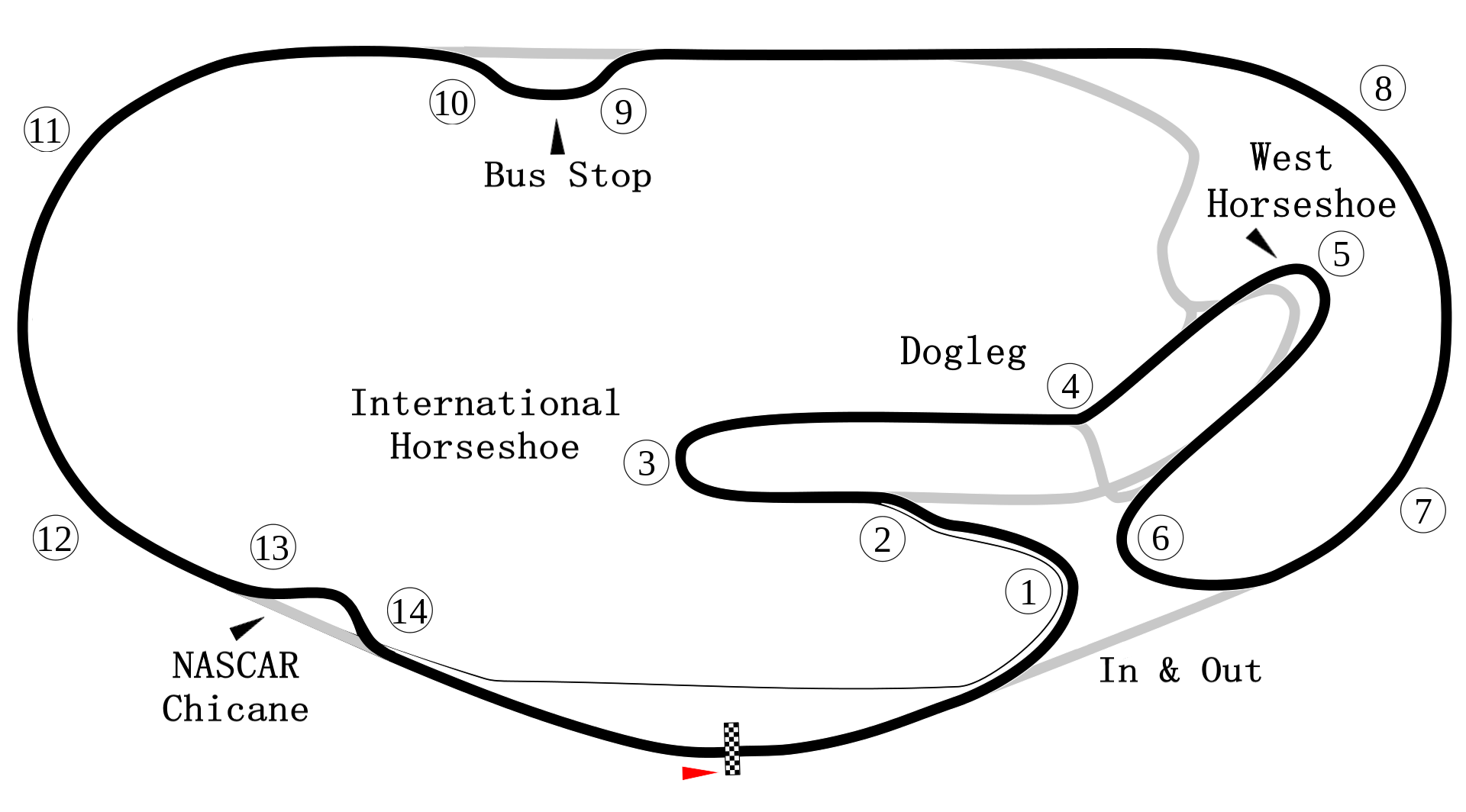
NASCAR Road Course (2020–2021)

== Events ==
=== Current ===
==== 2.5-mile superspeedway ====
The start of the 2015 Daytona 500

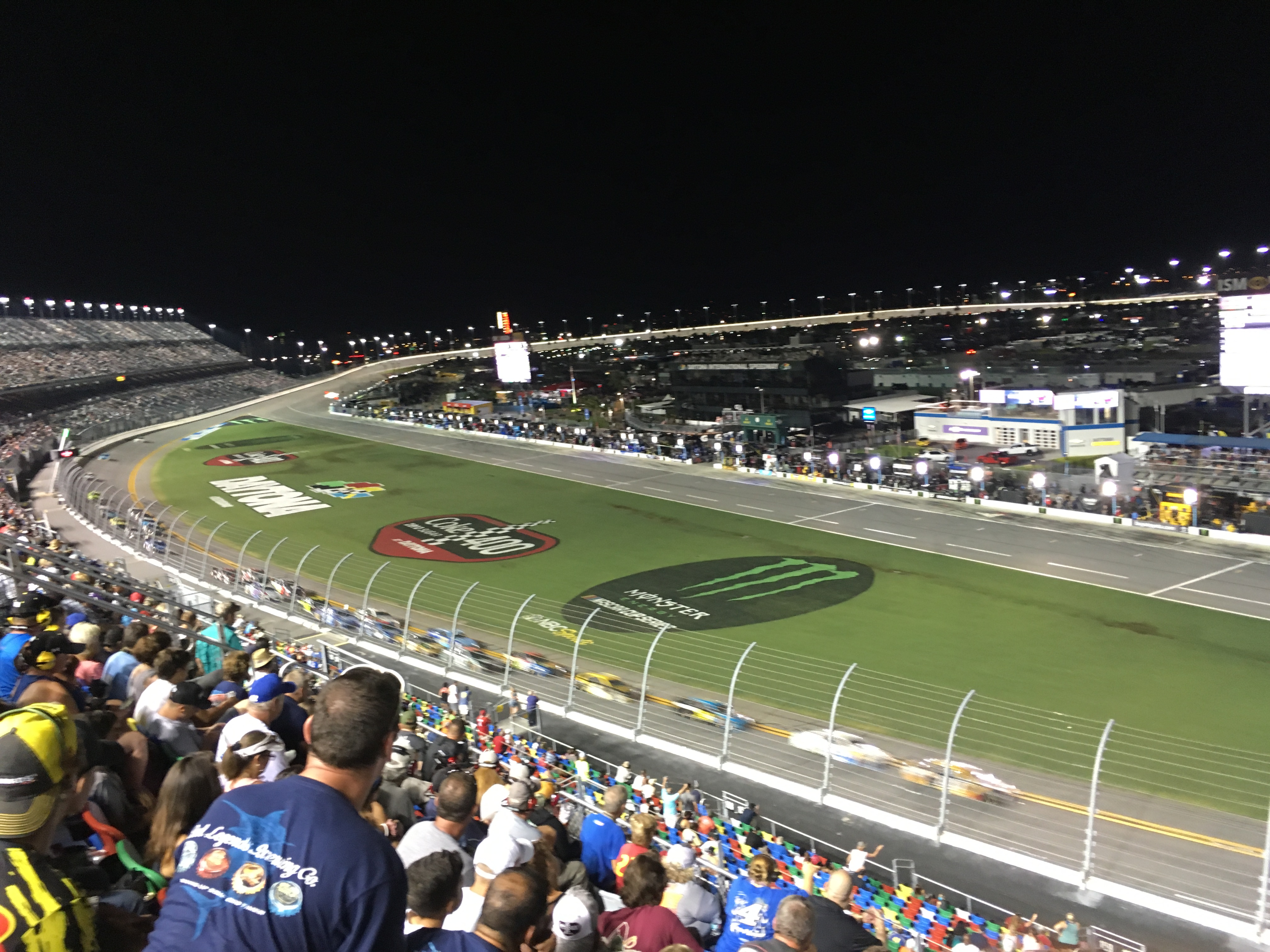
The 2018 Coke Zero Sugar 400

- NASCAR Cup Series
  - Points-paying races: Daytona 500, Coke Zero Sugar 400
  - Non-points-paying races: The Clash
  - Qualifying races: The Duel at Daytona
- NASCAR O'Reilly Auto Parts Series
  - United Rentals 300
  - Winn-Dixie 250
- NASCAR Truck Series
  - Fresh From Florida 250
- ARCA Menards Series
  - General Tire 200

==== Road course ====
- IMSA WeatherTech SportsCar Championship (formerly Grand-American Rolex Sports Car Series)
  - Rolex 24 at Daytona
- Michelin Pilot Challenge
  - BMW M Endurance Challenge
- WKA Vega Road Racing Series driven by Mazda
  - Daytona Kart Week
- ChampCar Endurance Series
  - The 14-Hours of Daytona Beach
- MotoAmerica
  - Daytona 200

==== Other ====
- Monster Energy AMA Supercross
  - Daytona Supercross by Honda
- Ricky Carmichael Amateur Supercross
- AMA Pro Flat Track Racing
  - Daytona Flat Track
- WKA Mazda/Bridgestone Manufacturers Cup Series
  - Daytona Kart Week
- WKA Speedway Dirt
  - Daytona Dirt World Championships
- Daytona Beach Half Marathon
- Welcome to Rockville

=== Former ===
- AMA Pro Daytona Sportbike Championship
  - Daytona 200 (2009–2014)
- ARCA Menards Series
  - General Tire 100 (2020)
- Grand American (1968–1972)
- Grand Prix motorcycle racing
  - United States motorcycle Grand Prix (1961–1965)
- IMSA GT Championship
  - Daytona Finale (1972–1986, 1996)
  - Paul Revere 250 (1973–1983)
  - Rolex 24 at Daytona (1975–1997)
- IMSA WeatherTech SportsCar Championship
  - WeatherTech 240 (2020)
- International Race of Champions (1974–1978, 1985–1989, 1991–2006)
- ISCARS Dash Touring Series
  - IPOWER Dash 150 (1979–2004)
  - DaytonaUSA.com 150 (2001)
- LATAM Challenge Series (2014)
- NASCAR Camping World Truck Series
  - BrakeBest Select 159 (2020–2021)
- NASCAR Convertible Division
  - 100 Mile Qualifying Races (1959)
- NASCAR Cup Series
  - American Challenge Cup (1961–1963)
  - O'Reilly Auto Parts 253 (2020–2021)
- NASCAR K&N Pro Series East (1988–1992, 1995–1997, 2014)
- NASCAR Xfinity Series
  - Super Start Batteries 188 (2020–2021)
- Rolex Sports Car Series
  - Brumos Porsche 250 (2000, 2002–2010)
  - Daytona Finale (2001–2003)
  - Rolex 24 at Daytona (2000–2013)
- SCCA National Championship Runoffs (1965, 1967, 1969, 2015)
- Trans-Am Series
  - Trans-Am Finale (1967–1968, 1984, 2013–2019)
- United States Road Racing Championship
  - Rolex 24 at Daytona (1998–1999)
- USAC Championship Car
  - USAC Daytona 100 (1959)
- World Sportscar Championship
  - 24 Hours of Daytona (1962–1973, 1975, 1977–1981)

== Track records ==
As of August 2026, track records on the 2.500 mi (4.023 km) tri-oval are followed as:

Record	Year	Date	Driver	Car Make	Time	Speed/Avg Speed
NASCAR Cup Series
Qualifying Lap Records
Qualifying (Generation 1)	1966	February 20	David Pearson	Dodge	0:51.315	175.385 mph (282.255 km/h)
Qualifying (Generation 2)	1979	February 10	Buddy Baker	Oldsmobile	0:45.907	196.049 mph (315.510 km/h)
Qualifying (Generation 3)	1987	February 9	Bill Elliott	Ford	0:42.783	210.364 mph (338.548 km/h)
Qualifying (Generation 4)	1995	February 11	Bill Elliott	Ford	0:45.815	196.441 mph (316.141 km/h)
Qualifying (Car of Tomorrow)	2012	February 19	Carl Edwards	Ford	0:46.216	194.738 mph (313.400 km/h)
Qualifying (Generation 6)	2013	February 17	Danica Patrick	Ford	0:45.817	196.434 mph (316.130 km/h)
Qualifying (Next Gen)	2026	August 28	Ross Chastain	Chevrolet	0:48.808	183.165 mph (294.775 km/h)
Race Lap Records
Race (500 miles - 1 Lap)	2020	February 17	Erik Jones	Toyota	0:43.682	206.034 mph (331.580 km/h)
Race (500 miles)	1980	February 17	Buddy Baker	Oldsmobile	2:48:55	177.602 mph (285.823 km/h)
Race (400 miles - 1 Lap)	1998	October 17	Dale Earnhardt	Chevrolet	0:47.026	191.383 mph (308.001 km/h)
Race (400 miles)	1980	July 4	Bobby Allison	Mercury	2:18:21	173.473 mph (279.178 km/h)
NASCAR O'Reilly Auto Parts Series
Qualifying Lap Record
Qualifying	1987		Tommy Houston	Buick	0:46.298	194.389 mph (312.839 km/h)
Race Lap Record
Race (300 miles - 1 Lap)	2019	February 16	Jeffrey Earnhardt	Toyota	0:45.554	197.568 mph (317.955 km/h)
Race (300 miles)	1985	February 16	Geoff Bodine	Pontiac	1:42:12	176.125 mph (283.446 km/h)
Race (250 miles - 1 Lap)	2025	August 22	Aric Almirola	Toyota	0:46.608	193.100 mph (310.764 km/h)
Race (250 miles)	2003	July 4	Dale Earnhardt Jr.	Chevrolet	1:37:35	153.715 mph (247.380 km/h)
NASCAR Truck Series
Qualifying	2015	February 20	Spencer Gallagher	Chevrolet	0:47.332	190.146 mph (306.010 km/h)
Race (250 miles - 1 Lap)	2019	February 15	David Gilliland	Toyota	0:46.008	195.618 mph (314.817 km/h)
IROC
Race (100 miles)	1996	February 16	Dale Earnhardt	Pontiac	0:47.926	187.793 mph (302.224 km/h)
ARCA Menards Series
Qualifying	1987	February 8	Bill Venturini	Chevrolet	0:44.954	200.209 mph (322.205 km/h)
Race (200 miles)	1998	February 8	Kenny Irwin Jr.	Ford	1:18:20	153.191 mph (246.537 km/h)
ARCA Menards Series East
Qualifying	1989	February 18	Kenny Wallace	Pontiac	0:46.810	192.271 mph (309.430 km/h)
Race (300 miles)	1995	February 18	Chad Little	Ford	1:59:25	150.732 mph (242.580 km/h)
USAC IndyCar
Qualifying	1959	April 4	Dick Rathman	Kurtis	0:51.970	173.21 mph (278.75 km/h)
Race (100 miles)	1959	April 4	Jim Rathmann	Watson	52.861	170.261 mph (274.009 km/h)

=== Race lap records ===
As of January 2026, the fastest official race lap records at the Daytona International Speedway are listed as:

Category	Time	Driver	Vehicle	Event
Tri-Oval (1959–present): 2.500 mi (4.023 km)
NASCAR Cup	0:43.682	Erik Jones	Toyota Camry NASCAR	2020 Daytona 500
NASCAR Xfinity	0:45.554	Jeffrey Earnhardt	Toyota GR Supra NASCAR	2019 NASCAR Racing Experience 300
NASCAR Truck	0:46.008	David Gilliland	Toyota Tundra NASCAR	2019 NextEra Energy 250
ARCA Menards	0:48.256	Amber Balcaen	Toyota Camry NASCAR	2024 Hard Rock Bet 200
Sports Car Course (1985–present): 3.560 mi (5.729 km)
DPi	1:33.724	Álex Palou	Cadillac DPi-V.R	2022 24 Hours of Daytona
LMP2	1:35.532	Paul-Loup Chatin	Oreca 07	2022 24 Hours of Daytona
LMDh	1:35.554	Tom Blomqvist	Cadillac V-Series.R	2024 24 Hours of Daytona
LMH	1:37.785	Ross Gunn	Aston Martin Valkyrie AMR-LMH	2026 24 Hours of Daytona
Group C	1:38.495	Masahiro Hasemi	Nissan R91CP	1992 24 Hours of Daytona
IMSA GTP	1:38.596	Jan Lammers	Jaguar XJR-12D	1990 24 Hours of Daytona
DP	1:39.180	Sébastien Bourdais	Chevrolet Corvette DP	2014 24 Hours of Daytona
WSC	1:40.545	Max Papis	Ferrari 333 SP	1998 24 Hours of Daytona
LMP900	1:42.078	Jan Lammers	Crawford SSC2K	2002 24 Hours of Daytona
LMP3	1:42.133	Felipe Fraga	Ligier JS P320	2022 24 Hours of Daytona
LM GTE	1:42.168	Jesse Krohn	BMW M8 GTE	2020 24 Hours of Daytona
LMPC	1:42.716	Patricio O'Ward	Oreca FLM09	2017 24 Hours of Daytona
TA1	1:43.289	Chris Dyson	Ford Mustang Trans-Am	2019 Daytona Trans-Am round
GT3	1:44.541	Marcos Gomes	Ferrari 488 GT3	2019 24 Hours of Daytona
Ferrari Challenge	1:46.068	Dylan Medler	Ferrari 296 Challenge	2025 Daytona Ferrari Challenge North America round
GT1 (GTS)	1:47.917	Ron Fellows	Chevrolet Corvette C5-R	2000 24 Hours of Daytona
Porsche Carrera Cup	1:47.983	Patrick Pilet	Porsche 911 (997) GT3 Cup 3.8	2013 24 Hours of Daytona
Formula Atlantic	1:48.162	Tyler Hunter	Swift 014.a	2015 Daytona SCCA Runoffs Formula Atlantic round
IMSA GTS	1:49.604	Robby Gordon	Ford Mustang	1993 24 Hours of Daytona
LMP675	1:49.731	Terry Borcheller	Lola B2K/40	2002 Pepsi 400
TA2	1:50.470	Sam Mayer	Chevrolet Camaro Trans-Am	2019 Daytona Trans-Am round
GT2	1:50.927	Olivier Beretta	Dodge Viper GTS-R	1999 24 Hours of Daytona
IMSA GTP Lights	1:51.009	Parker Johnstone	Spice SE91P	1992 24 Hours of Daytona
Formula 1000	1:51.616	JR Osborne	Ralph Firman RFR F1000	2015 Daytona SCCA Runoffs Formula 1000 round
IMSA GTO	1:51.774	Darin Brassfield	Ford Thunderbird	1985 3 Hours of Daytona
GT	1:52.354	Timo Bernhard	Porsche 911 GT3-RS	2003 24 Hours of Daytona
GT4	1:52.625	Michael Cooper	McLaren Artura GT4	2025 BMW M Endurance Challenge at Daytona
American GT	1:54.206	Joe Varde	Chevrolet Corvette C5	2001 24 Hours of Daytona
TCR Touring Car	1:57.703	Eric Powell	Hyundai Elantra N TCR	2025 BMW M Endurance Challenge at Daytona
Pro Mazda	1:58.029	Joseph Burton-Harris	Star Formula Mazda 'Pro'	2015 Daytona SCCA Runoffs Formula Mazda round
IMSA GTS-2	2:00.432	Wolfgang Land	Porsche 911 Carrera (993)	1995 24 Hours of Daytona
IMSA GTU	2:01.031	Jay Cochran	Porsche 911 Turbo	1994 24 Hours of Daytona
Mazda MX-5 Cup	2:06.544	Gresham Wagner	Mazda MX-5 (ND)	2023 Daytona Mazda MX-5 Cup round
Long Motorcycle Course (2009–present): 3.510 mi (5.649 km)
Supersport	1:47.879	Josh Herrin	Ducati Panigale V2	2025 Daytona 200
Twins Cup	1:55.413	Stefano Mesa	Aprilia RS660	2024 Daytona MotoAmerica Twins Cup round
Short Motorcycle Course (2008–present): 2.900 mi (4.667 km)
Superbike	1:36.266	Mat Mladin	Suzuki GSX-R1000	2008 Daytona AMA Superbike round
Supersport	1:39.604	Neil Hodgson	Honda CBR600RR	2008 Daytona 200
NASCAR Road Course (2020–2021): 3.570 mi (5.745 km)
NASCAR Cup	1:55.677	Chase Elliott	Chevrolet Camaro ZL1	2021 O'Reilly Auto Parts 253
NASCAR Xfinity	1:58.106	Ty Gibbs	Toyota Supra NASCAR	2021 Super Start Batteries 188
NASCAR Truck	2:00.689	Ben Rhodes	Toyota Tundra NASCAR	2021 BrakeBest Select 159
Motorcycle Course (2005–2007): 2.950 mi (4.747 km)
Superbike	1:38.091	Ben Spies	Suzuki GSX-R1000	2006 Daytona AMA Superbike round
Supersport	1:39.604	Roger Lee Hayden	Kawasaki Ninja ZX-6RR	2006 Daytona AMA Supersport round
Motorcycle Course (1984–2004): 3.560 mi (5.729 km)
Superbike	1:49.227	Eric Bostrom	Ducati 999R	2004 Daytona 200
Supersport	1:52.955	Jason DiSalvo	Yamaha YZF-R6	2004 Daytona AMA Supersport round
Sports Car Road Course (1984): 3.870 mi (6.228 km)
IMSA GTP	1:45.209	Derek Bell	Porsche 962	1984 3 Hours of Daytona
IMSA GTO	1:53.984	Wally Dallenbach Jr.	Ford Mustang	1984 3 Hours of Daytona
IMSA GTU	2:03.027	Elliot Forbes-Robinson	Porsche 924 Carrera	1984 3 Hours of Daytona
Sports Car Road Course (1975–1983): 3.840 mi (6.180 km)
IMSA GTP	1:45.360	Danny Ongais	Lola T600	1982 3 Hours of Daytona
IMSA GTX	1:46.342	Danny Ongais	Porsche 935 K3/80	1980 Daytona Finale 250 Miles
IMSA GTO	1:53.130	Don Devendorf	Nissan 280ZX Turbo	1983 Summer Speed Week '83 Daytona
Group 4	1:53.890	Kenper Miller	BMW M1	1981 IMSA National Championship Finale Daytona
IMSA GTU	2:02.418	Walt Bohren	Mazda RX-7	1980 Daytona Finale 250 Miles
F750	2:07.431 (Note: The reference only showed the record speed, so this lap time was actually found and calculated by dividing the record speed to track length.)	Kenny Roberts	Yamaha TZ750	1978 Daytona Formula 750 round
IMSA AAC	2:07.599	Gene Felton	Buick Skylark	1978 Daytona Fire Cracker 400
Sports Car Road Course (1959–1974): 3.810 mi (6.132 km)
Group 5 (Sports Car)	1:41.250	Mark Donohue	Ferrari 512 M	1971 24 Hours of Daytona
Motorcycle racing	1:45.700 (Note: The reference only showed the record speed, so this lap time was actually found and calculated by dividing the record speed to track length.)	Mel Lacher	Harley-Davidson KRTT	1965 Daytona 200
500cc	1:48.000	Mike Hailwood	MV Agusta 500 4C	1964 United States motorcycle Grand Prix
Group 4	1:48.700	Jo Siffert	Porsche 917K	1970 24 Hours of Daytona
Group 5 (Prototype)	1:49.604	Mike Hailwood	Mirage M6	1973 24 Hours of Daytona
Group 6	1:54.000	Jo Siffert	Porsche 908L	1969 24 Hours of Daytona
250cc	1:57.900	Alan Shepherd	MZ RZ 250 Twin	1964 United States motorcycle Grand Prix
125cc	2:04.000	Hugh Anderson	Suzuki 125 V4	1964 United States motorcycle Grand Prix
Group 3	2:08.200	Dave MacDonald	Shelby Daytona Coupe	1964 2000 km of Daytona
50cc	2:19.500	Hugh Anderson	Suzuki 50 GP	1964 United States motorcycle Grand Prix

== Weather and climate ==
Daytona has a humid subtropical climate (Köppen Cfa), which enables year-round use of the facility. Light frosts are in theory possible, but unlikely, during the 24-hour event's nighttime under clear conditions, but general racing conditions are mild also during winter. With a dry season taking place during the winter months, the 500 generally has good odds of being run without rain delays. The summer event under the floodlights is more likely to undergo disturbances, due to the rainy tendencies of the hot, muggy, and humid summers. Due to the complete difference of seasons, the two NASCAR Cup races at Daytona see vastly different track conditions.

Climate data for Daytona Beach Int'l, Florida (1981–2010 normals, extremes 1923–present)
Month	Jan	Feb	Mar	Apr	May	Jun	Jul	Aug	Sep	Oct	Nov	Dec	Year
Record high °F (°C)	92 (33)	89 (32)	92 (33)	96 (36)	100 (38)	102 (39)	102 (39)	101 (38)	99 (37)	95 (35)	90 (32)	88 (31)	102 (39)
Mean maximum °F (°C)	81.7 (27.6)	83.4 (28.6)	86.8 (30.4)	89.5 (31.9)	93.6 (34.2)	95.1 (35.1)	96.1 (35.6)	95.4 (35.2)	92.4 (33.6)	89.5 (31.9)	85.1 (29.5)	82.5 (28.1)	97.5 (36.4)
Mean daily maximum °F (°C)	68.4 (20.2)	70.7 (21.5)	74.5 (23.6)	79.2 (26.2)	84.7 (29.3)	88.4 (31.3)	90.2 (32.3)	89.6 (32.0)	86.9 (30.5)	82.0 (27.8)	76.0 (24.4)	70.4 (21.3)	80.1 (26.7)
Mean daily minimum °F (°C)	47.3 (8.5)	50.1 (10.1)	54.2 (12.3)	58.6 (14.8)	65.4 (18.6)	71.4 (21.9)	73.0 (22.8)	73.4 (23.0)	72.2 (22.3)	65.9 (18.8)	57.3 (14.1)	50.5 (10.3)	61.7 (16.5)
Mean minimum °F (°C)	29.6 (−1.3)	33.3 (0.7)	38.4 (3.6)	44.6 (7.0)	54.8 (12.7)	65.2 (18.4)	68.4 (20.2)	69.5 (20.8)	65.2 (18.4)	51.1 (10.6)	41.7 (5.4)	32.8 (0.4)	27.2 (−2.7)
Record low °F (°C)	15 (−9)	24 (−4)	26 (−3)	32 (0)	40 (4)	52 (11)	60 (16)	63 (17)	52 (11)	39 (4)	25 (−4)	19 (−7)	15 (−9)
Average rainfall inches (mm)	2.74 (70)	2.78 (71)	4.24 (108)	2.18 (55)	3.13 (80)	5.83 (148)	5.83 (148)	6.40 (163)	6.96 (177)	4.21 (107)	2.69 (68)	2.63 (67)	49.62 (1,260)
Average rainy days (≥ 0.01 in)	7.5	7.3	8.2	5.8	6.8	13.3	12.8	14.0	13.5	10.6	7.7	7.5	115.0
Mean daily sunshine hours	7.0	8.0	9.0	9.0	9.0	9.0	9.0	9.0	8.0	7.0	7.0	7.0	8.2
Percentage possible sunshine	64	73	75	69	64	64	64	69	67	64	64	70	67
Source 1: NOAA
Source 2: Weather Atlas (sunshine data)

== Gallery ==
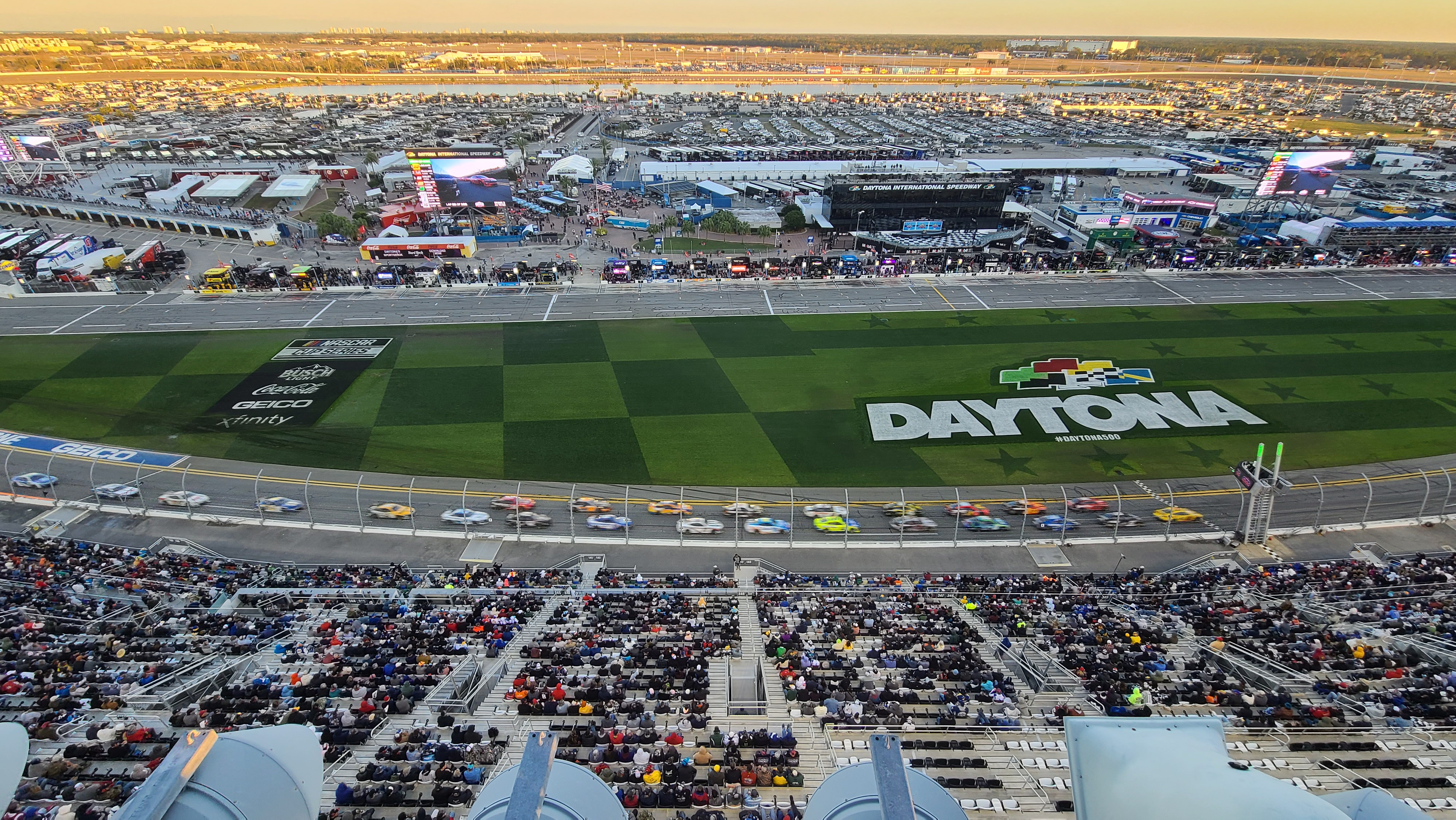
View of cars racing on the front stretch at the 2024 Daytona 500

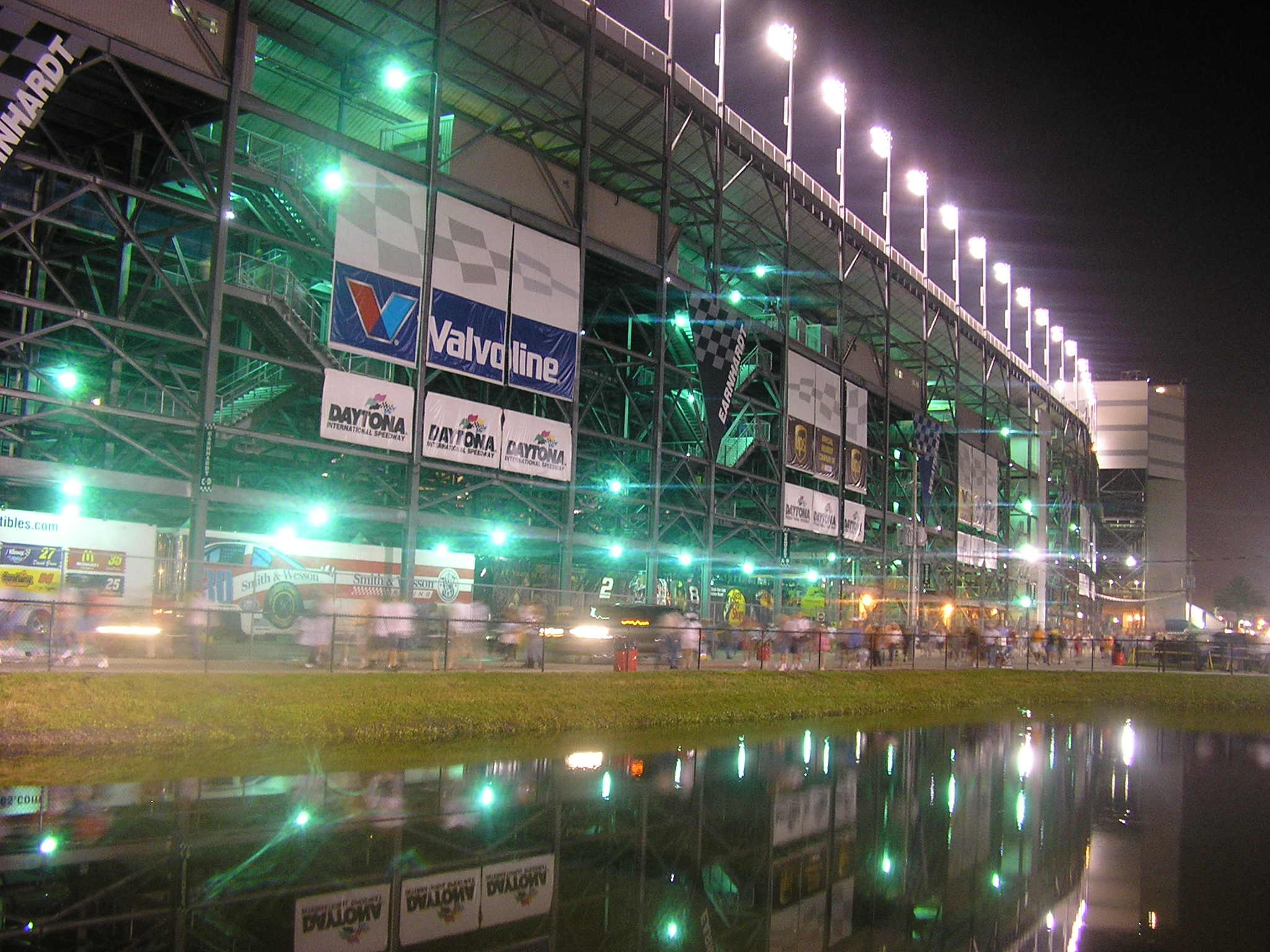
Main Entrance at night (prior to renovation)

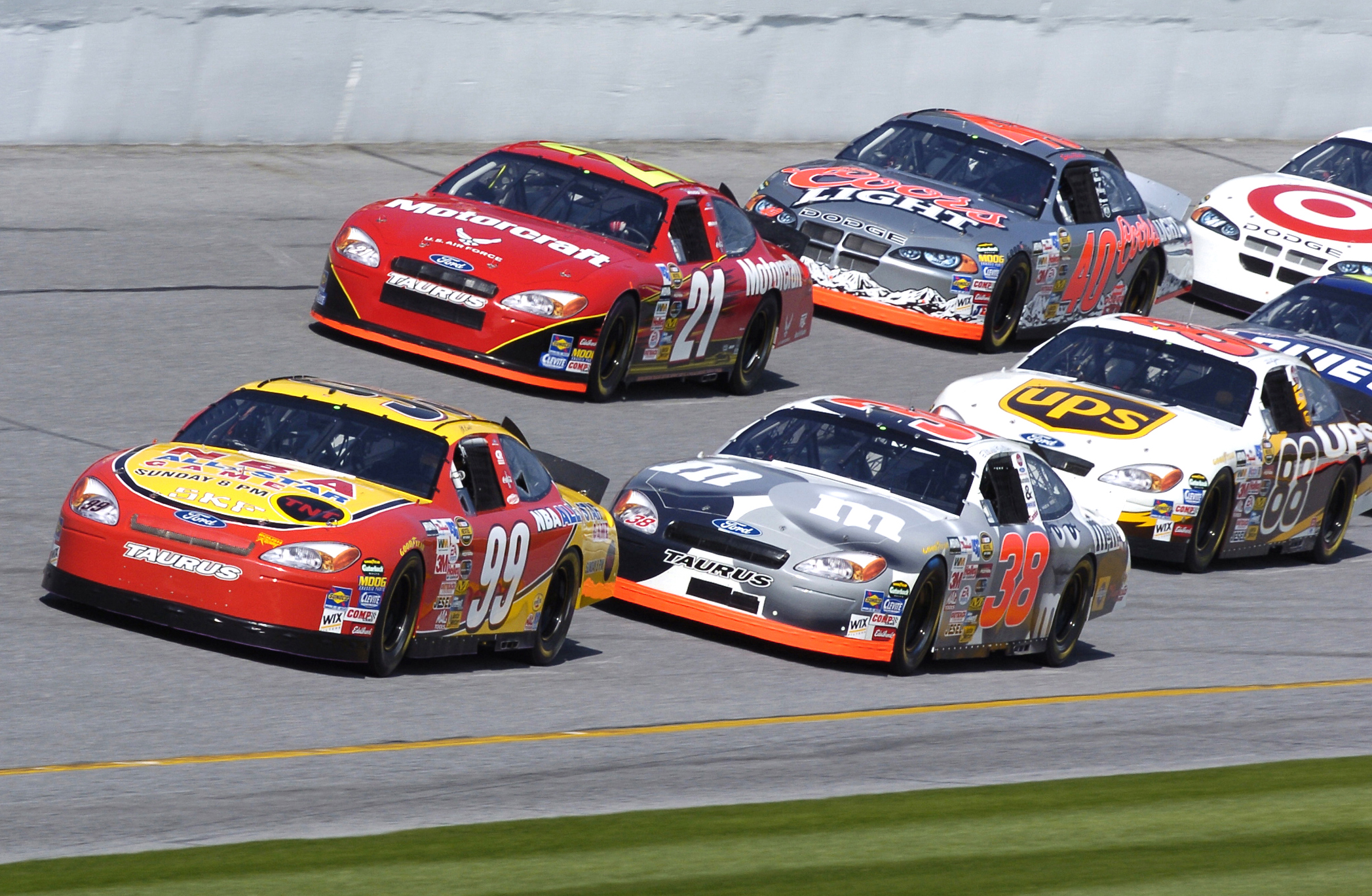
Cars practicing in 2004

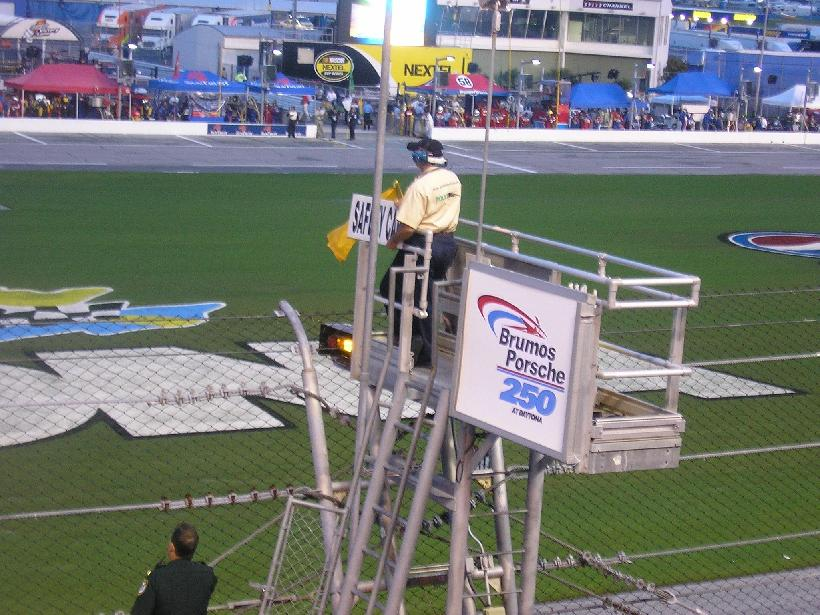
Old Flagstand

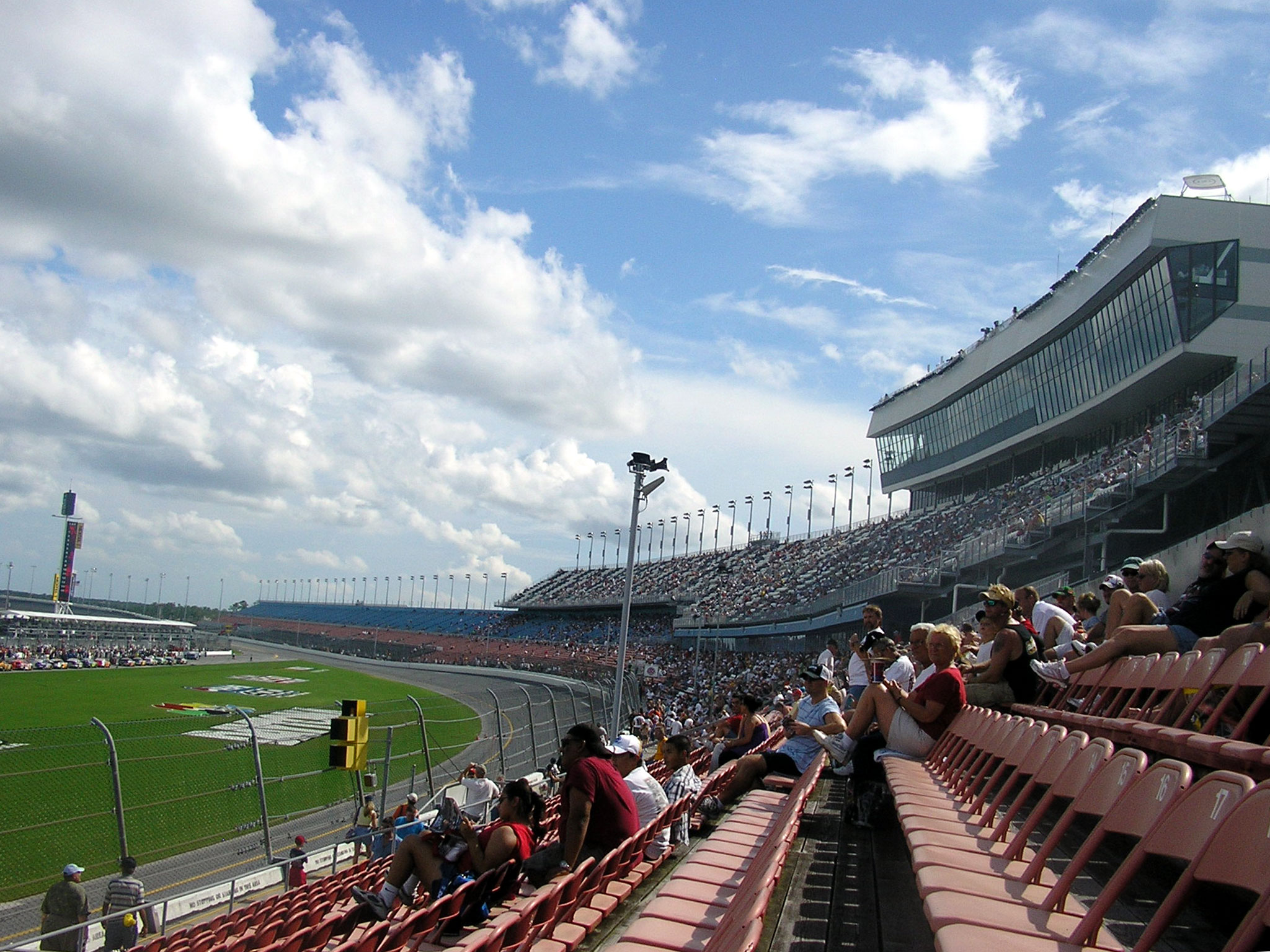
Grandstand (prior to renovation)

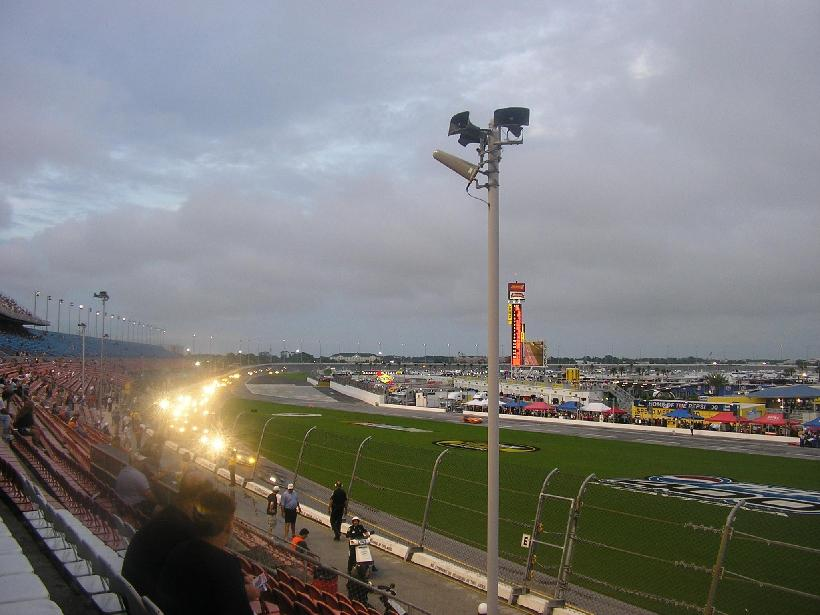
Paul Revere 250 restart after a caution

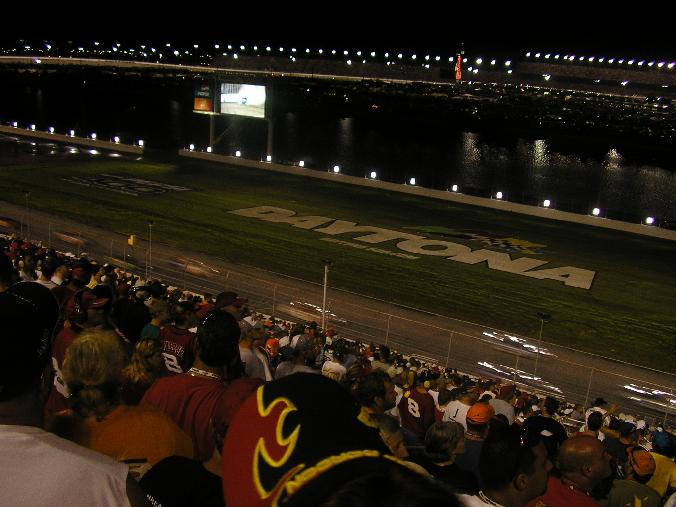
View from the former backstretch grandstands at night

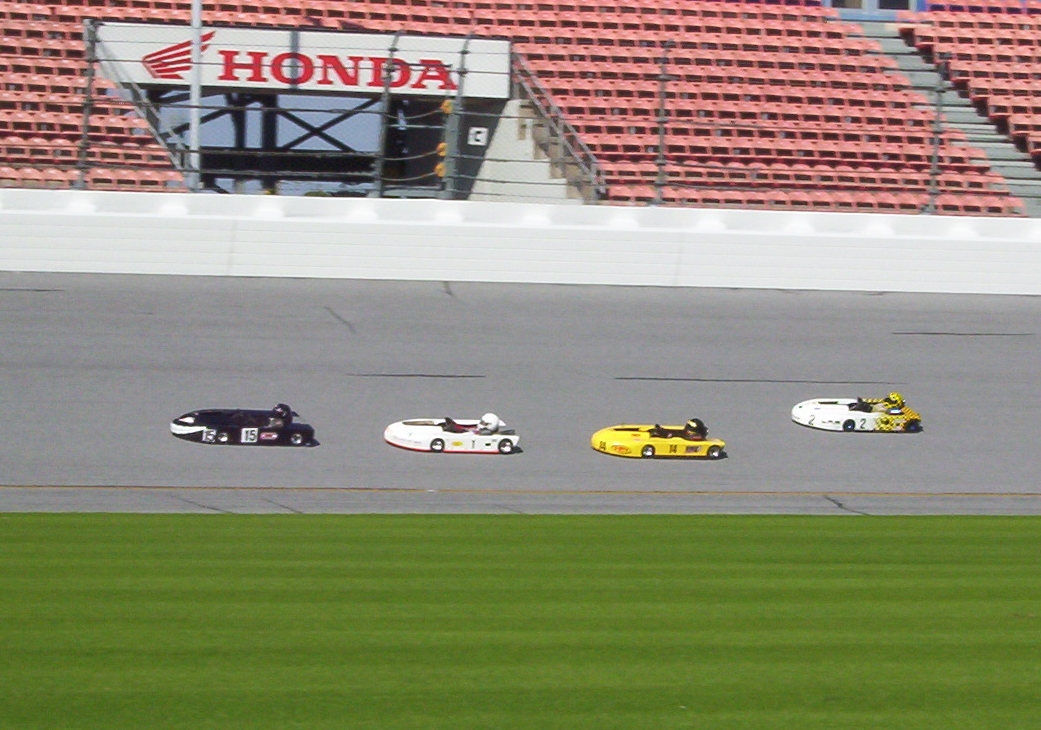
Endurance kart race

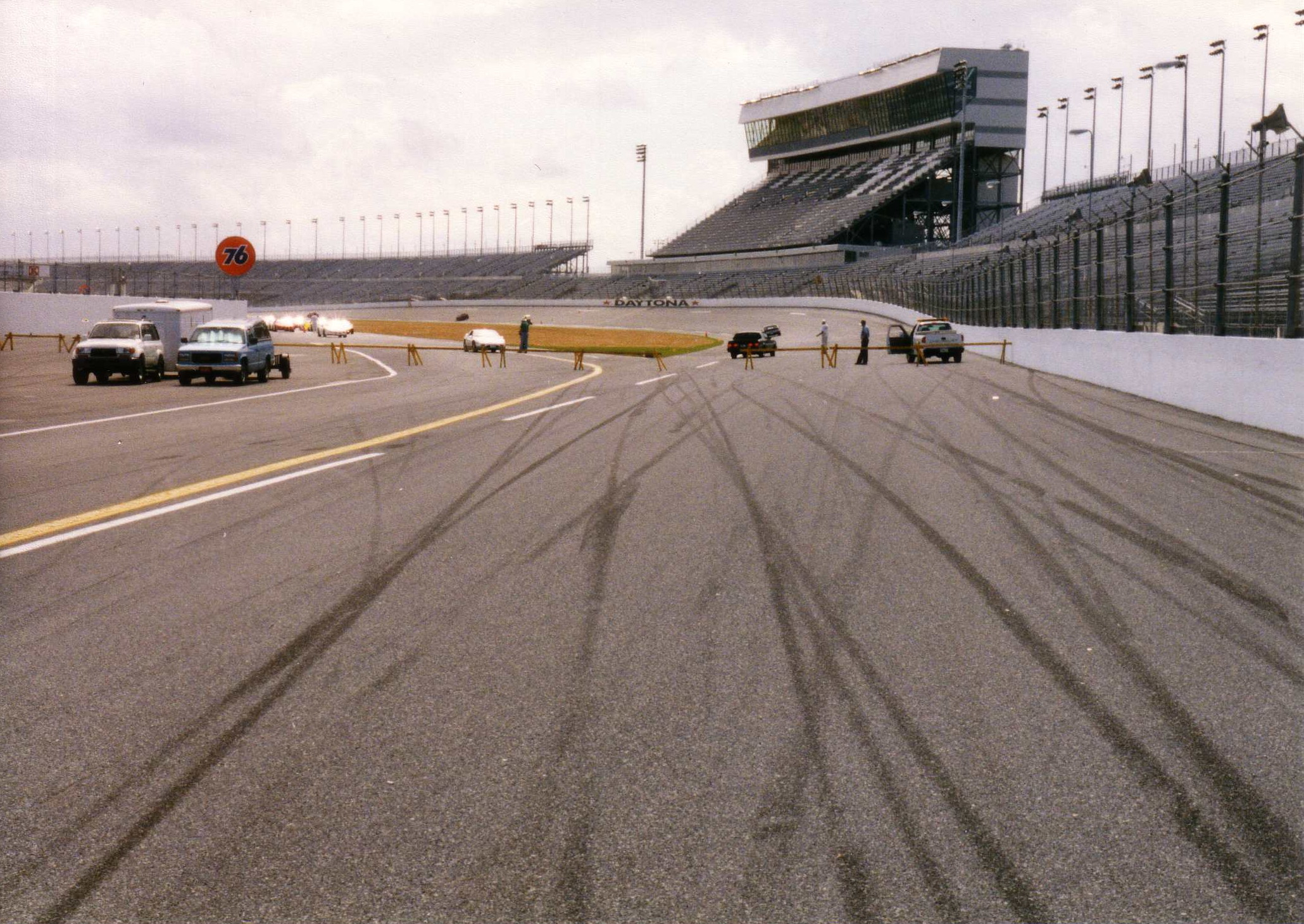
Racetrack skidmarks and view of old grandstand

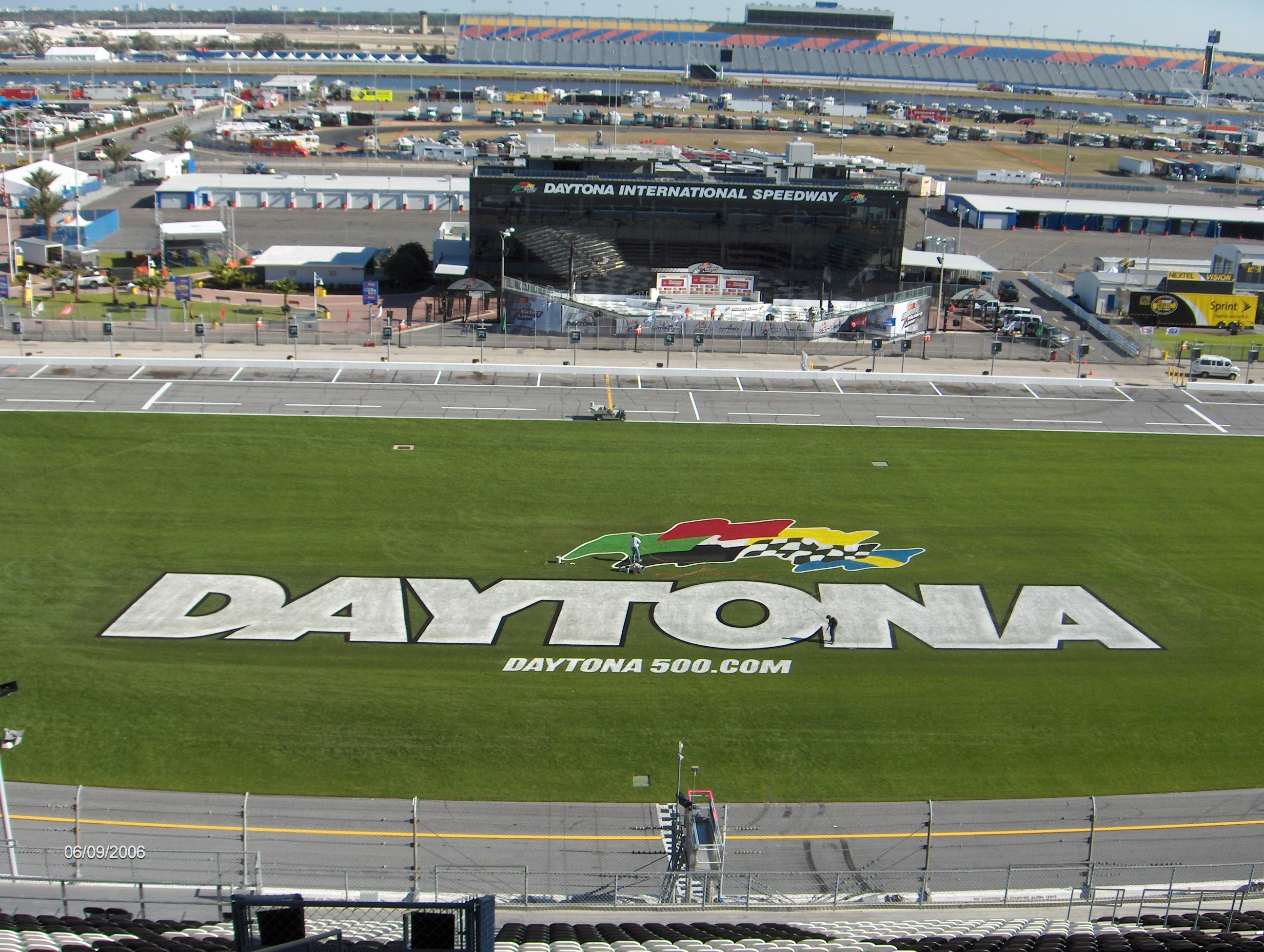

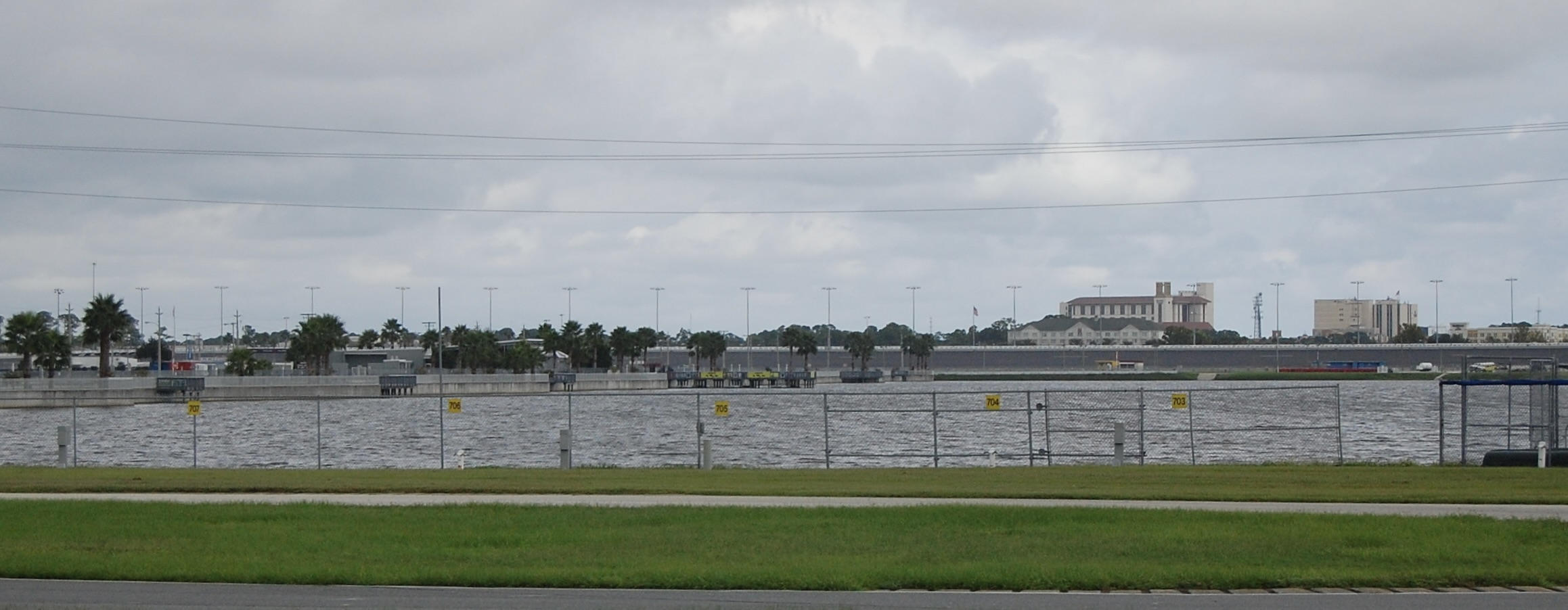
View of Lake Lloyd

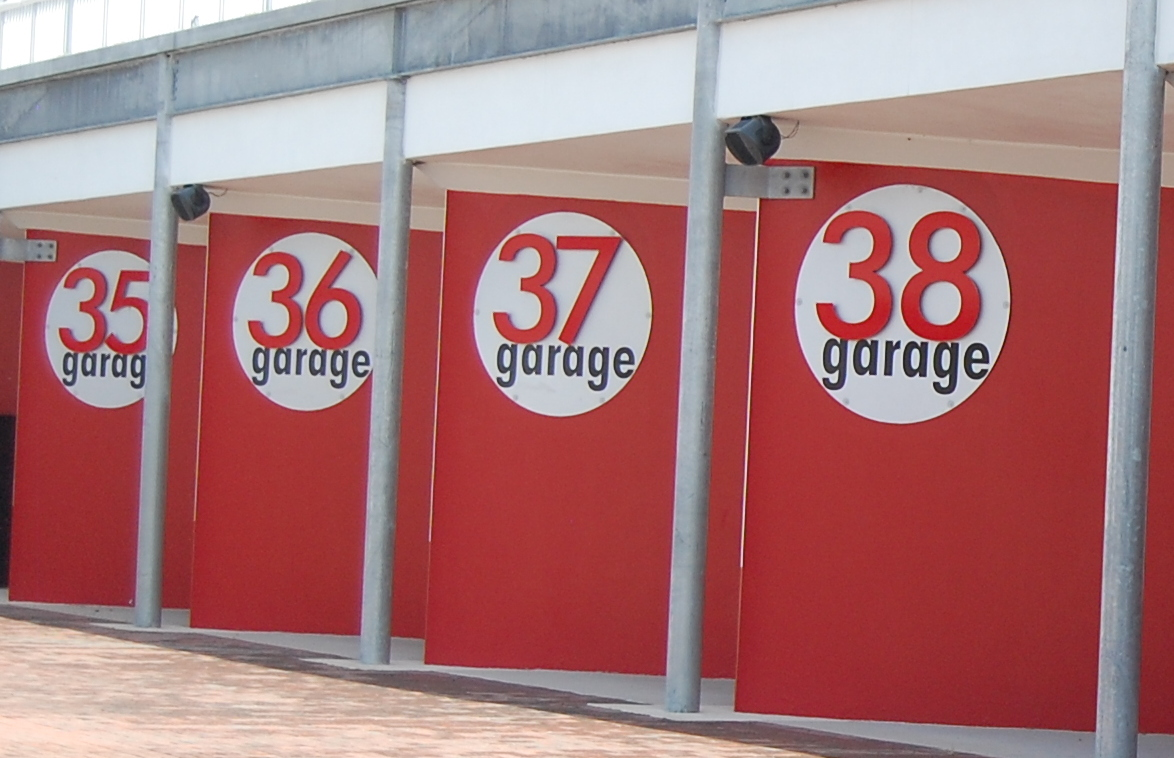
Infield garages

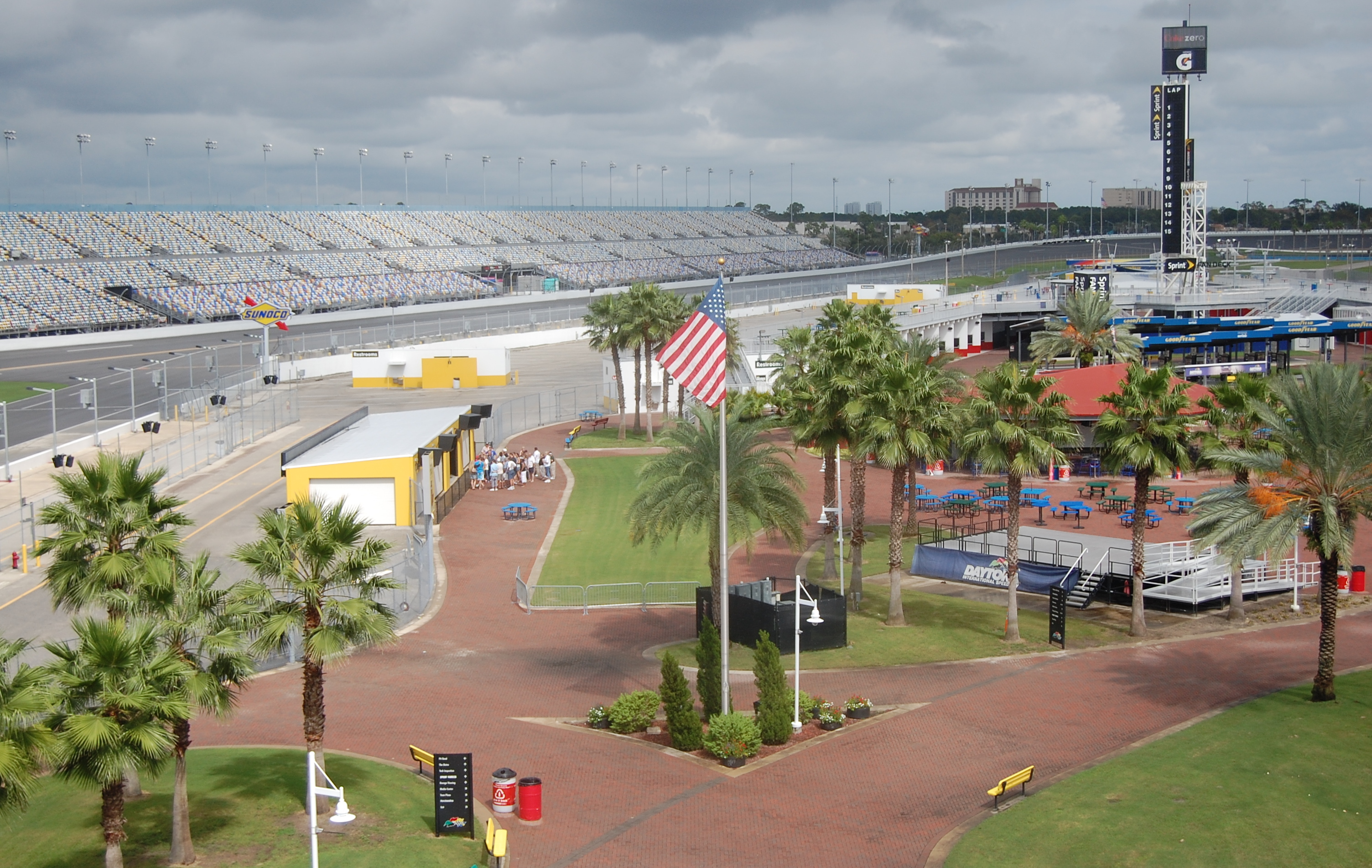
Infield view from President's Row

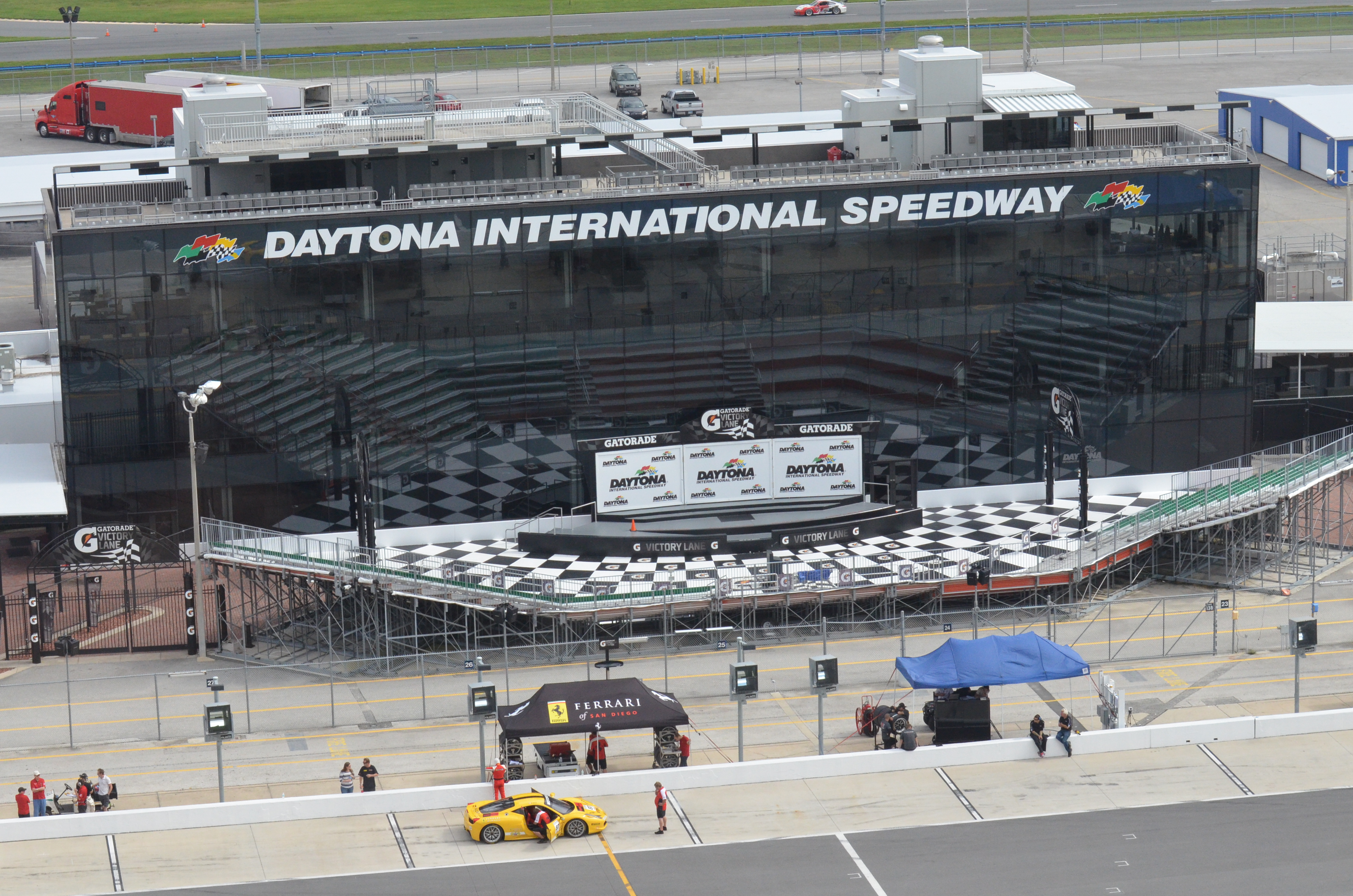
View of Victory Lane from a skybox

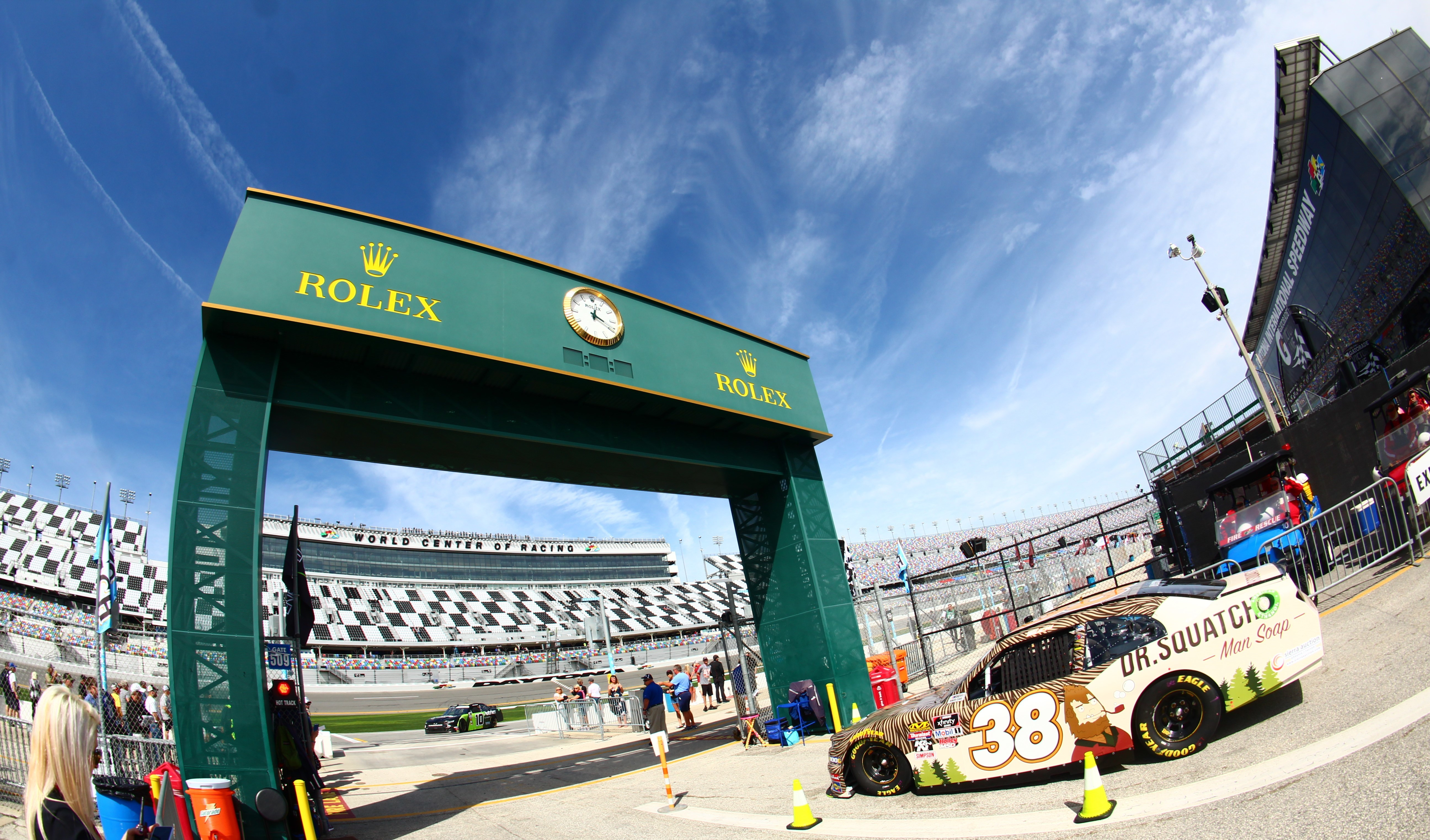
Rolex Clock at the garage

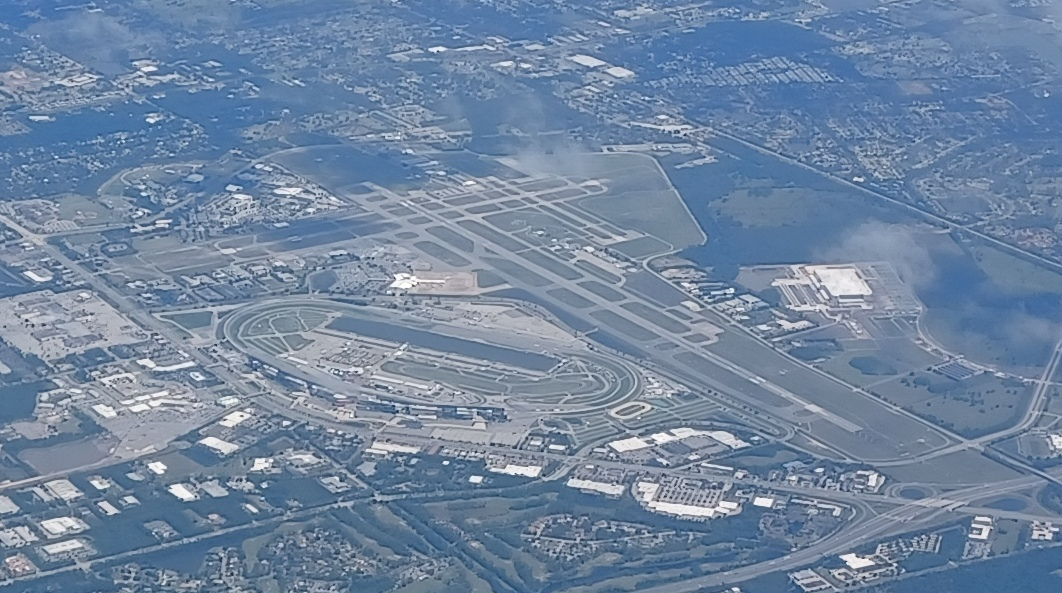
Aerial view

== See also ==
- 944 Cup
- List of Daytona International Speedway fatalities
- Daytona 500 Experience
- Motorsports Hall of Fame of America
