= Roger Eagleton =

American race car driver and entrepreneur

Roger Eagleton is an American race car driver and entrepreneur, born in Glendale, California. He is currently based in Waikiki, Honolulu, and is the 2019 Trans-Am West Coast Champion in the GT Class.

== Racing career ==
Eagleton first competed in Motorsports 2008 in the Jim Russell Championship Series where he finished fifth overall. He was Sports Car Club of America San Francisco Region BMW E30 Class Champion the same year. In 2013, he was the National Auto Sport Association (NASA) 25 Hours of Thunderhill E3 class winner. In 2014, he was again NASA 25 Hours of Thunderhill E3 Class winner. In 2015, he was the Sportsman Class Champion in the United States Touring Car Championship, winning five races driving a 1996 BMW M3. In 2016, Eagleton won the 6-hour Enduro race in the E3 class and in the same year finished third in the USTCC Super Touring Class Championship. In 2017, he again won at the 25 hours of Thunderhill, this time in the EXR class while also finishing second in the E0 class.

2018 was a successful year for Eagleton, winning the T2 class in the SCCA Majors at Thunderhill and at Kent, Washington. He also won at Buttonwillow and Portland, also under SCCA jurisdiction, in the T2 class in the Hoosier Super Tour. These wins made Eagleton the Western Conference Class Champion in the T2 class. In the 25 hours of Thunderhill he was first in the EXR class.

In 2019, Eagleton competed in the Trans Am presented by Pirelli West Coast Championship GT class. He was Championship leader after winning the race at Thunderhill in April and finishing second at Laguna Seca, Sonoma and Portland International Raceway, then went on to become 2019 Champion after securing second place at Circuit of the Americas.
