= NASCAR engines =

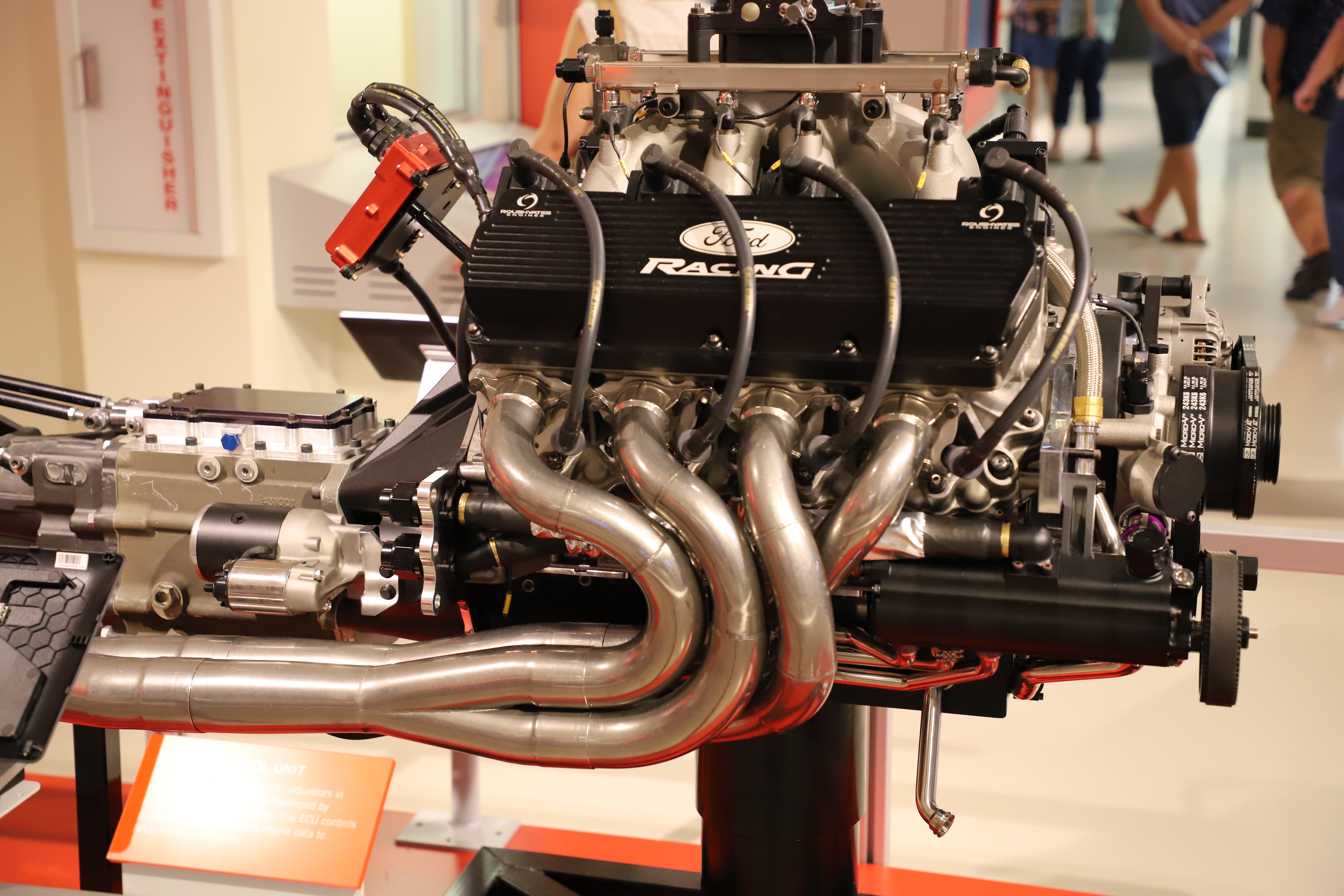

Overview
- Manufacturer: (United States) Ford (1950–present) (United States) Chevrolet (1955–present) (Japan) Toyota TRD (2004–present) (United States) Dodge (1953–1985, 2001–2012) (United States) Pontiac (1959–2004) (United States) Buick (1981–1987) (United States) Oldsmobile (1949–1987) (United States) Hudson (1951–1954) (United States) Plymouth (1959–1977) (United States) Chrysler (1954–1956, 1981–1985) (United States) Mercury (1952–1987) (United States) Nash (1950–1951) (United States) AMC (1971–1978)
- Production: 1949–present

Layout
- Configuration: 90° pushrod V-8; 60°–90° V-6 (Busch Series only; 1982–1994); I-6 (Hudson Hornet)
- Displacement: 231–440 cu in (3.8–7.2 L)
- Cylinder bore: 3.8–4.185 in (97–106 mm)
- Piston stroke: 3.25–4.5 in (83–114 mm)
- Valvetrain: 16-valve, OHV, two-valves per cylinder
- Compression ratio: 7.2:1–14:1

Combustion
- Supercharger: Naturally-aspirated
- Fuel system: Carburetor / Electronic fuel injection
- Fuel type: Gasoline
- Oil system: Dry sump

Output
- Power output: 135–750 hp (101–559 kW)
- Torque output: 253–783 lb⋅ft (343–1,062 N⋅m)

Dimensions
- Dry weight: 575 lb (261 kg)

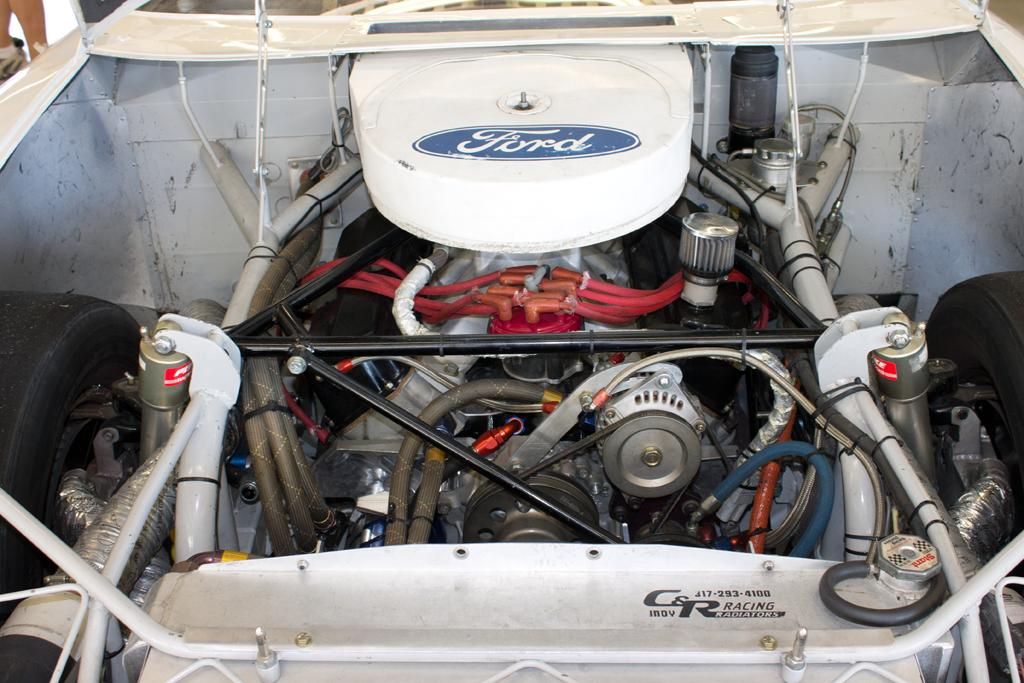
Ford NASCAR engine.

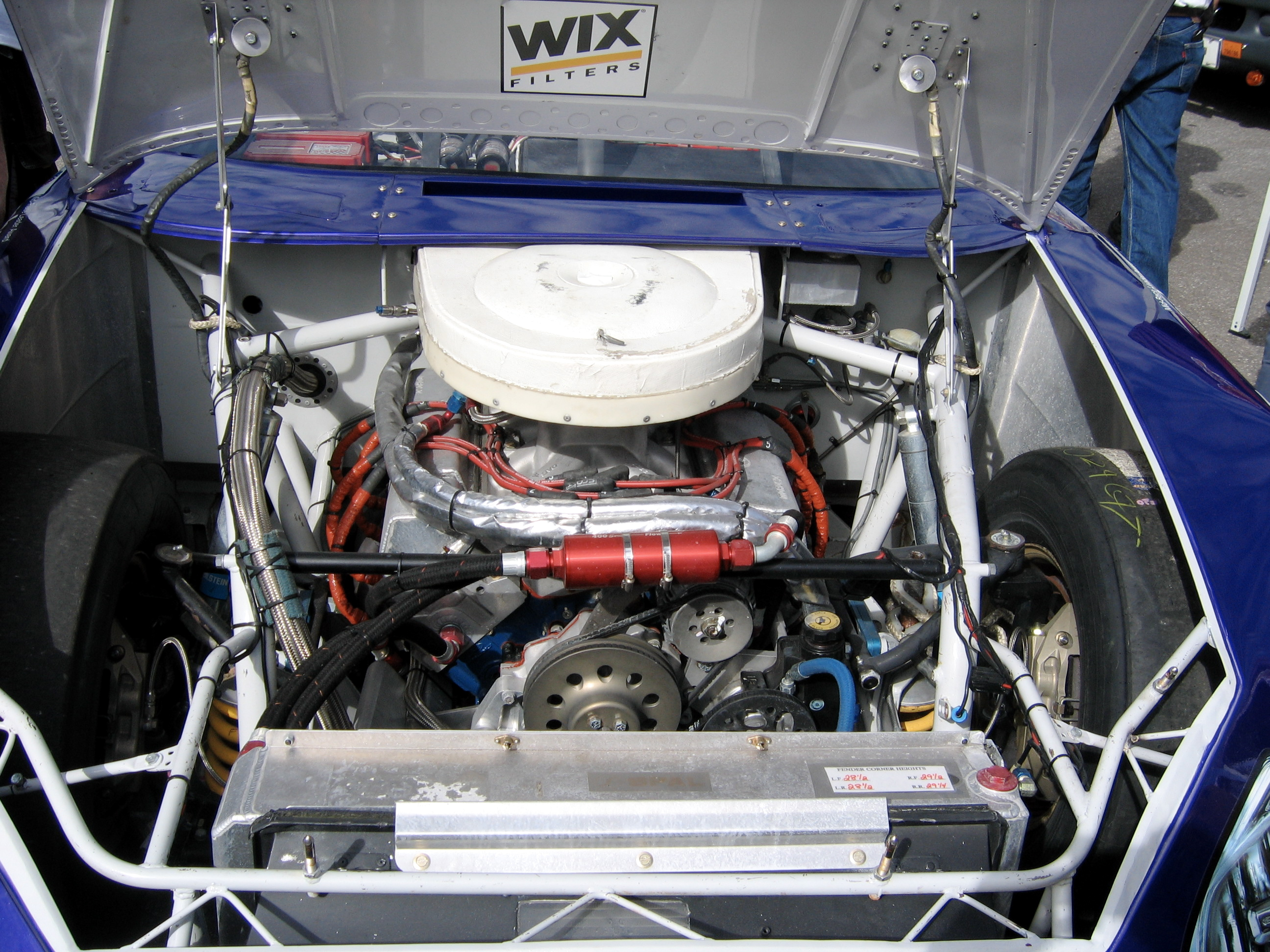
NASCAR engine bay.

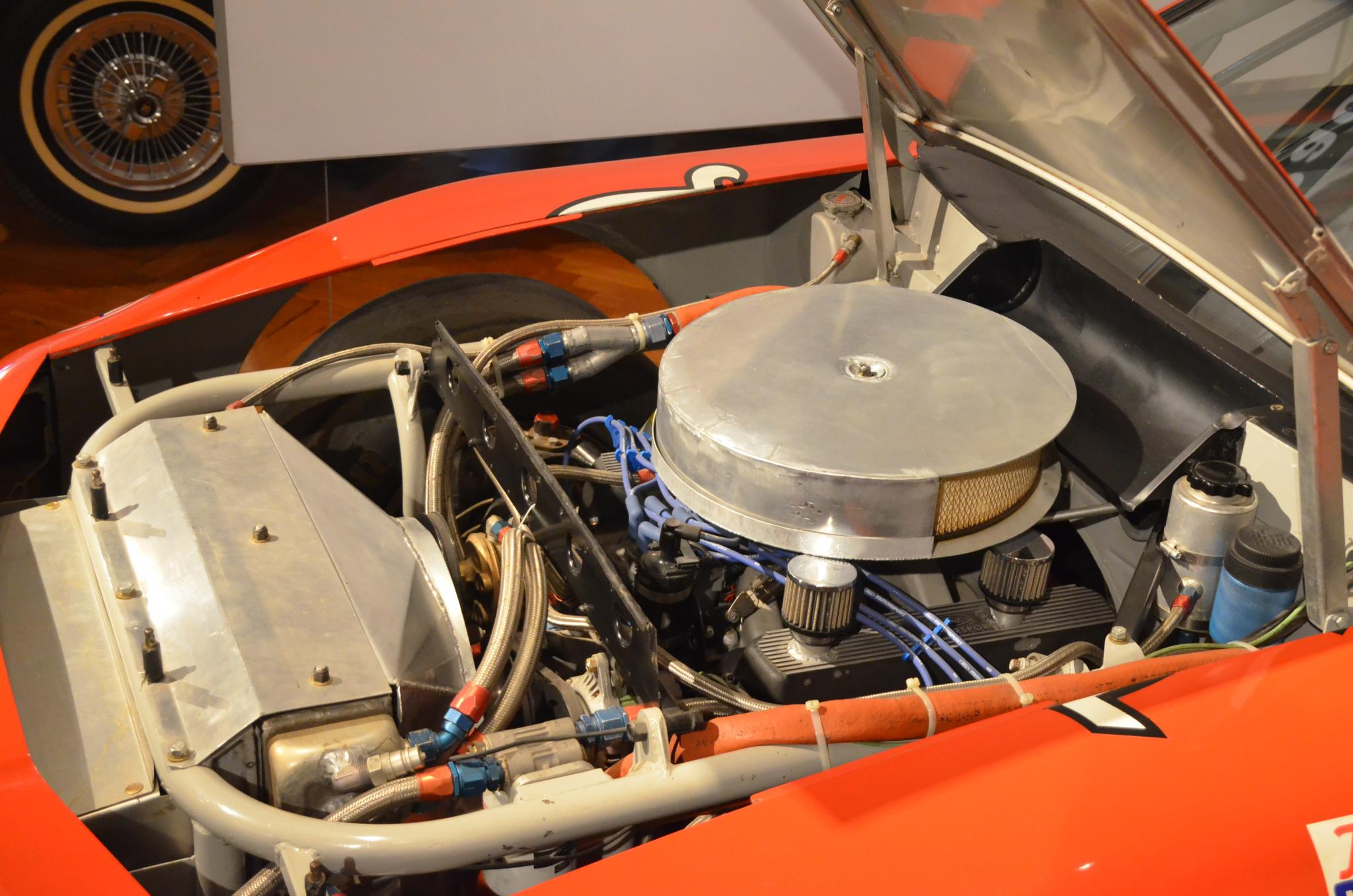
1987 Ford Thunderbird stock car engine.

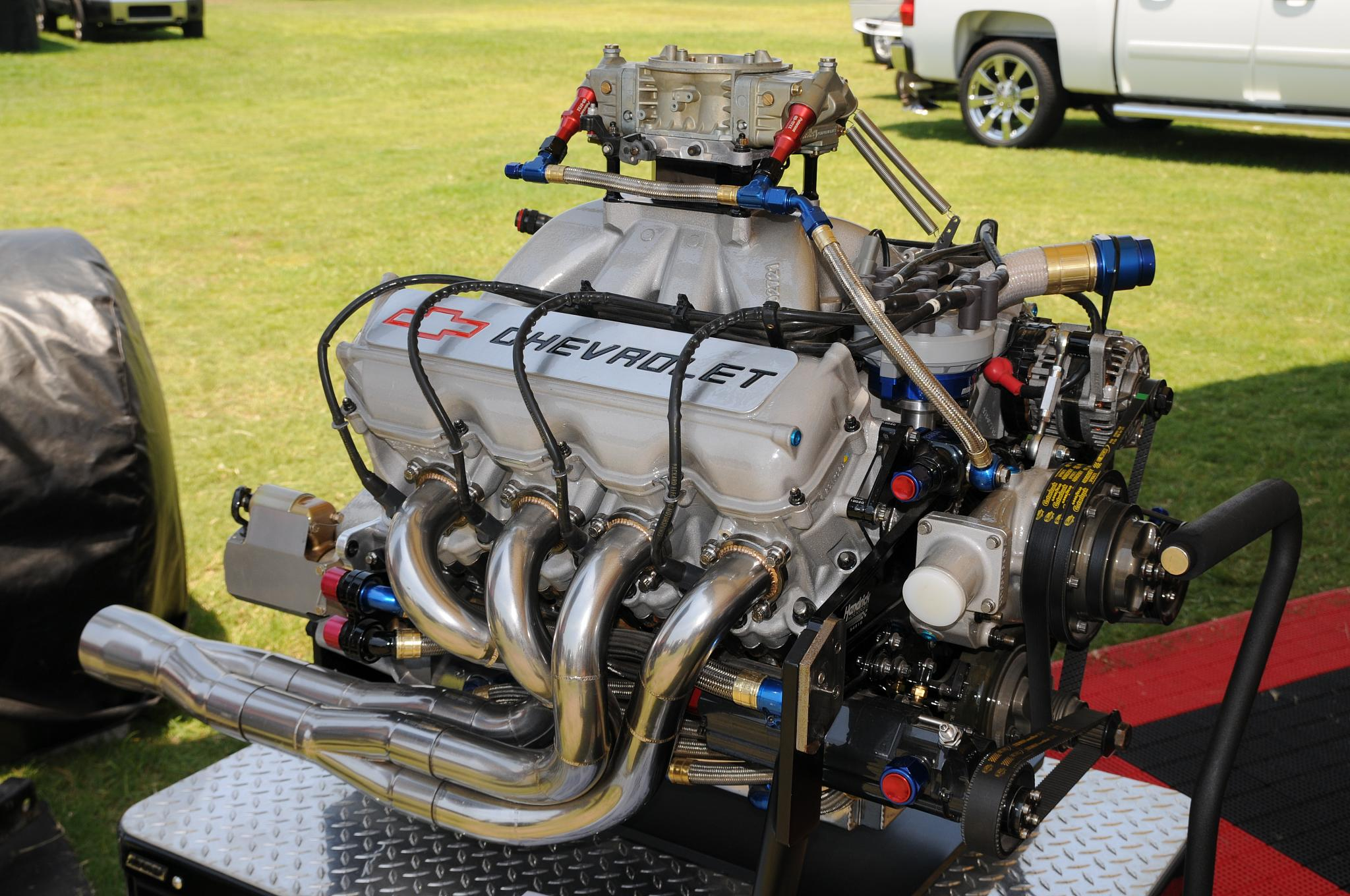
Chevrolet NASCAR V-8 motor.

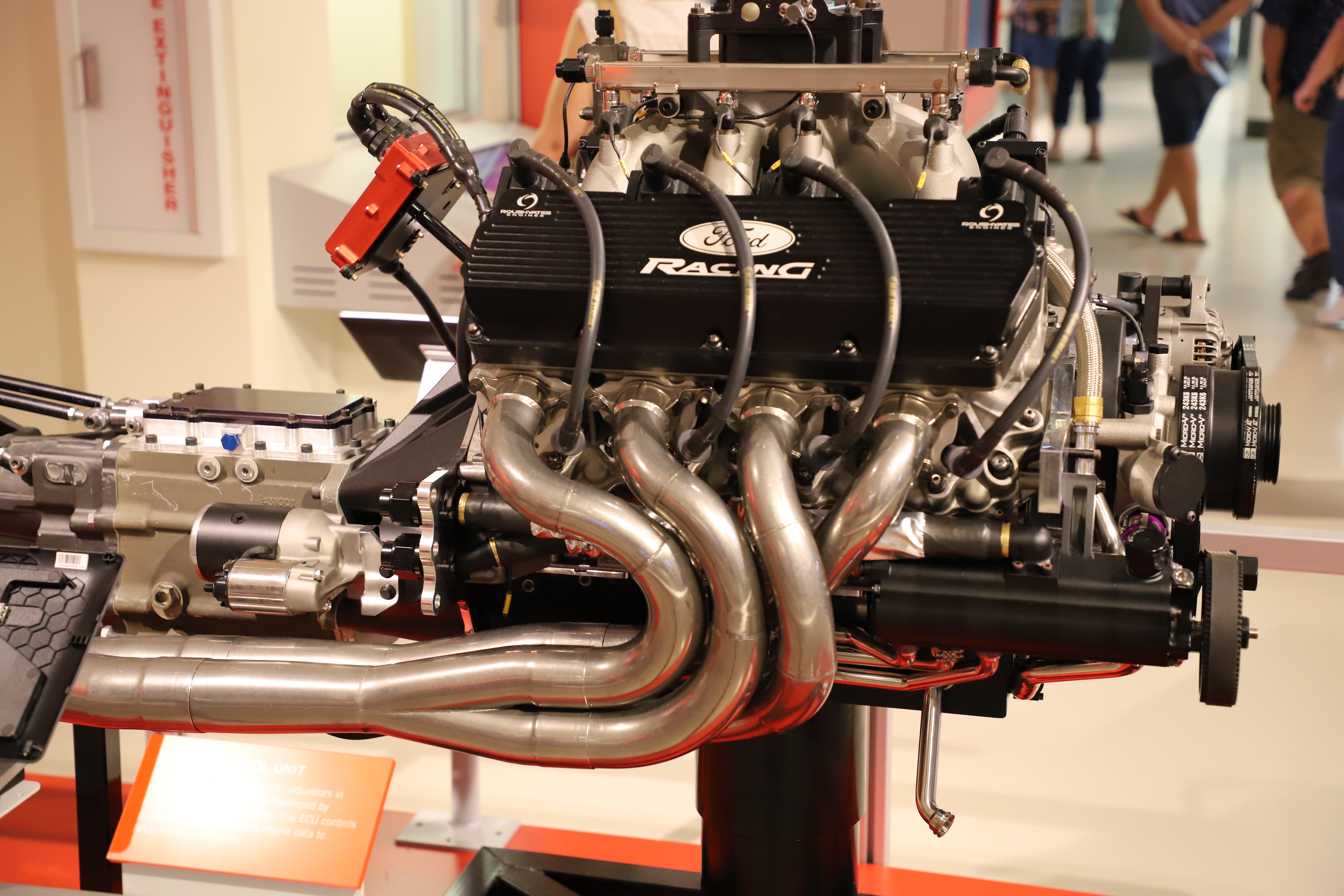
Ford V-8 stock car engine.

NASCAR, the highest governing body and top level division for stock car racing in the United States, has used a range of different types of engine configurations and displacements since its inaugural season in 1949. The engines are currently used in the Cup Series, O'Reilly Series, Craftsman Truck Series, and the Whelen Modified Tour.

== Overview ==
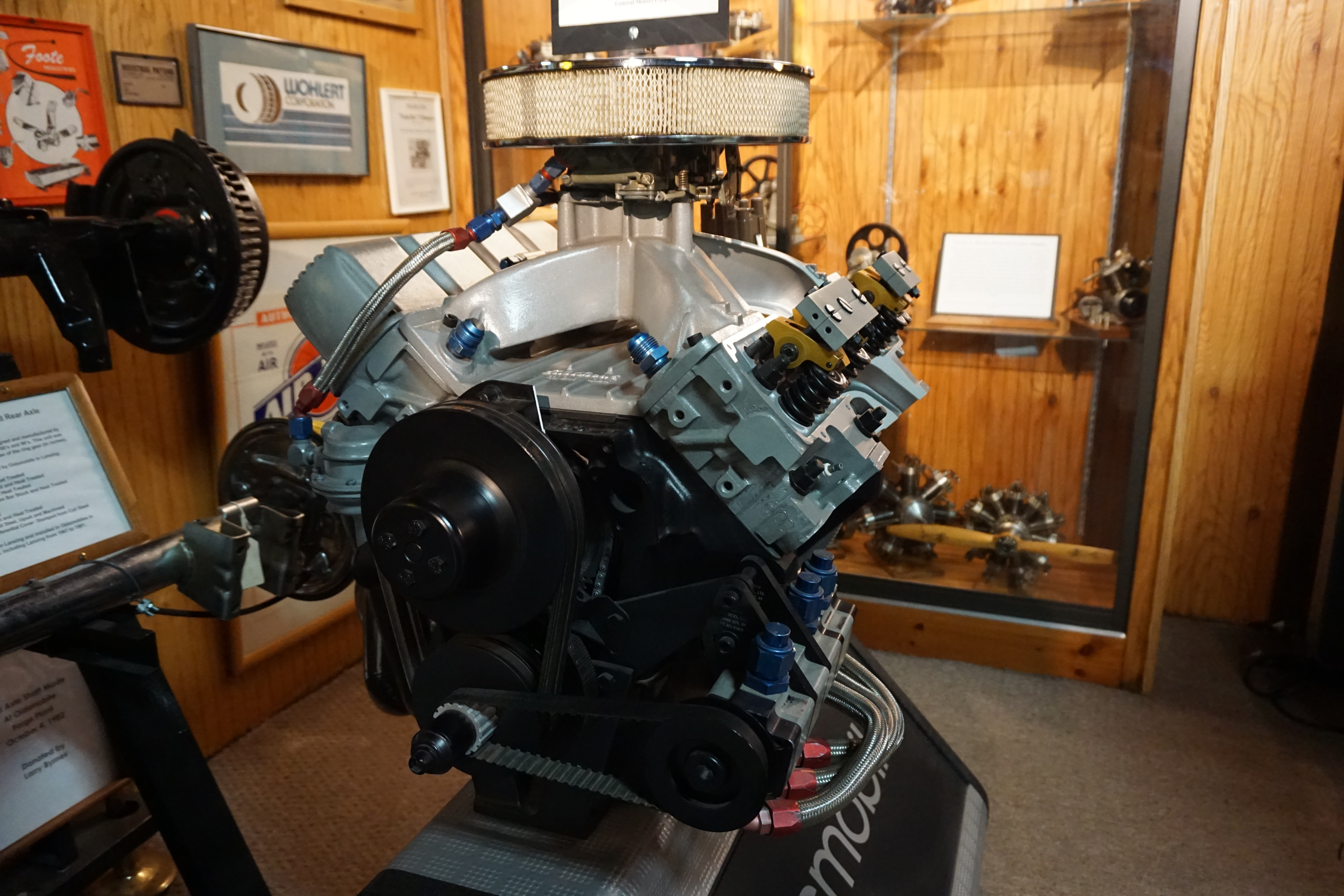
1988–91 Oldsmobile NASCAR V8 engine.

The 1949 Oldsmobile Rocket V-8, with a displacement of 303 cu in (5.0 L), is widely recognized as the first postwar modern overhead valve (OHV) engine to become available to the public. The Oldsmobile was an immediate success in 1949 and 1950, and all the automobile manufacturers could not help noticing the higher sales of the Oldsmobile 88 to the buying public. The motto of the day became "win on Sunday, sell on Monday."

At the time, it typically took three years for a new engine design to end up in production and be available for NASCAR racing. Most cars sold to the public did not have a wide variety of engine choices, and the majority of the buying public at the time was not interested in the large displacement special edition engine options that would soon become popular. However, the end of the Korean War in 1953 started an economic boom, and then car buyers immediately began demanding more powerful engines.

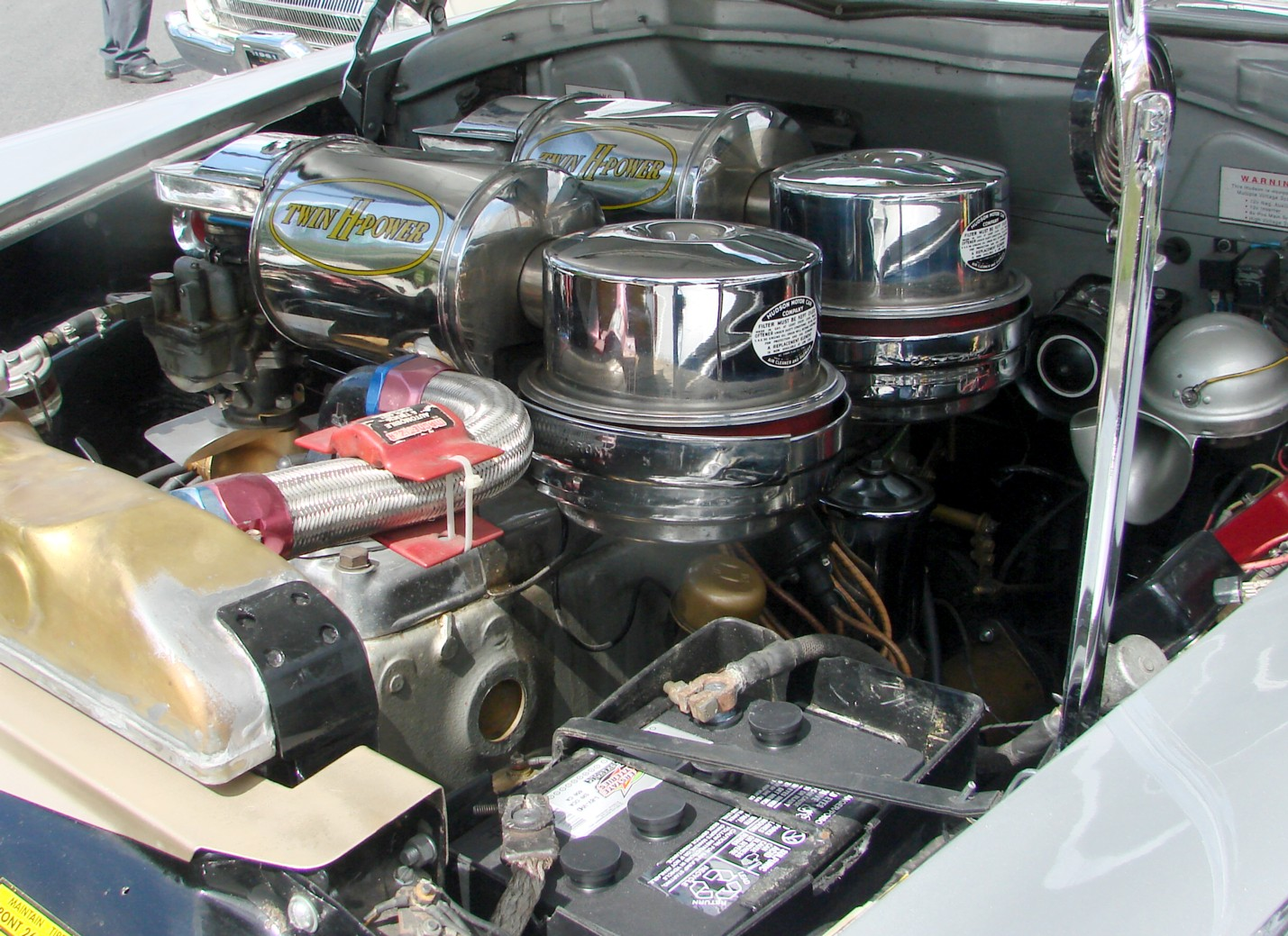
Hudson Hornet engine bay.

During the early days of stock car racing, more horsepower ultimately meant more wins. The sleek and aerodynamic Hudson Hornet managed to win in 1951, 1952, and 1953, using a 308 cu in (5.0 L) flat-head inline six-cylinder engine.

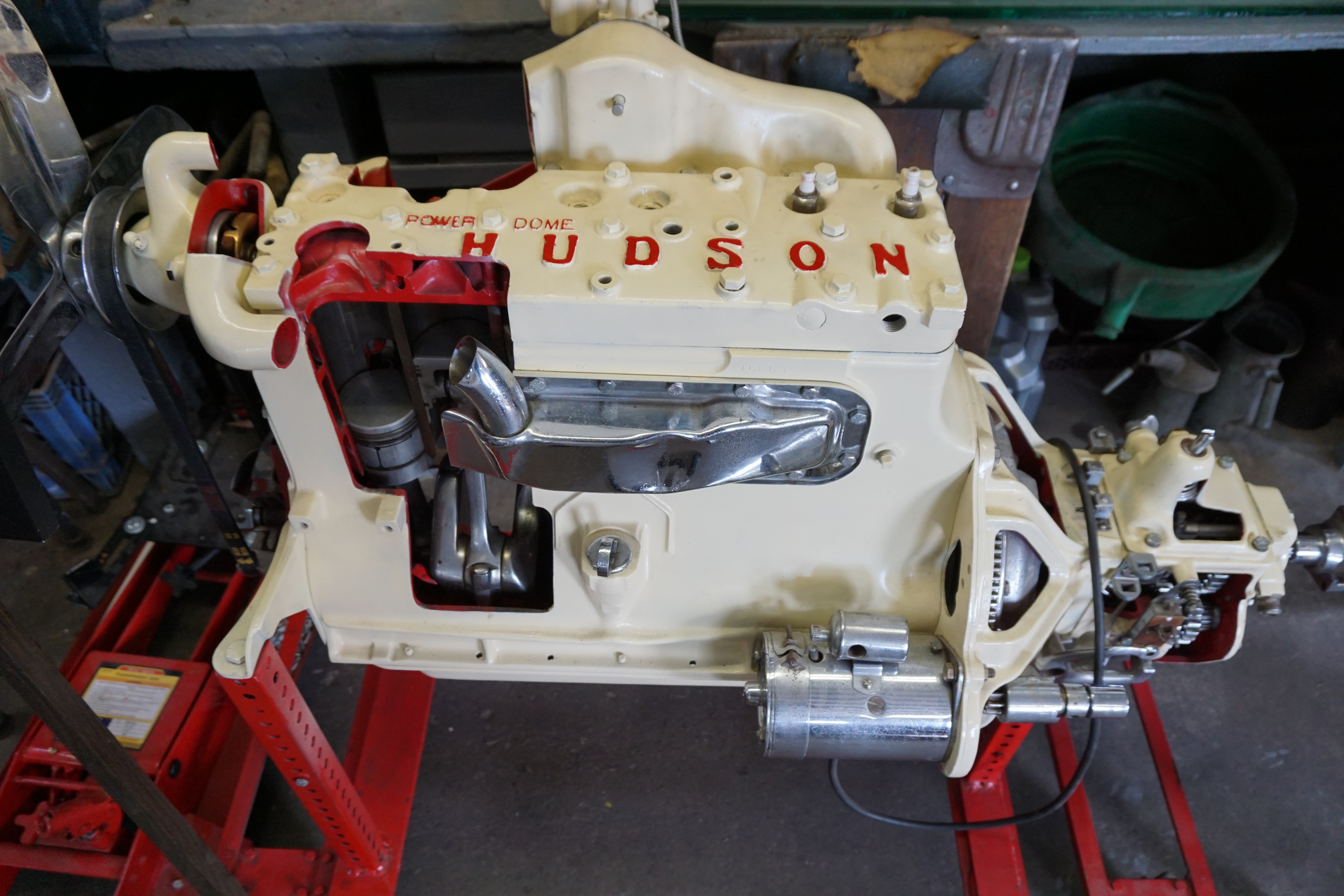
1952 Hudson Hornet stock car engine.

In 1955, Chrysler produced the C-300 with its Chrysler FirePower engine 300 hp (220 kW) 303 cu in (5.0 L) OHV engine, which easily won in 1955 and 1956.

In 1957, Chevrolet sold enough of their new fuel injected engines to the public in order to make them available for racing (and Ford began selling superchargers as an option), but Bill France immediately banned fuel injection and superchargers from NASCAR before they could race. However, even without official factory support or the use of fuel injection, Buck Baker won in 1957 driving a small-block V-8 Chevrolet Bel Air.

In 1961, Ford introduced the "FE" (Ford-Edsel) 390 in a low drag Galaxie "Starliner", but 1960 and '61 championships were won by drivers in 409-powered Chevrolet Impalas.

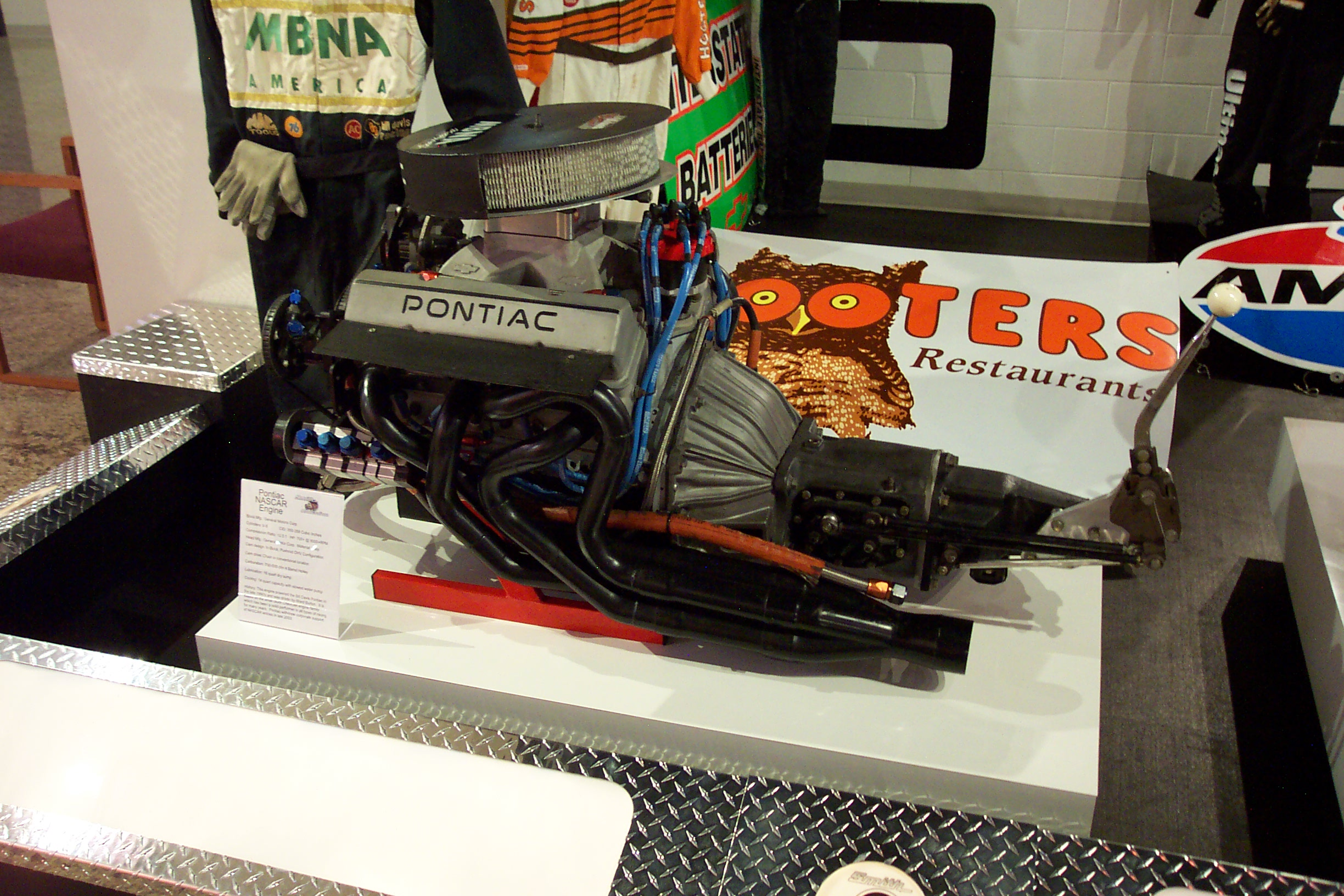
Pontiac NASCAR V-8

Pontiac introduced their "Super Duty" 421 in Catalinas that made use of many aluminum body parts to save weight, and the Pontiacs easily won in 1962.

It became apparent that manufacturers were willing to produce increasingly larger engines to remain competitive (Ford had developed a 483 they hoped to race). For the 1963 season NASCAR engines were restricted to using a maximum displacement of 427 cu in (7.0 L), and using only two valves per cylinder.

Then, in 1964 the new Chrysler 426 Hemi engine so dominated the series in a Plymouth Belvedere "Sport Fury", the homologation rules were changed so that 1,000 of any engine and car had to be sold to the public to qualify as a stock part, instead of just 500. This made the 426 Hemi unavailable for the 1965 season.

In 1965 Ford adapted two single-overhead-cams to their FE 427 V8 to allow it to run at a higher RPM (called the Ford 427 Cammer). Ford started to sell "cammers" to the public to homologate it (mostly to dealer-sponsored privateer drag racers), but NASCAR changed the rules to specify that all NASCAR engines must use a single cam-in-block. But even without the cammer, the Ford FE 427 won in 1965. This engine powered the early-to-mid-1960s Ford Galaxie, and produced 616 hp (459 kW) at 7000 rpm, and 515 lb⋅ft (698 N⋅m) at 3800 rpm, using a standard single four-barrel carburetor, and over 657 hp (490 kW) using a double four-barrel carburetor.

In the 1980s, NASCAR Xfinity Series competitors began looking at alternatives to the 311-cubic-inch (5.1 L) engines, as in short track racing there was a push for six-cylinder engines to save on costs, with some series allowing weight breaks. One popular idea was to use 231–275 cu in (3.8–4.5 L) V-6 engines instead of the Cup Series' 358 cu in (5.9 L) V-8s.

In 1989, NASCAR changed rules requiring cars to use current body styles, similar to the Cup cars. However, the cars still used V6 engines. The cars gradually became similar to Cup cars.

1994 was the final year that V6 engines were used in the Busch Series, as many short track series had abandoned six-cylinder engines.

In 1995, changes were made. The series switched to V-8 power, with a compression ratio of 9:1 (as opposed to 14:1 for Cup at the time). The introduction of V-8s, made the two series' cars increasingly similar.

The cars are currently powered by EFI V8 engines, since 2012, after 62 years using carburetion as engine fuel feed with compacted graphite iron blocks and pushrod valvetrains actuating two valves per cylinder, and are limited to a 358-cubic-inch (5.9 L) displacement. The 2011 Sprint Cup season was the last complete Cup season with carbureted engines; at the end of the 2011 season, NASCAR announced that it would change to an electronic fuel injection system for the 2012 racing season. NXS cars do, however, continue to use carburetors. However, modern technology has allowed power outputs near 900 horsepower (670 kW) in unrestricted form while retaining the conventional basic engine design. In fact, before NASCAR instituted the gear rule, Cup engines were capable of operating more than 10,000 rpm, and producing near 1,000 horsepower (750 kW). A NASCAR Cup Series engine with the maximum bore of 4.185 inches (106 millimeters) and stroke of 3.25 inches (83 millimeters) at 9,000 rpm has a mean piston speed of 80.44 fps (24.75 m/s). Contemporary Cup engines run 9,800 rpm, 87.59 fps (26.95 m/s), at the road course events, on Pocono Raceway's long front stretch, and at Martinsville Speedway (a 0.526-mile short-track). At the backbone 1.5- to 2.0-mile tri-oval tracks of NASCAR, the engines produce over 850 hp running 9,200–9,400 rpm for 500 miles, 600 mi for the Coca-Cola 600 Charlotte race. The current NASCAR Cup engines curb weight is roughly at 575 lb (261 kg).

For the 2015 NASCAR Cup Series, power output of the competing cars ranged from 750 to 800 hp (560 to 600 kW).

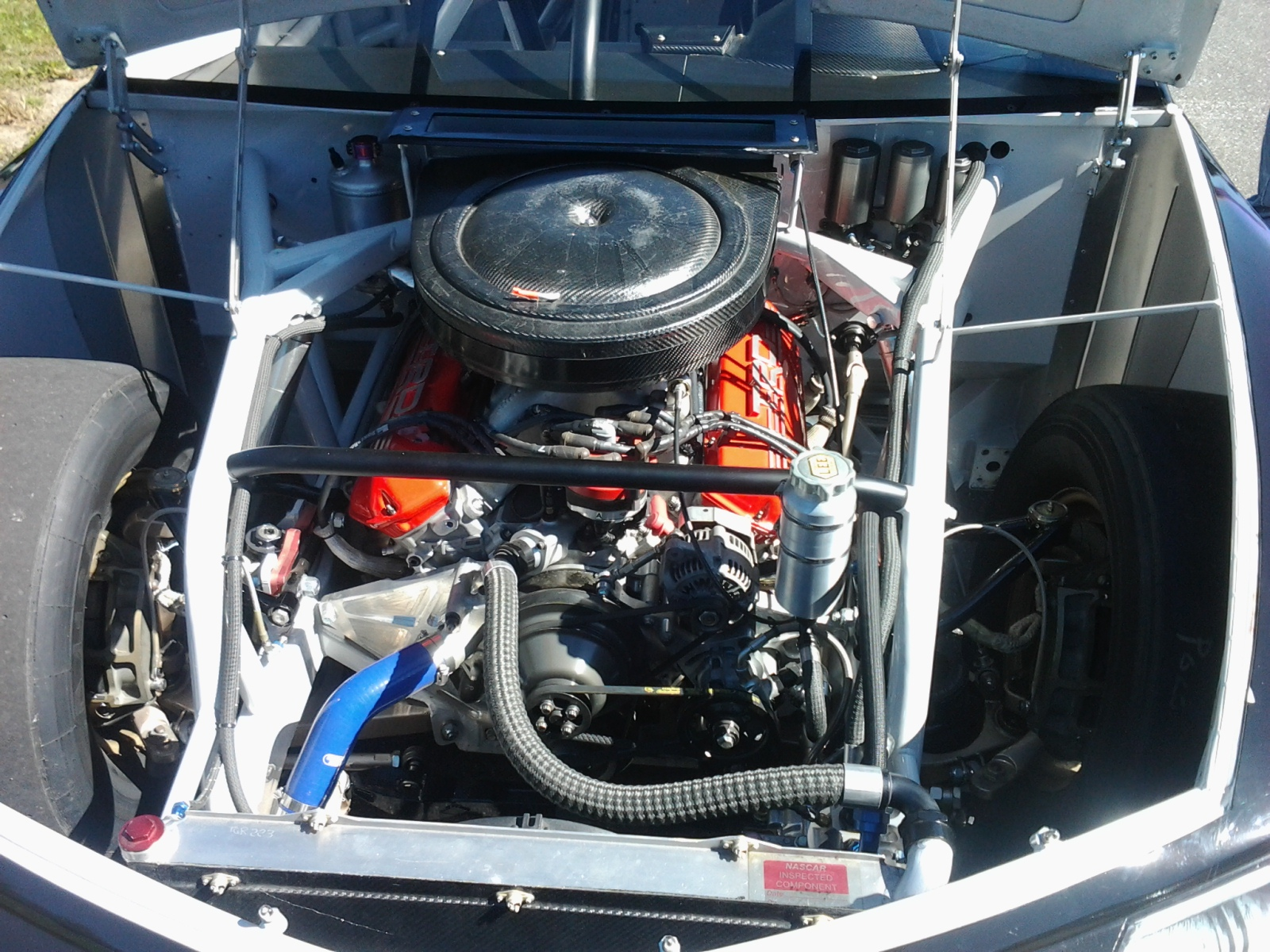
Denny Hamlin's Toyota NASCAR engine.

The engines used in the final iteration of the Generation 6 cars were limited to 750 hp (559 kW) on tracks 1 mile or below; 550 hp (410 kW) on tracks greater than one mile (2019–21).

Modern contemporary NASCAR engines are capable of producing well over 2 hp/cu. in. (up to 2.5 hp/cu. in.).

Currently, Next Gen NASCAR engines are rated at 750 hp (559 kW) for road courses, short tracks, and intermediate ovals less than 1.5 miles, 670 hp (500 kW) intermediate ovals 1.5 miles or bigger, and 510 hp (380 kW) for restrictor plate racing.

NASCAR will test a hybrid powertrain at the 2023 24 Heures du Mans in the Next Gen car with a smaller engine, per request of the Automobile Club de l'Ouest with a potential of a formula change in 2024.

=== NASCAR Whelen Modified Tour ===
NASCAR Whelen Modified Tour series stock cars are powered by small-block V-8 engines, usually of 355 to 368 cu in (5.8 to 6.0 L) of displacement, although larger or smaller engines can be used. Engine components are largely similar to those used in the Cup Series, but Whelen Modified Tour engines use a small four-barrel carburetor (rated at 390 cu ft [11 m^{3}] per minute, about half the airflow of previous modified carburetors), which limits their output to 625 to 700 hp (466 to 522 kW). On large tracks such as New Hampshire Motor Speedway, the engines must have a restrictor plate between the carburetor and intake manifold, reducing engine power and car speed for safety reasons.

== Restrictor Plates ==
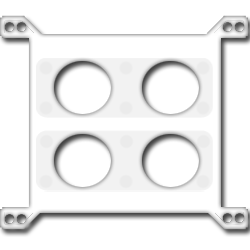
Artist rendering of a NASCAR restrictor plate

As a safety measure to reduce speeds at the two high-banked superspeedways (Daytona and Talladega), restrictor plates are used. There are some tracks, however, where restrictor plates are not mandated and therefore see faster speeds—specifically Atlanta Motor Speedway and Texas Motor Speedway. While Atlanta is generally considered the fastest track, restrictor plates are not mandated there. In 2004 and 2005, higher qualifying speeds were posted at Texas, earning it the title of the circuit's fastest track. Unrestricted, Sprint Cup cars produce over 750 horsepower (560 kW) and can run at speeds in excess of 200 mph. Rusty Wallace completed a 2004 test for NASCAR at Talladega in which he used an unrestricted motor to complete average lap speeds of 221 mph (356 km/h) and top speeds near 230 mph (370 km/h). The 2010 width is 63/64-inch. This is the largest carburetor restrictor plate opening since the one-inch mandate in 1988, the first year the horsepower-reducing plates were used in the Cup Series at Daytona.

Unfortunately, the restrictor plates have an unintended effect on the race. Because of the reduced horsepower of the cars, the cars form large packs. During a race, it is not uncommon to see thirty or more lead changes during a race. This also is the source of the Big One. When a driver crashes, usually, they take that pack with them. During the 2010 Coke Zero 400, 21 of the 43 cars crashed. This is a safety concern that has puzzled NASCAR. However, an unexpected consequence of the introduction of the Car of Tomorrow and re-paving of Daytona and Talladega track surfaces has been the separation of the pack into two-car pairs.

Since the 2012 season, NASCAR Cup cars now have fuel injection instead of carburetors, but restrictor plates are still being used.

Beginning in 1971, NASCAR rewrote the rules to effectively force the Ford and Chrysler specialty cars out of the competition by limiting them to 305c.i. (5.0L). The cars affected by this rule include the Ford Talladega, Mercury Spoiler II, Dodge Charger 500, Dodge Charger Daytona and the Plymouth Superbird. This rule was so effective in limiting performance that only one car that season ever attempted to run in this configuration.

In 1971, NASCAR handicapped the larger engines with a restrictor plate. By 1972, NASCAR phased in a rule to lower the maximum engine displacement from 429 cubic inches (7.0 L) to its present 358 cubic inches (5.9 L). The transition was not complete until 1974 and coincided with American manufacturers ending factory support of racing and the 1973 oil crisis.

After a series of flips and dangerous crashes in the 1980s, NASCAR began requiring all cars to run a restrictor plate at Daytona and Talladega. The restrictor plate limits air into the engine, reducing horsepower and speed at these tracks from 230-240 mph to 195-200 mph. At these races, in addition to the restrictor plate, there are a variety of other technical rules and regulations to keep the cars stable and on the track. In addition to these technical rules, restrictor-plate races and road courses are the only races where NASCAR enforces track limits. At the high-speed superspeedways, track limits are marked by a double yellow line separating the apron from the racing surface. Exceeding track limits to advance one's position is subject to a drive-through penalty, or if the foul occurs on the last lap that car will be relegated to the last car on the lead lap in official race results. The superspeedway track limits (often referred as the "yellow line rule") have been part of considerable criticism and controversies, such as when Regan Smith was stripped of second-place finish at the 2008 AMP Energy 500 following a last-lap pass attempt that went below the line and controversies surrounding the finish of the 2020 YellaWood 500, with former drivers turned television coverage pundits Dale Jarrett and Dale Earnhardt Jr. (the latter being involved in a track limits controversy at the 2003 Aaron's 499) calling for the repeal of the rule. If track limits are violated on road courses (such as not making a chicane, enforced at Watkins Glen, Daytona, and Charlotte road courses), drivers must stop at an assigned point of the circuit or face a drive-through penalty.

The NASCAR Cup Series and Xfinity Series mandated the use of restrictor plates at Daytona International Speedway and Talladega Superspeedway from 1988 to 2019. The plates were put into use in 1988 as a result of a wreck in the 1987 Winston 500 at Talladega that involved the car of Bobby Allison crashing into the front stretch catch fence at a high enough speed to destroy almost 100 feet of the fence and put the race under a red flag condition for two hours. The following race at Talladega that year would be run with a smaller carburetor, however, NASCAR mandated the use of the restrictor plate at the end of the season.

The restrictions are in the interest of driver and fan safety because speeds higher than the 190 mph range used for Daytona and Talladega risk cars turning over through sheer aerodynamic forces alone. The severity of crashes at higher speeds is also much greater, shown by telemetry readings of wrecks such as Elliott Sadler at Pocono Raceway and Michael McDowell at Texas Motor Speedway that were far higher than registered on restrictor-plate tracks. Drivers such as Rusty Wallace have cited data showing that the roof flaps used on the cars cannot keep them on the ground above 204 MPH.

The drawback to the use of the restrictor plates has been the increased size of packs of cars caused by the decreased power coupled with the drag the vehicles naturally produce. At Daytona and Talladega, most races are marred by at least one wreck, usually referred to as "the Big One", as cars rarely become separated. Talladega has been considered the more likely track for these instances to occur as the track is incredibly wide, enough to have three to four distinct lines of cars running side by side. With the new pavement at Daytona, three-wide racing became far easier, and multi-car wrecks became more common. The 2011 Daytona 500 saw a record number of cautions including an early 17-car pile-up. These wrecks tend to be singled out for criticism despite multicar crashes at other tracks and the generally greater severity of impact on non-restricted tracks. In addition, the packs were far smaller in 1988 through 1990 until more teams mastered the nuances of this kind of racing and improved their cars (and drivers) accordingly.

The 2011 Sprint Cup season was the last complete Cup season with carbureted engines; at the end of the 2011 season, NASCAR announced that it would change to an electronic fuel injection system for the 2012 racing season. The injection system used by NASCAR is a different system from that used in IndyCar Racing and other motorsports series; the EFI system that NASCAR put into use was compatible with the old restrictor plates, allowing NASCAR to continue to use them to keep the speeds lower at the superspeedways and save costs for race teams. The restrictor plates were bolted beneath a throttle body that sits in the same place as the former carburetors.

Tapered spacers have been used in NASCAR's Cup Series since 2015, when a 1.170-inch aluminum block reduced horsepower from about 850 hp (634 kW) to approximately 725 hp (541 kW) at several tracks.

The 2019 rules package mandates those same-sized spacers at all tracks less than 1.33 miles. A 0.922-inch spacer will be used at all oval tracks 1.33 miles and above, which will decrease engine horsepower to about 550.

The last race with the original restrictor plates was the 2019 Daytona 500; after that race, the cars moved to a variable-sized tapered spacer already used at all other tracks, with the exception that the spacer would have smaller holes than the ones used at the smaller tracks, to ensure speeds stay under 200 MPH. The shape of the spacer helps a car funnel more air smoothly into the manifold, increasing fuel performance, while ensuring airflow is still restricted. With that change, NASCAR also mandated the use of larger rear spoilers, larger front splitters, and specially-placed front-end aero ducts. The combination of those features increased drag on the cars, counteracting the increased horsepower, keeping the cars close to the speeds they were running prior to the switch to the tapered spacer. While the racing quality noticeably improved, and passing was made easier with larger horsepower and bigger runs, speeds also noticeably increased past 200 MPH, and even into 205 MPH ranges.

=== Reason for restrictor plates ===
There have been four eras that NASCAR used restrictor plates.

The first use came in 1970 as part of a transition from the seven-liter era (427 cubic-inch) to the six-liter era (358 cubic-inch) engine. Following testing and input from drivers such as David Pearson, Bobby Isaac, and Bobby Allison, NASCAR mandated the use of a restrictor plate for the big-block seven-liter engines. Small-block engines, in the 358 cubic inch range, were exempt from the plates; the first car to race with a small-block engine was Dick Brooks at the 1971 Daytona 500, where he ran a 1969 Dodge Charger Daytona with a 305 CID engine. The transition period lasted until 1974, when the current 358 cubic-inch (5870cc) limit was imposed and NASCAR eliminated the 427 cubic-inch (7000cc) engine. As the early 1970s use of restrictor plates was considered a transitional process, and as not every car used restrictor plates, this is not what most fans call "restrictor plate racing".

The second use came following the crash of Bobby Allison at the 1987 Winston 500 at Talladega Superspeedway. Allison's Buick LeSabre blew a tire going into the tri-oval at 200 mph (320 km/h), spun around and became airborne, flying tail-first into the catch fencing. While the car did not enter the grandstands it tore down nearly 100 feet of fencing and flying debris injured several spectators. After a summer where the two subsequent superspeedway races were run with smaller carburetors (390 cubic feet per minute (cfm) instead of 830 cfm) proved to be inadequate to sufficiently slow the cars, NASCAR imposed restrictor plates again, this time at the two fastest circuits, both superspeedways: Daytona for all NASCAR-sanctioned races and Talladega for Cup races. The Automobile Racing Club of America also enforced restrictor plates at their events at the two tracks. In 1992, when the Busch Grand National series began racing at Talladega, the plates were implemented, in keeping with their use at Daytona.

NASCAR's concerns with speeds because of power-to-weight ratios result in restrictor plates at other tracks. The Goody's Dash Series (known now as the ISCARS series with its new ownership) used restrictor plates at Bristol during at least the last years of the series' existence when the cars were using six-cylinder engines (compared to the traditional four-cylinder engines), in addition to their Daytona races.

However, restrictor plates were not initially used for Camping World Truck Series trucks. Rather, aerodynamic air intake reduction through the use of a 390 cfm carburetor, and eventually a tapered carburetor spacer was implemented for those races. Combined with the aerodynamic disadvantage of the trucks, this allowed NASCAR to avoid the use of such equipment for the trucks until 2008. In 2008, the Nationwide Series (now known as Xfinity Series) and Truck Series began implementation of tapered spacers in the engines to restrict power compared to Sprint Cup cars at all 35 (NNS) and 25 (NCTS) races. Both these NASCAR series now use a restrictor plate and tapered spacer at the two tracks.

The third use came in 2000. Following fatal crashes of Adam Petty and Kenny Irwin Jr. at the New Hampshire International Speedway during the May Busch Series and July Winston Cup Series races, respectively, NASCAR adopted a one-inch (2.54 cm) restrictor plate to slow the cars headed towards the tight turns as part of a series of reforms to alleviate stuck throttle problems which were alleged to have caused both fatal crashes. For the Winston Cup race, it was used just once at the 2000 Dura Lube 300. Jeff Burton led all 300 laps in the ensuing race, despite a 23-car two-abreast battle in the first ten laps, a dramatic charge past 22 cars in 100 laps by John Andretti (who finished seventh), and two charges by Bobby Labonte in the final 50 laps where he took the lead but Burton beat him back to the stripe. The use of restrictor plates, intended as an emergency measure pending a more permanent replacement, in any event, was discontinued at New Hampshire for the following race for Cup only. However, the Modifieds still use a restrictor plate because the speeds are too great for that class of racecar without them. The track has since been changed with SAFER Barriers to improve racing safety. Restrictor plates remain a permanent fixture on the Modifieds and the racing has often broken 20 official lead changes for 100–125 laps of competition.

Rusty Wallace tested a car at Talladega Superspeedway without a restrictor plate in 2004, reaching a top speed of 240 mph (390 km/h) in the backstretch and a one-lap average of 221 mph (356 km/h). While admitting excitement at the achievement, Wallace also conceded, "There's no way we could be out there racing at those speeds... it would be insane to think we could have a pack of cars out there doing that."

In 2016, following a series of uncompetitive races at Indianapolis Motor Speedway, NASCAR began a series of tests for the Xfinity Series using a smaller restrictor plate than used at Daytona and Talladega and aerodynamic aids. After the tests were successful, the rules package was imposed for the 2017 race at Indianapolis. For 2018, the package is being used at Indianapolis, Michigan, and Pocono for the Xfinity Series and in the All-Star Race in the Cup Series.

=== The competitive quality of restrictor plate racing ===
A frequent criticism of restrictor plates is the enormous size of packs in the racing, with "Big One" wrecks as noted above singled out for condemnation despite the greater violence of "smaller" crashes on unrestricted tracks. In restrictor plate racing the packs have brought about an often-enormous increase in positional passing; at Talladega Superspeedway the Sprint Cup cars have broken 40 official lead changes sixteen times from 1988 onward, including both 2010 Sprint Cup races at Talladega, which had 87 official lead changes in the regulation 188 laps. (The 2010 Aaron's 499 had 88 lead changes, but the 88th – the race-winning pass by Kevin Harvick – was on the last lap of the third attempt at a green–white–checkered finish). Daytona International Speedway has generally been less competitive because the age of the asphalt (the track was repaved in 1978 and again in 2010) has reduced grip for the cars and thus handling has impeded passing ability to a significant extent. The 2000 New Hampshire race was condemned because Jeff Burton led wire to wire; the plates were singled out as impeding the ability to pass, a criticism contradicted by the use of restrictor plates in a Busch North support race the day before where the lead changed seven times in 100 laps and by the highly competitive nature of restrictor plated Modified races; as noted above the 300 also saw a 23-car battle for third in the first ten laps and a burst by 22 cars from John Andretti.

The criticism stems from the reduction in throttle response brought by the restriction. The reduction in throttle response, however, has never been shown to have impeded the ability to pass; the criticism was shot down in the first "modern" plate race, the 1988 Daytona 500, as the lead changed 25 times officially and saw several bursts where the lead changed several times a lap and also several bursts of sustained side-by-side racing, notably in the final 50 laps between Bobby Allison, Darrell Waltrip, Neil Bonnett, and Buddy Baker.

Said Waltrip before the race, "I feel, as a driver, now I can do more than I could before (the plates). Now, instead of a car just blasting by me with a burst of speed and a lot of horsepower, he's got to think his way, he got to drive his way around me."

In the transitional years (1971–74) where the seven-liter engines (427 cu in) had restrictor plates, Daytona and Talladega broke 40 official lead changes six times, while Michigan International Speedway broke 35 official lead changes in both of its 1971 races.

=== Specifications (NASCAR Cup Series - Gen 7) ===
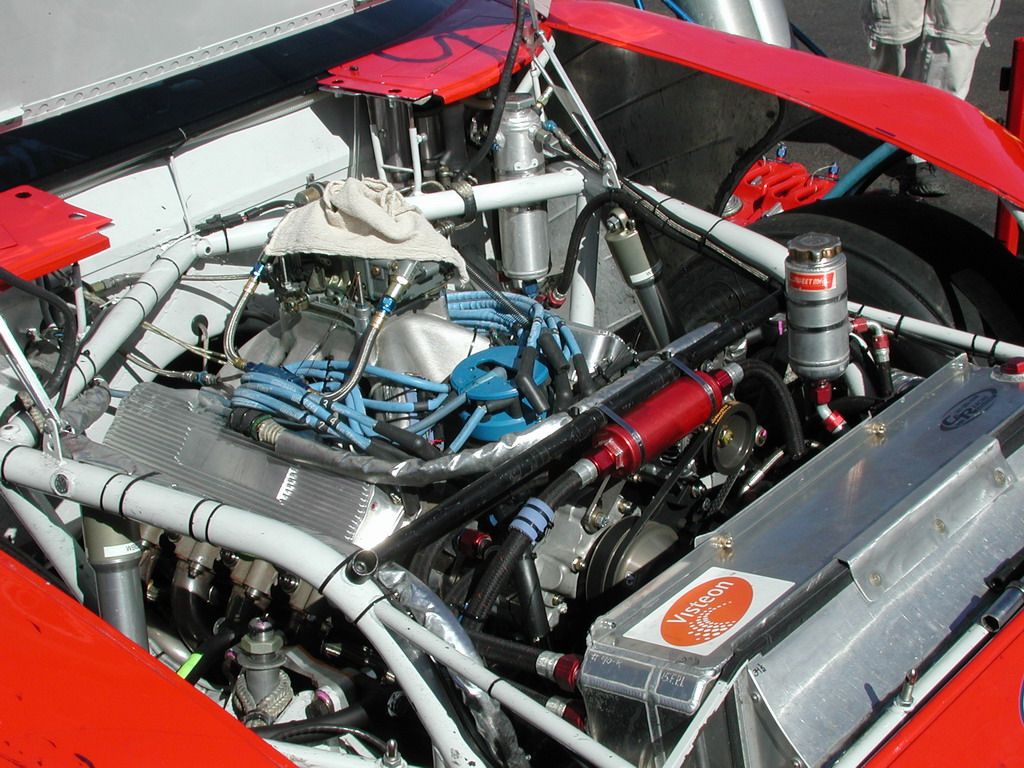
A typical NASCAR Cup Series engine.

- Engine displacement/configuration: 90° 5.86 L (358 cu in) pushrod (OHV) V8
- Power output: 750 hp (559 kW) on oval tracks less than 1.5 miles & road courses; 670 hp (500 kW) on oval tracks 1.5 miles or bigger (that are not considered superspeedways); 465 hp (347 kW) on Superspeedways (Daytona, Talladega, and EchoPark Speedway - since 2022)
- Torque: 680–730 N⋅m (500–540 ft⋅lb)
- Compression ratio: 12:1
- Aspiration: Naturally-aspirated
- Fuel: Sunoco 93 MON, 104 RON, 98 AKI 85% unleaded gasoline + Sunoco Green Ethanol E15 15%
- Fuel capacity: 20 US gallons (76 litres) most tracks
- Fuel delivery: Electronic fuel injection
- Fuel injection type: McLaren Electronic Systems
- ECU provider: McLaren Freescale TAG-400N
- Builders:
  - Chevrolet: ECR Engines, Hendrick Motorsports
  - Ford: Roush-Yates Engines
  - Toyota: Toyota Racing Development

=== Specifications (NASCAR O'Reilly Auto Parts Series) ===
- Engine displacement: 5,860 cc (358 cu in) Pushrod V8
- Power output: 650–700 hp (480–520 kW) unrestricted, ≈450 hp (340 kW) restricted
- Torque: 700 N⋅m (520 ft⋅lb)
- Fuel: 90 MON, 98 RON, 94 AKI unleaded gasoline provided by Sunoco 85% + Sunoco Green Ethanol E15
- Fuel capacity: 18 US gallons (68 litres)
- Fuel delivery: Carburetion
- Compression ratio: 12:1
- Aspiration: Naturally aspirated
- Carburetor size: 390 ft^{3}/min (184 L/s); 4-barrel

=== Specifications (NASCAR Craftsman Truck Series) ===
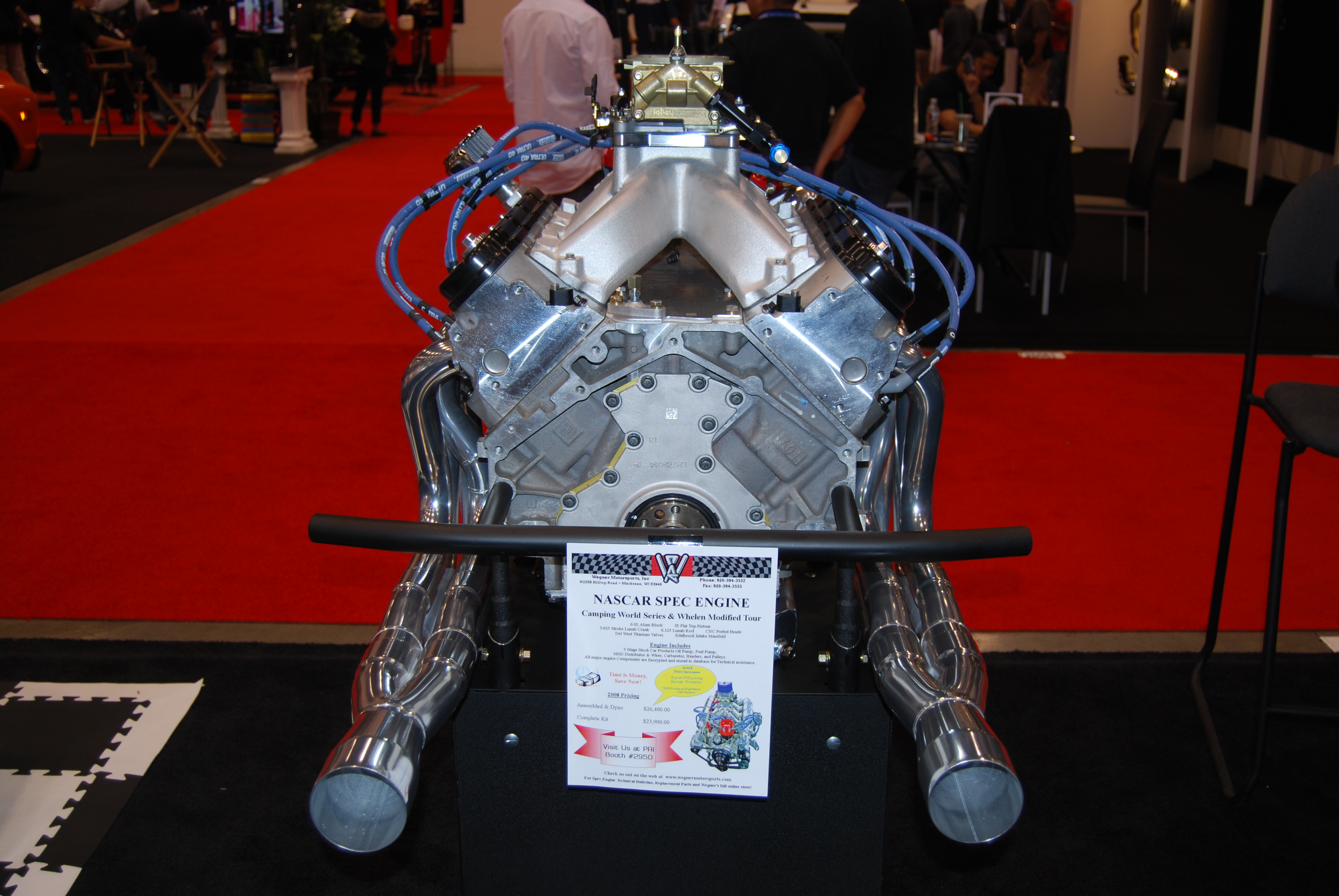
NASCAR-spec Camping World Truck Series and Whelen Modified Tour V-8 engine.

- Engine displacement: 5,860 cc (358 cu in) built OR 6,490 cc (396 cu in) optional series-spec Pushrod V8
- Power output: 650–700 hp (480–520 kW) unrestricted, ≈450 hp (340 kW) restricted
- Torque: 700 N⋅m (520 ft⋅lb)
- Fuel: Sunoco 93 MON, 104 RON, 98 AKI 85% unleaded gasoline + Sunoco Green Ethanol E15 15%
- Fuel capacity: 18 US gallons (68 litres)
- Fuel delivery: Carburetion (built) or throttle-body injection (optional series-spec)
- Compression ratio: 12:1 (built) or 10.5:1 (optional series-spec)
- Aspiration: Naturally aspirated
- Carburetor size: 390 ft3/min (184 L/s); 4-barrel

== Applications ==
- Generation 1
- Generation 2
- Generation 3
- Generation 4
- Generation 5 (Car of Tomorrow)
- Generation 6
- Generation 7 (Next Gen)
