= Ford Racing =

Motorsports division of Ford Motor Company

- Type: Division
- Industry: Automotive; Motorsport
- Predecessors: Ford Performance; Ford Team RS; Special Vehicle Team; Ford Performance Vehicles; Ford Performance Racing
- Founded: October 10, 1901; 125 years ago, in Grosse Pointe, Michigan, U.S.
- Founder: Henry Ford
- Headquarters: Dearborn, Michigan, United States
- Products: Performance car Supercar; Performance parts Racing parts
- Parent: Ford Motor Company
- Website: Official website

Ford Racing (formerly Ford Performance) is the high-performance division of the Ford Motor Company and the multinational name used for its motorsport and racing activity.

== History ==
- 1896 – Henry Ford reached a top speed of 20 mph in his first car, Quadricycle.
- 1901 – Henry Ford defeated Alexander Winton (the most accomplished automobile builder/racer of the era) in a 10-lap race on a one-mile oval at the Detroit Driving Club, Grosse Pointe, Michigan. He overcame his rival's more powerful car in Sweepstakes, a racing car of his own design.
- 1902 – Ford 999 (named after a famous New York Central train), driven by Barney Oldfield, Master Driver of the World and America's Legendary Speed King, defeated Alex Winton at Grosse Point in the 999 as a result of the publicity and financial backing of Alex J. Malcomson the Ford Motor Company was launched
- 1903 – Ford 999, driven by Oldfield, lapped the Indiana Fairgrounds dirt track at a then-record 60 mph?
- 1904 – Henry Ford, driving his rebuilt 999, sets the world one mile record on a frozen lake near Detroit.
- 1904 – Frank Kulick drove a Ford 20 hp racer to the one and five mile world track record for middleweight racers.
- 1907 – Kulick set the world 24-hour track endurance record, traveling 1135 miles driving a Ford six cyl Model K.
- 1909 – A Ford Model T won the transcontinental New York to Seattle cross-country race (about 3600 km).
- 1932 – Ford introduced its V-8 Flathead engine, bringing V-8 power into mass production with the slogan "Everyman’s power for the road, and Everyman’s power for racing".
- 1932 – Two car mechanics win the Swedish Winter Grand Prix driving a Ford special.
- 1936 – Ionel Zamfirescu and P. G. Cristea won the Monte Carlo Rally driving a Ford V8 "Flathead".
- 1949 – Jim Roper, driving a Lincoln, won the first NASCAR race.
- 1950 – Jimmy Florian, driving a Ford, wins the first NASCAR race in a Ford branded vehicle at Dayton Ohio
- 1963 – Tiny Lund wins 1st Daytona 500 for Ford.
- 1965 – Jim Clark gives Ford its 1st of 6 Indy wins between 1965 and 1971. source: IRL: Ford clinches first Indianapolis 500 win
- 1966 – Ford achieved its 1st of 4 wins at the 24 Hours of Le Mans between 1966 and 1969, thus becoming the first American constructor to have won a major European race since the triumph of Duesenberg at the 1921 French Grand Prix.
- 1967 – Jim Clark, driving a Lotus-Ford, won the Dutch Grand Prix. This is Ford's first grand prix victory. The victory of Ford at the 1967 24 Hours of Le Mans still remains both the only all-American victory in Le Mans history — American drivers (Dan Gurney and A. J. Foyt), team (Shelby-American Inc.), chassis constructor (Ford), engine manufacturer (Ford), and tires (Goodyear) — as well as the only victory of a car designed and built entirely (both chassis and engine) in the United States.
- 1968 – Graham Hill, driving a Lotus-Ford, won both the driver's world championship and the constructor's world championship. This is Ford's first of both respective championship wins. Ford as an engine manufacturer completed the Triple Crown of Motorsport (wins at the Indianapolis 500, 24 Hours of Le Mans, and Monaco Grand Prix) by winning the 1968 Monaco Grand Prix.
- 1976 – Ford via Cosworth won its 1st Indy 500 and would dominate Indy with the Cosworth DFX over the next 10 years by winning every race plus 2 more with the XB version for a 12 Indy win total between 1978 and 1996 The Ford-Cosworth DFX powered 81 consecutive Indy car victories from 1981 to 1986, and 153 victories total. Won all USAC and CART championships between 1977 and 1987. Source - Cosworth DFX Indy Engine
- 1994 – Michael Schumacher bags his first driver's world championship with Ford-powered Benetton B194 car.
- 2000 – Dale Jarrett wins Ford's 10th Daytona 500.
- 2003 – Giancarlo Fisichella, driving a Jordan-Ford, won the Brazilian Grand Prix. This is Ford's 176th and last Grand Prix victory until Max Verstappen's win at the 2026 Bahrain Grand Prix.
- 2011 – Trevor Bayne wins the Daytona 500 in a 1–2–3 finish for Ford. It was Ford's 600th NASCAR victory.
- 2012 – Michael Shank Racing wins the 50th Rolex 24 at Daytona with a Ford engined Riley chassis (Allmendinger/Negri/Pew/Wilson), Starworks Motorsport finishes 2nd in Grand-Am Daytona Prototype driver standings (Ryan Dalziel), and wins the 1st North American Endurance Championship, also with Ford power.
- 2013 – Greg Biffle wins the Quicken Loans 400, Ford's 1000th NASCAR win.
- 2014 – Debut of the Ford EcoBoost twin turbo engine for the TUDOR United SportsCar Championship, Chip Ganassi Racing with Felix Sabates win the Mobil 1 12 Hours of Sebring using the engine.
- 2015 – Ford launches Ford Performance, merging Ford Racing, Ford Team RS and Special Vehicle Team (SVT) under one umbrella, as it also pledges to make 12 new performance vehicles by 2020. Wins Rolex 24 Hours of Daytona overall with Chip Ganassi Racing with Felix Sabates (Kanaan / McMurray / Larson / Dixon) using Ford Ecoboost Riley DP.
- 2016 – Ford entered four Ford GT cars in the 2016 24 Hours of Le Mans GTE Pro class, finished 1–3–4–10.
- 2018 – Joey Logano wins at Homestead–Miami Speedway and wins Ford Performance its first NASCAR cup championship since 2004 and First Manufacturer's Championship since 2002.
- 2023 – Ford announced their return as a Formula 1 engine manufacturer for 2026 after nearly 20 years of absence in Formula 1 and will partner with Red Bull Powertrains as Red Bull Ford Powertrains. Red Bull Ford Powertrains will supply engines to Red Bull Racing and Racing Bulls.
- 2024 – As part of their partnership with Red Bull and the company's broader STEM and DEI initiatives to "further attract more women to the sport across all levels and roles", Ford signed a title partnership deal with Red Bull to form the Red Bull Ford Academy Programme in support of the team's F1 Academy drivers.
- 2025 – Ford Performance rebrands as Ford Racing.
- 2026 - Ford won its first Formula One race as an engine supplier for Red Bull when Max Verstappen won the 2026 Bahrain Grand Prix in Malaysia. By securing pole position for this race, Ford also became the first non-Mercedes engine to secure a pole position in the 2026 Formula One World Championship.

== Vehicles ==
This list only includes vehicles produced post 2016 after the merger of Ford Team RS and Special Vehicle Team,

=== Currently sold ===
- Ford Explorer ST
- Ford F-150 Raptor/Raptor R
- Ford Bronco Raptor
- Ford Ranger Raptor
- Ford Mustang GTD

=== Previously sold ===
- Ford Fiesta ST
- Ford Focus ST
- Ford Focus RS
- Ford Mustang Shelby GT350/GT350R
- Ford Mustang Shelby GT500
- Ford Edge ST
- Ford GT

== Factory drivers ==
=== Current ===
- (United Kingdom) Ben Barker
- (Norway) Dennis Olsen
- (India) Arjun Maini
- (Germany) Finn Wiebelhaus
- (Germany) Christopher Mies
- (United States) Joey Hand
- (United Kingdom) Tom Blomqvist
- (Australia) Matt Campbell
- (United Kingdom) Nick Yelloly
- (United Kingdom) Sebastian Priaulx
- (Germany) Mike Rockenfeller
- (United States) Logan Sargeant
- (Germany) David Schumacher
- (Belgium) Frédéric Vervisch

== Wins ==
Series	Race wins	Manufacturers titles	Drivers titles
Formula One	176	10	13
NASCAR	728	17	11
V8 Supercar	415	6	26

== Ford Racing teams ==
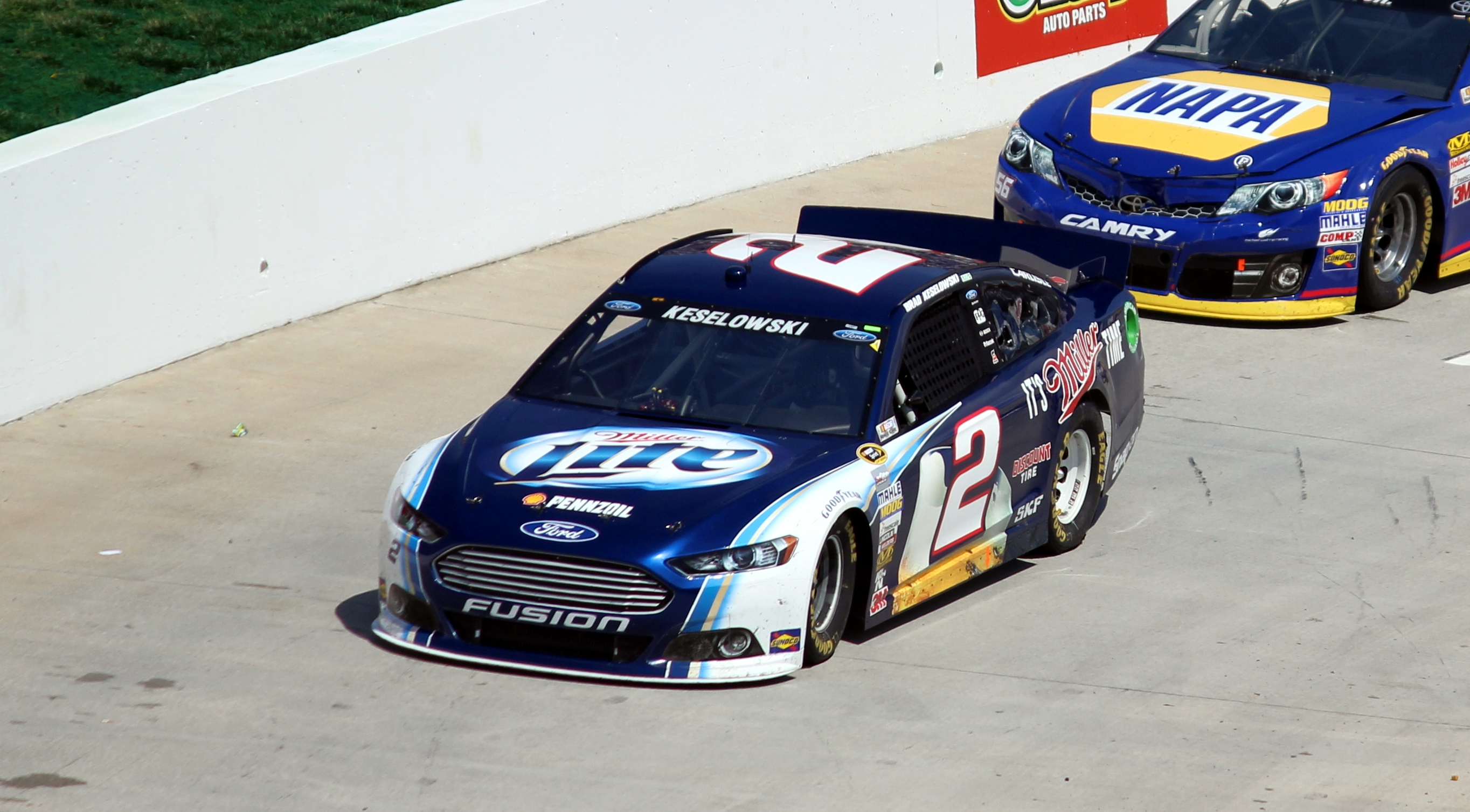
Brad Keselowski's Penske Racing car

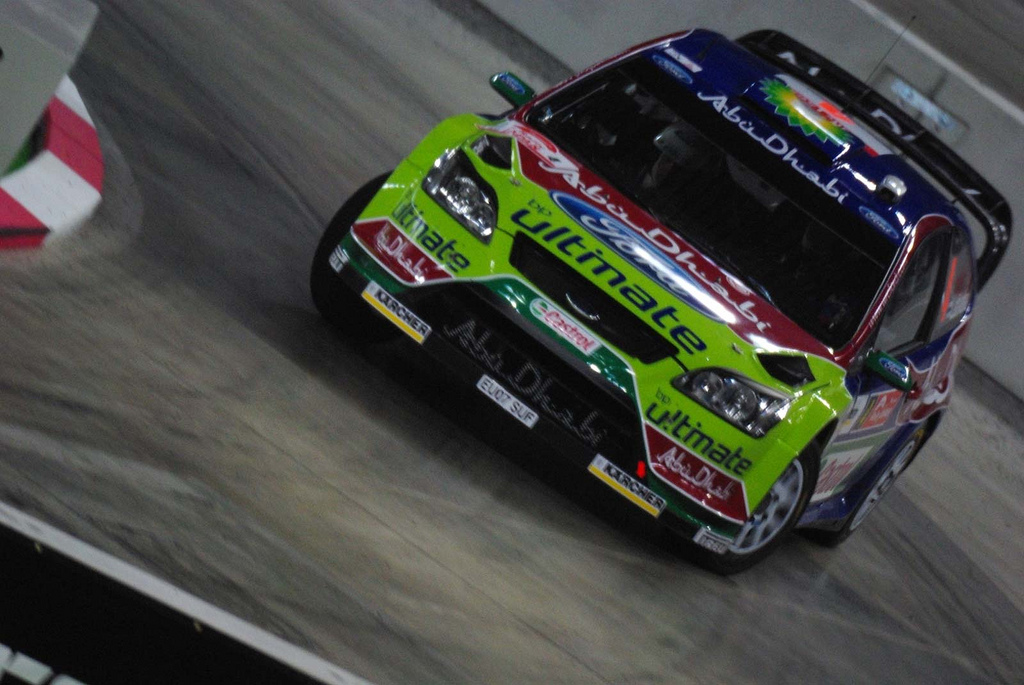
Jari-Matti Latvala's BP-Ford World Rally Team car

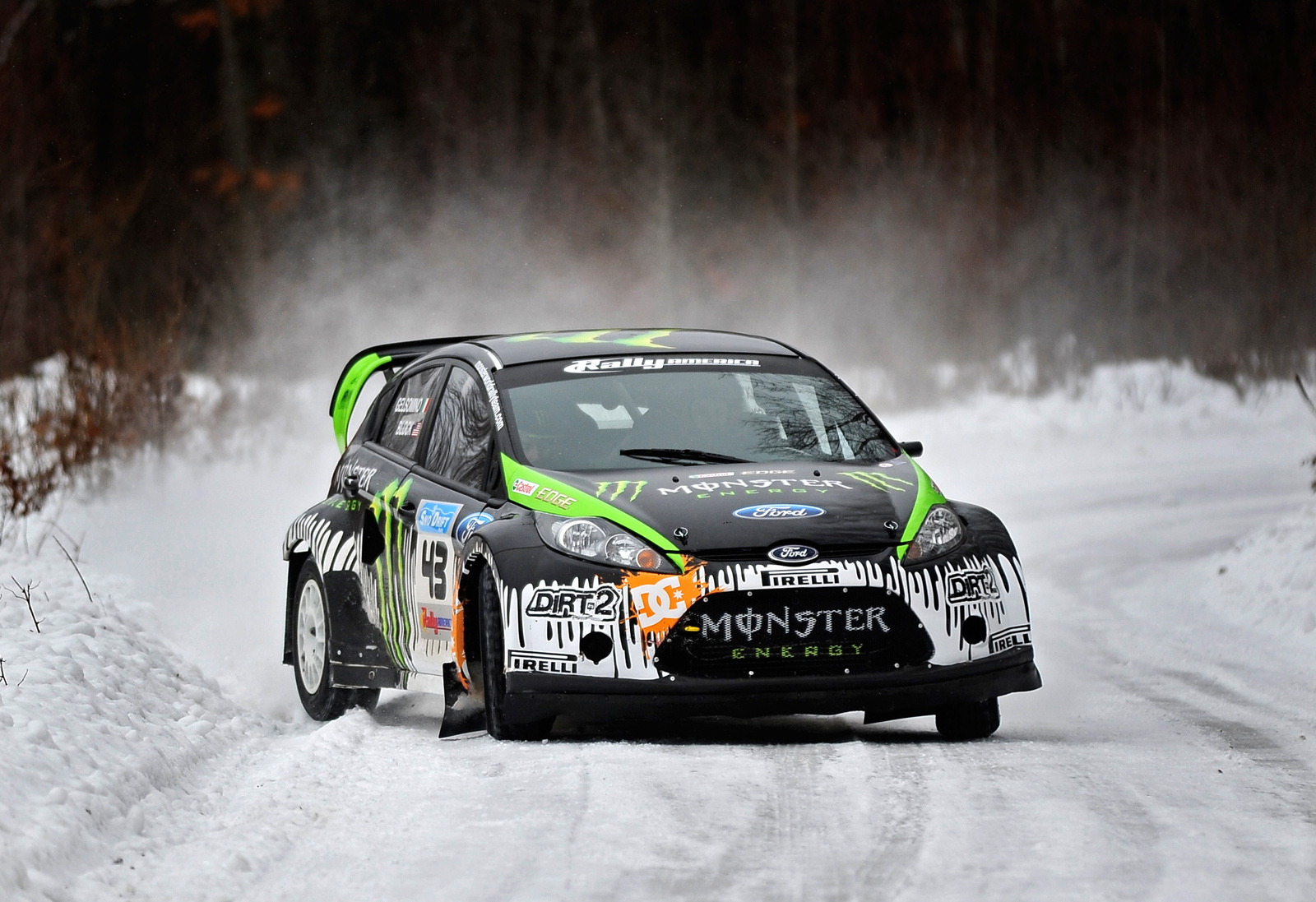
Ken Block's Monster World Rally Team Ford Fiesta in Rally America

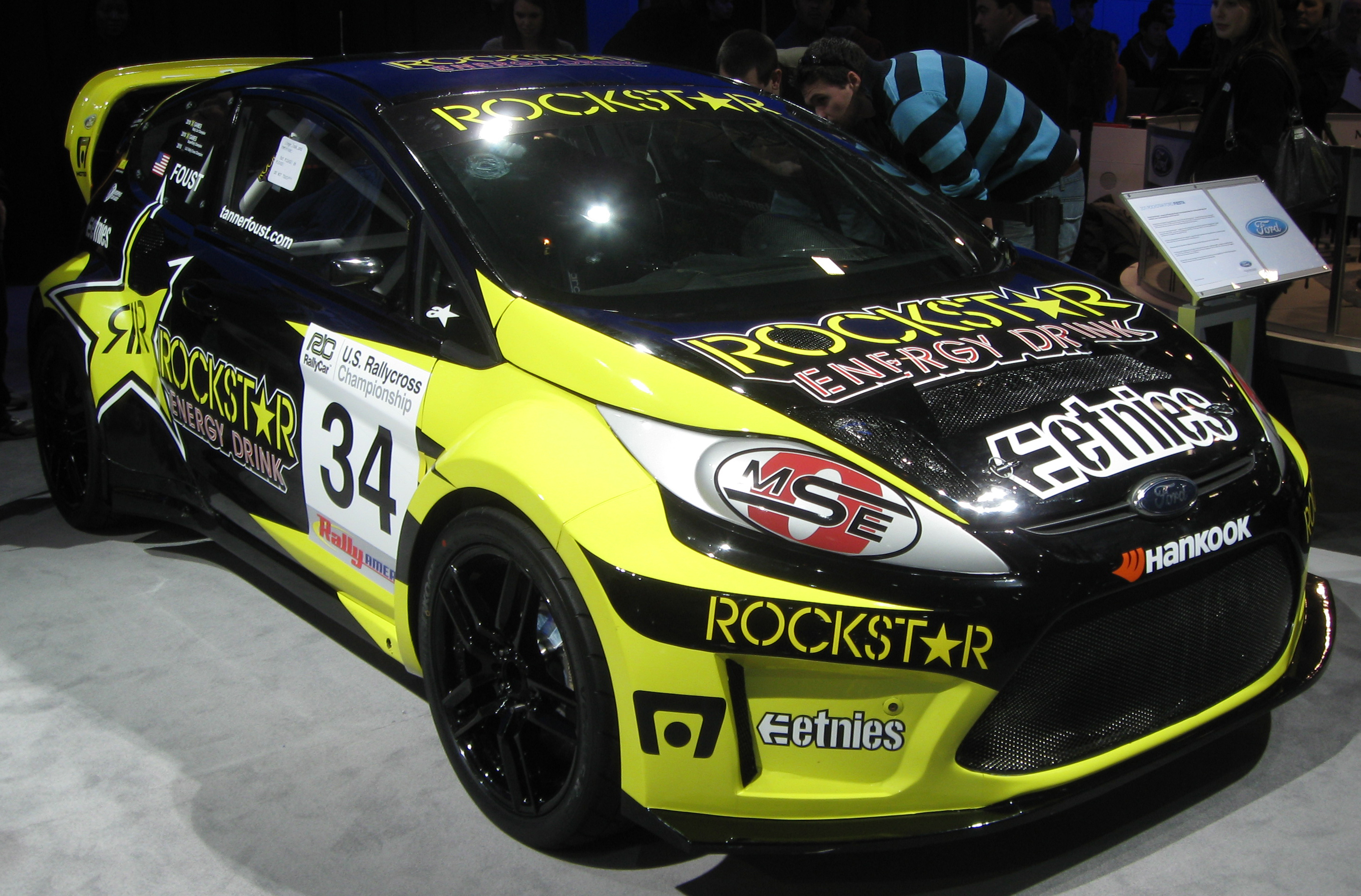
Tanner Foust's Rockstar-Etnies rallycross Ford Fiesta (AWD Division)

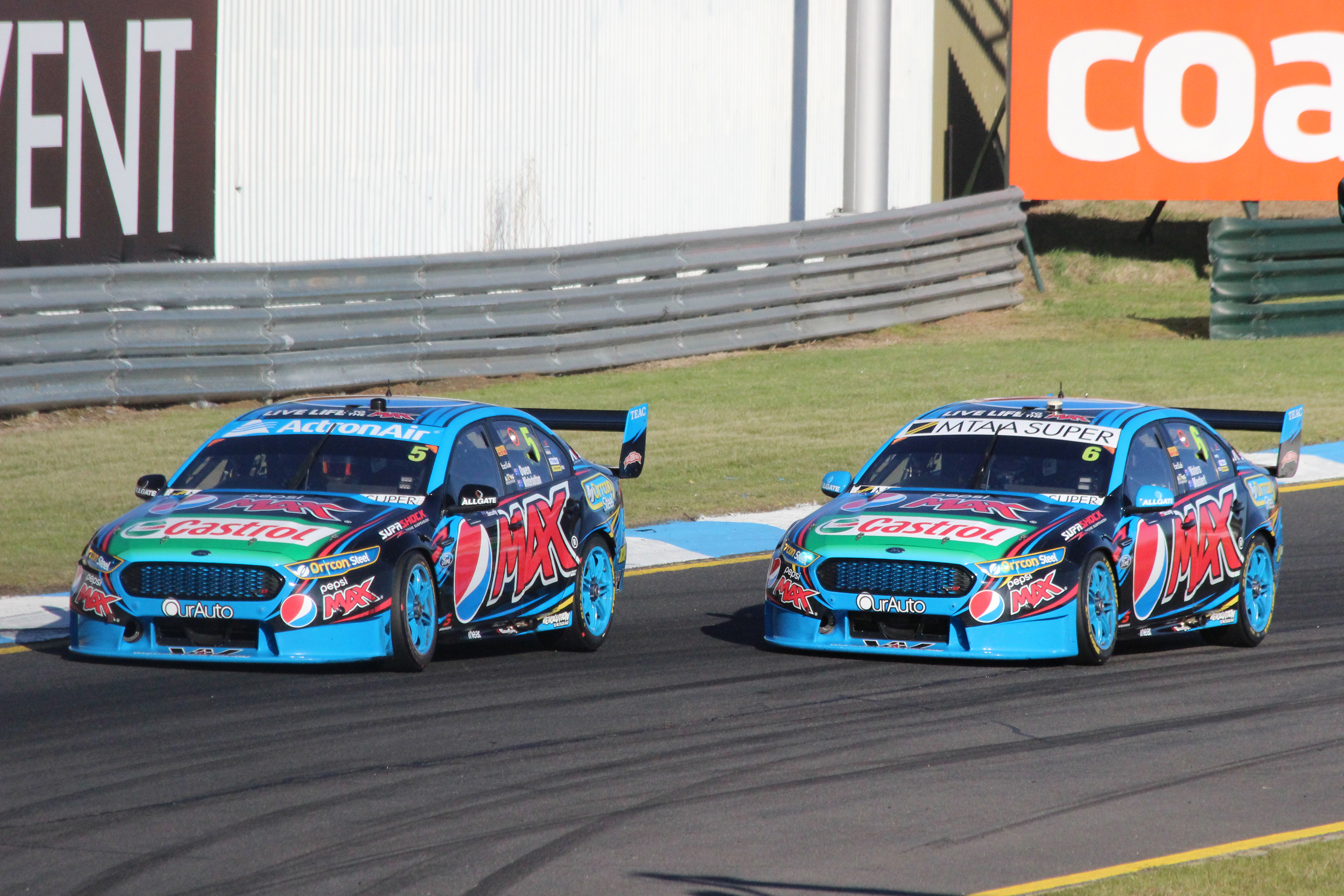
The Ford Falcons of V8 Supercars team Prodrive Racing Australia

=== Formula One ===
- Red Bull Racing (2026–)
- Visa Cash App RB (2026–)

=== NASCAR ===
==== Cup Series ====
- Wood Brothers Racing (1950–present)
- Team Penske (1994–2002, 2013–present)
- RFK Racing (1988–present)
- Front Row Motorsports (2010–present)

==== O'Reilly Auto Parts Series ====
Alpha Prime Racing (2027-present)

==== Truck Series ====
- ThorSport Racing (2018–2020, 2023–present)
- Front Row Motorsports (2020–present)
- Team Reaume (2023–present)

=== Australian Supercars Championship ===
- Blanchard Racing Team (2021–present)
- Dick Johnson Racing (1980–present)
- Grove Racing (2022–present)
- Tickford Racing (2003–present)
- Triple Eight Race Engineering (2003–2009, 2026–)

=== World Endurance Championship ===
- Proton Competition (2024–)

=== IMSA SportsCar Championship ===
- Multimatic Motorsports (2024–)

=== Past teams ===
- AK Racing
- Arrows F1 Team
- AM Racing
- Belgian Racing
- Benetton Formula
- Bill Elliott Racing
- Bud Moore Engineering
- Chip Ganassi Racing
- Fischer Racing
- Geoff Bodine Racing
- Haas Factory Team
- FWRT
- Ford World Rally Team
- Go Fas Racing
- Hoonigan Racing Division
- Hettinger Racing
- Jaguar Racing
- Jordan Grand Prix
- Live Fast Motorsports
- Marc VDS Racing Team
- Matech GT Racing
- Melling Racing
- Minardi F1 Team
- Munchi's Ford World Rally Team
- Olsbergs MSE
- Richard Petty Motorsports
- Rick Ware Racing
- RSS Racing
- Rudd Performance Motorsports
- Sauber F1 Team
- SS-Green Light Racing
- Stewart–Haas Racing
- Stewart Grand Prix
- SunTrust Racing
- Team Aon
- Walkinshaw Andretti United
- Yates Racing

== Racecars ==
Year	Car	Image	Category
1958	Ford Galaxie		NASCAR Gen 1
1959	Ford Thunderbird		NASCAR Gen 1
1965	Ford Mustang		Group C
1965	Ford Galaxie		Group C
1966	Ford Cortina Lotus		Group 2
1966	Ford GT40 Mk I		Group 4
1966	Ford GT40 Mk II		Group 6
1966	Ford Mustang		Group 2
1967	Ford GT40 Mark IV		Group 6
1967	Ford Fairlane		NASCAR Gen 2
1968	Ford Torino		NASCAR Gen 2
1968	Ford P68		Group 6
1968	Mercury Cyclone		NASCAR Gen 2
1968	Mercury Montego		NASCAR Gen 2
1969	Ford Boss 302 Mustang		Group C
1969	Ford Escort Twin Cam		Group 2
1969	Ford G7		Group 7
1969	Ford P69		Group 6
1969	Mercury Cyclone Spoiler II		NASCAR Gen 2
1970	Ford Escort 1850 GT		Group 2
1970	Ford Escort Mark I Twin Cam		Group C
1971	Ford Capri RS		Group 2
1971	Ford XY Falcon GTHO Phase III		Group C
1972	Ford Capri V6		Group C
1972	Ford Falcon GTHO Phase III		Group E
1973	Ford Escort Twin Cam		Group C
1973	Ford XA Falcon GT Hardtop		Group C
1974	Ford Capri 3100 RS		Group 2
1974	Ford Escort GT1600		Group C
1974	Ford XB Falcon GT Hardtop		Group C
1976	Ford Escort Mark I RS2000		Group C
1977	Ford Thunderbird		NASCAR Gen 2
1977	Ford XC Falcon GS500 Hardtop		Group C
1978	Ford Escort RS2000		Group C
1979	Ford XC Falcon Cobra		Group C
1980	Ford Capri Mk.II		Group C
1980	Ford Capri Mk.III		Group C
1980	Ford Escort Mk.II		Group C
1981	Ford Capri Mk III		Group 5
1981	Ford Thunderbird		NASCAR Gen 3
1981	Ford XD Falcon		Group C
1981	Ford Zakspeed Mustang Turbo		IMSA GTX IMSA GTP
1982	Ford C100		Group 6 Group C
1982	Ford XE Falcon		Group C
1983	Ford Mustang GT		Group A
1983	Ford Mustang GTP		IMSA GTP
1985	Ford Escort RS Turbo		Group A
1985	Ford Sierra RS/RS500 Cosworth		Group A
1985	Ford Probe GTP		IMSA GTP
1986	Ford RS200		Group B
1986	Ford Sierra RS Cosworth		Group A
1987	Ford Mustang Maxum GTP		IMSA GTP
1992	Ford Thunderbird		NASCAR Gen 4
1994	GEN2 SRF		Spec Racer Ford
1995	Ford Escort RS Cosworth		Group N
1995	Ford F-150		NASCAR Truck
1995	Ford Mondeo Mk I 4Door		Super Touring
1995	Ford Mondeo Mk I 5Door		Super Touring
1995	Ford Mustang Cobra		IMSA GTO
1997	Ford Escort WRC		WRC
1997	Ford Falcon EL		V8 Supercar
1997	Ford Mondeo Mk II 4Door M.Y. 1997		Super Touring
1998	Ford Taurus		NASCAR Gen 4
1999	Ford Focus RS WRC		WRC
1999	Ford Mondeo Mk III Zetec		Super Touring
2005	Ford Mustang FR500C GT4		SRO GT4
2006	Ford Fusion		NASCAR Gen 4
2006	Ford GT		GT300
2007	Ford Fiesta		Group N
2007	Ford Fusion		NASCAR CoT
2007	Ford Mustang FR500C GT		Group GT3
2008	Ford GT GT3		Group GT3
2008	Ford GT-R (Mk.VII)		LM GTE
2009	Ford Fiesta S2000		Super 2000
2010	Ford GT GT1		Group GT1
2010	Ford Mustang GT		Xfinity Car of Tomorrow
2011	Ford Fiesta RS WRC		WRC
2012	Ford Fiesta R1		Group R1
2012	Ford Fiesta R2		Group R2
2012	Ford Focus ST		Next Generation Touring Car
2012	Ford Mustang FR500C GT4		SRO GT4
2013	Ford Falcon FG		New Generation V8 Supercar
2013	Ford Fiesta R5		Group R5
2013	Ford Fusion		NASCAR Gen 6
2013	Ford Mustang		TA2
2014	Ford Focus S2000 TC		Super 2000
2015	Ford Fiesta R2T		Group R2
2015	GEN3 SRF3		Spec Racer Ford
2016	Ford GT (Mk.VIII)		LM GTE
2017	Ford Fiesta WRC		WRC
2017	Ford Mustang GT4		SRO GT4
2018	Ford Focus RS		Next Generation Touring Car
2018	Ford Ranger (T6)		SuperUte
2018	Ford Ranger R23GT		TC Pick Up
2019	Ford Fiesta Rally2		Rally2
2019	Ford Fiesta Rally4		Rally4
2019	Ford Mustang GT		NASCAR Gen 6
2020	Ford Fiesta Rally5		Rally5
2020	Ford Focus ST 20		Next Generation Touring Car
2021	Ford Fiesta Rally3		Rally3
2022	Ford Mustang GT		Next Gen NASCAR
2022	Ford Puma Rally1		Rally1
2023	Ford Mustang GT		Supercars Gen 3
2023	Ford Ranger T1+		Group T1.1
2024	Ford Mustang Dark Horse		Xfinity Car of Tomorrow
2024	Ford Mustang Dark Horse		Next Gen NASCAR
2024	Ford Mustang Dark Horse R		IMSA Ford Mustang Challenge
2024	Ford Mustang GT3		Group GT3
2024	Ford Mustang GT4		SRO GT4
2024	Ford Raptor RS Cross Country		Group T1.1
2024	Ford Raptor T1+		Group T1.1
2027	TBA		LMDh
2029	TBA		WRC27

== See also ==
- Ford Performance Vehicles Special Vehicle Team (SVT), North America's performance car division
- Ford Team RS European performance car divisions (Ford's ST and RS)
- Ford Performance Vehicles (FPV), Australia's performance car division
- Ford Special Vehicle Operations (SVO)
- Cosworth, former long standing performance engine development partner
- Roush Performance
- M-Sport
