= Generation 4 (NASCAR) =

Vehicles used from 1992–2007 in the Cup Series

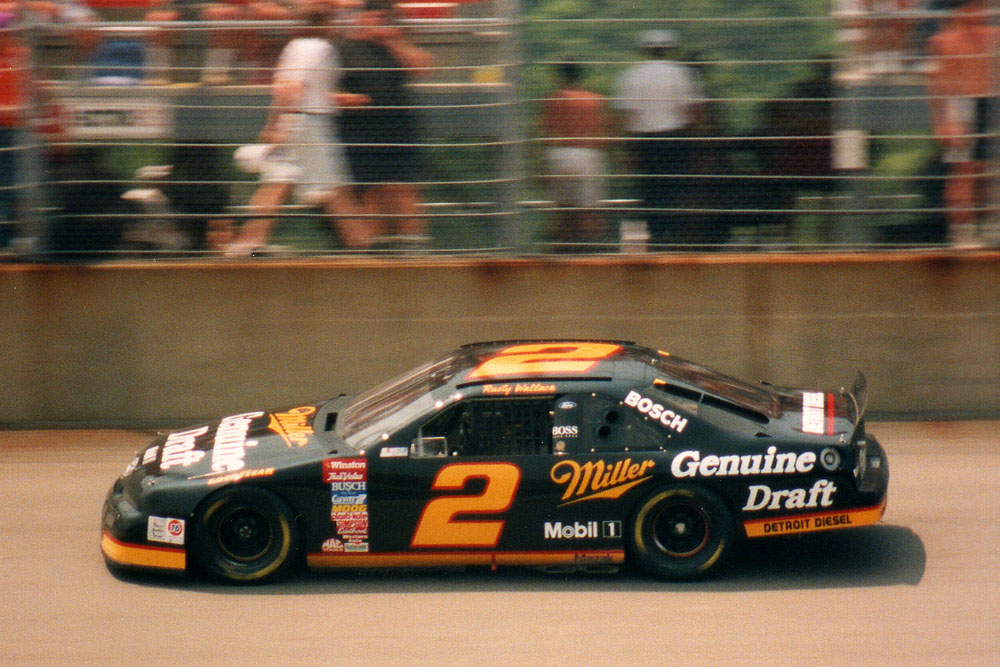
- Rusty Wallace's 1994 Ford Thunderbird at Michigan International Speedway
- Constructor: (United States) Chevrolet (United States) Ford (United States) Pontiac (1992–2003) (United States) Dodge (2001–2007) (Japan) Toyota (2007) (United States) Oldsmobile (1992)
- Predecessor: Generation 3
- Successor: Car of Tomorrow

Technical specifications
- Wheelbase: 110 in (279.4 cm)
- Engine: 90° pushrod V-8 358 cubic inches (5,870 cc)
- Fuel: Unocal 76 110 (1992-2003); Sunoco Supreme 112 Leaded (2004-2006); Sunoco 260 GTX unleaded (2007)
- Tires: Goodyear; Hoosier (1994)

Competition history
- Debut: February 16, 1992 (1992 Daytona 500)
- Last event: November 18, 2007 (2007 Ford 400)

The Generation 4 car was the NASCAR vehicle generation that was used in the NASCAR Cup Series full-time from 1992 to 2006 and part-time in 2007, in the Busch/Nationwide Series until 2010, and in the ARCA Racing Series until 2017. The generation has been described as the generation that removed all "stock" aspects from stock car racing and was as aerodynamically sensitive as a Le Mans Prototype.

Generation 4 cars feature highly modified bodies with teams spending hours in the wind tunnel to gain aerodynamics. The bumpers, nose and tail are composed of molded fiberglass based on production counterparts. In the 2000s teams began using different RPM levels on their engines making each team and manufacturer sound different.

== History ==
In 1992, the Gen 4 car arrived at the sport when steel bodies became primarily custom made instead of using stock pieces, and wind tunnels became a staple as teams worked to gain aerodynamics. At racing speeds approaching 200 miles per hour, a modern NASCAR race car can generate enough lift to get airborne if it spins sideways. To keep cars firmly planted, roof flaps were required in 1994.

1994 was also the final year that V6 engines were used in the Busch Series, as many short track series had abandoned six-cylinder engines.

In 1995, Chevrolet switched back to the Monte Carlo, which started the trend of rounder body shapes in Cup as a body facelift and the then-Busch Series. In 1998, Ford introduced the Taurus, which was the first four-door stock car model approved for NASCAR competition in the modern era.

In 2001, DaimlerChrysler made its return to NASCAR with the Dodge brand utilizing the Intrepid model that commanded by Mercedes-Benz Motorsport Vice President Norbert Haug. That same year, Dale Earnhardt died from a crash at the Daytona 500, leading NASCAR to make serious safety changes. In 2003, in response to the asymmetrical body of the Taurus in the previous seasons, NASCAR set up new body rules, better known as the "common body templates" rule or the "Approved Body Configuration" (ABC); as a result, the hood, roof, and decklid were no longer required to be identical to their stock counterparts. In 2004, the sport switched from Unocal 76 fuel to Sunoco.

The Gen 4 car was used full time until 2007, and it was retired in the Cup Series after the 2007 season (in which Toyota, who had already competed in the NASCAR Craftsman Truck Series, made their debut in the Cup and the then-Busch Series with the Camry), while the other sixteen races were run by the fifth-generation Car of Tomorrow. The Car of Tomorrow went full-time in 2008, with the second-tier series adopting their own Car of Tomorrow first part-time in 2010 and full-time the following year. Body panels in the style of the Gen 4 car continue to be manufactured by Five Star Race Car Bodies, and were legal in the ARCA Racing Series until 2020, when composite-bodied cars in the style of the Generation 6 were mandated (despite this, modern ARCA cars still use Gen 4 chassis). The Gen 4 body panels remained legal in the ARCA Menards Series East until 2017, and the ARCA Menards Series West until 2021; Hailie Deegan scored her first NASCAR win at the Las Vegas Motor Speedway dirt track in a Gen 4 Toyota Camry in 2019. As of 2026, Five Star Race Car Bodies continues producing evolved versions of the Gen 4 design as the NextGen LMSC (Late Model Stock Car) and ABC NextGen, as well as producing the older, classic Gen 4 design.

In the generation's final years, aerodynamic development led to some of the cars (otherwise known as "offset" bodies) being called "twisted sisters" in reference to the asymmetrical shapes of the car's body. The Car of Tomorrow, by contrast, featured a symmetrical body in order to curb aerodynamic development wars in an attempt to cut costs.

== Models ==
Manufacturer	Chassis	Usage	Image	Notes
Chevrolet	Impala	2009–2010		Nationwide Series only
Chevrolet	Lumina	1992–1994		
Chevrolet	Monte Carlo	1995–2005		
Chevrolet	Monte Carlo SS	2006–2007		Use continued until 2008 in Nationwide Series
Dodge	Charger	2005–2007		Use continued until 2010 in Nationwide Series
Dodge	Intrepid	2001–2004		No model branding in 2004
Ford	Fusion	2006–2007		Use continued until 2010 in Nationwide Series
Ford	Taurus	1998–2005		
Ford	Thunderbird	1992–1999		Limited superspeedway use after 1997
Pontiac	Grand Prix	1992–2004		No factory support after 2003, use continued until 2005 in Busch Series, and until 2007 in the ARCA Racing Series
Toyota	Camry	2007		Use continued until 2010 in Nationwide Series

== See also ==
- Cup Series cars
