= Generation 1 (NASCAR) =

First generation of NASCAR race cars (1948-1966)

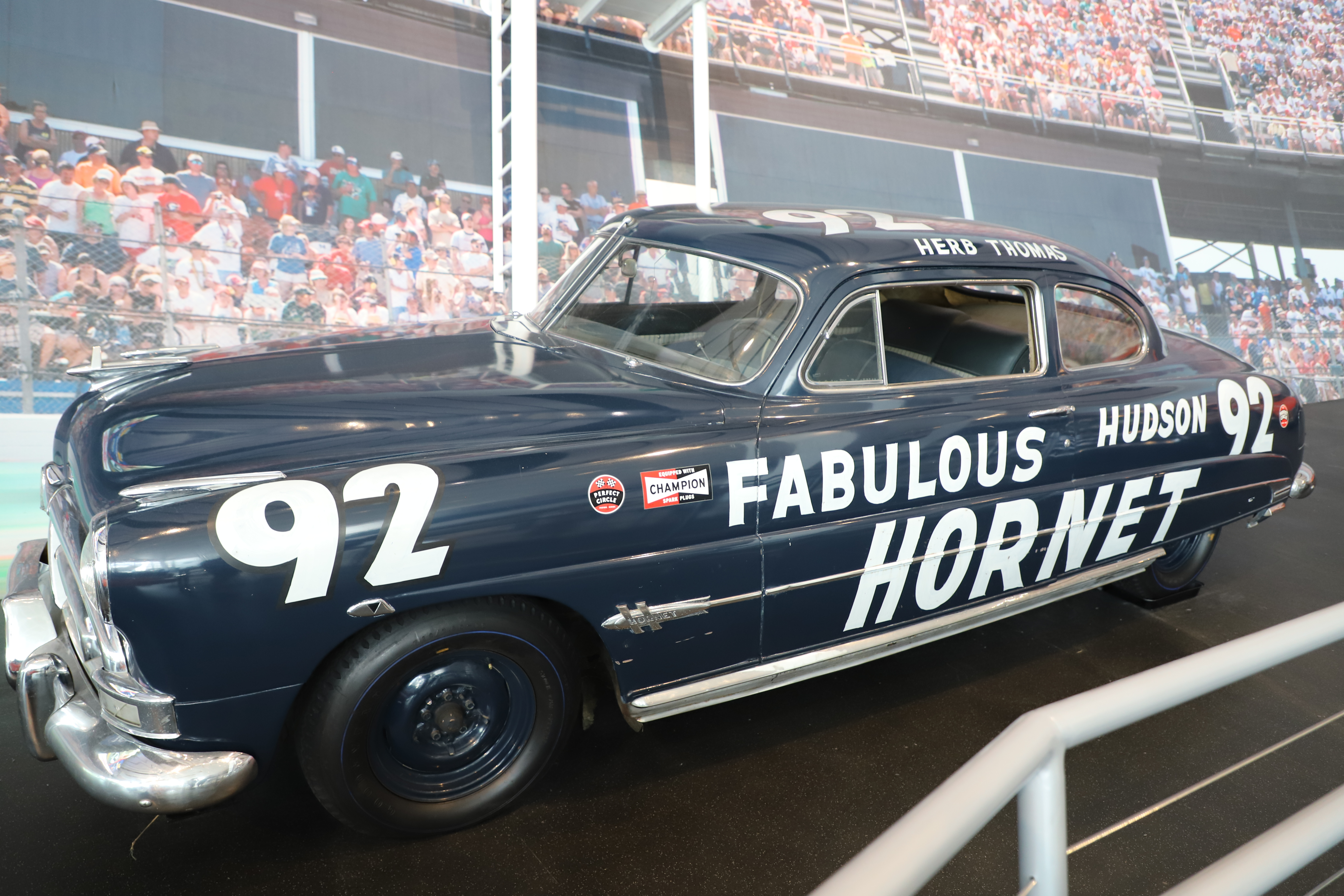
- Hudson Hornet at the NASCAR Hall of Fame in Charlotte, North Carolina
- Constructor: (United States) Hudson (United States) Chevrolet (United States) Ford (United States) Plymouth (United States) Oldsmobile (United States) Pontiac (United States) Studebaker
- Successor: Generation 2

Technical specifications
- Engine: 90° pushrod V-8; Inline-six (Hudson Hornet only) 303–440 cu in (5.0–7.2 L)

Competition history
- Debut: February 15, 1948 (Daytona Beach Road Course, Florida)
- Last event: October 30, 1966 (1966 American 500)

The Generation 1 in NASCAR refers to the first generation of post-war race cars used between 1948 and 1966. The first generation of stock cars used a strictly-stock body and frame, the doors were strapped with the use of seat belts being required, and a heavy-duty rear axle was mandated to stop the cars from rolling over during a race. These cars were almost identical to their road-going counterparts, albeit with tuning and modifications to the car itself being prohibited. It was also notable for being the only generation of stock cars to use real doors. Examples include the Hudson Hornet, Oldsmobile Rocket 88, Ford Galaxie, Plymouth Belvedere, Pontiac Catalina, and the Chevrolet Impala.

They were eventually replaced by the Generation 2 cars in 1967.

== Models ==
Manufacturer	Chassis	Usage	Image
Chevrolet	Impala	1958–1962	
Ford	Galaxie	1958–1965	
Ford	Thunderbird	1959–1964	
Hudson	Hornet	1950–1954	
Oldsmobile	Rocket 88	1949–1953	
Plymouth	Belvedere	1959	
Pontiac	Catalina	1950–1958	
Studebaker	Starlight	1949–1952	
