= Generation 3 (NASCAR) =

NASCAR cars used 1981 to 1991

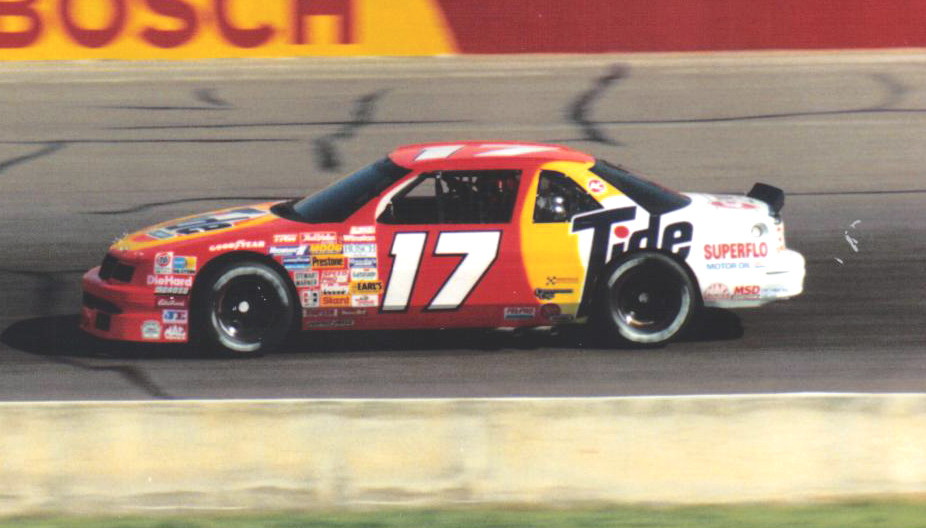
- Darrell Waltrip's 1989 Chevrolet Lumina at Phoenix Raceway
- Constructor: (United States) Chevrolet (United States) Ford (United States) Oldsmobile (United States) Pontiac (United States) Buick (United States) Dodge (until 1983) (United States) Chrysler (1981-1985)
- Predecessor: Generation 2
- Successor: Generation 4

Technical specifications
- Wheelbase: 110 inches
- Engine: 90° pushrod V-8 358 cubic inches (5,870 cc)
- Fuel: Unocal 76 110 (1981-1991)
- Tires: Goodyear; Hoosier (1988-1989)

Competition history
- Debut: February 15, 1981 (1981 Daytona 500)
- Last event: November 17, 1991 (1991 Hardee's 500)

The Generation 3 refers to the generation of stock cars used in NASCAR from 1981 to 1991, and it was used in the Busch Series at its modern beginning in 1982. In this generation, NASCAR downsized the cars to better resemble cars on the showroom floor (with wheelbase at 110 inches), and body panels were still purchased through the manufacturers.

== History ==
=== Cup Series ===
The Generation 3 era began in 1981 and, as a consequence of the second aero war between General Motors and Ford that also extended to their production models, featured bigger spoilers, and streamlined designs that barely resembled their showroom counterparts. The wheelbase was reduced to 110 inches in response to the demand of the production car market at the time, making the cars smaller than the previous two generations.

These were the cars that necessitated restrictor plates at Daytona and Talladega. In 1987 at Talladega, Bill Elliott set what remains the NASCAR qualifying record of 212.809 mph (342.483 km/h) at Talladega, circling the track in 44.998 seconds. But soon into the race, Bobby Allison's car went airborne and nearly went into the main grandstands, and that was the last unrestricted race on either of the two giant tracks. He also set the qualifying lap of 210.364 mph (338.548 km/h) at Daytona in 1987, circling the oval in 42.783 seconds, which still stands today. NASCAR mandated smaller carburetors for the rest of that season, and in 1988 required the restrictor plates.

The Generation 3 cars were used until 1991. It was the last generation without roof flaps (mandated in 1994). It was succeeded by the Generation 4 cars in 1992.

=== Busch Series ===
In 1982, NASCAR's then-new second national series (currently known as the NASCAR O'Reilly Auto Parts Series) competitors began looking at alternatives from the 5-litre based 311 cu in (5.1 L) engines, as in short track racing there was a push for six-cylinder engines to save on costs, with some series allowing weight breaks. One popular idea was to use 231–275 cu in (3.8–4.5 L) six-cylinder engines; instead of Cup Series' 358 cu in (5.9 L) V-8s. In 1989, NASCAR changed rules requiring cars to use current body styles, similar to the Cup cars. However, the cars still used V6 engines. The cars gradually became similar to Cup cars.

== Models ==
Manufacturer	Chassis	Usage	Image
Buick	LeSabre	1986–1987	
Buick	Regal	1981–1985, 1988–1991	
Chevrolet	Lumina	1989–1991	
Chevrolet	Malibu	1981–1982	
Chevrolet	Monte Carlo	1981–1989	
Chrysler	Cordoba	1980–1983	
Chrysler	Imperial	1981–1985	
Dodge	Mirada	1981–1985	
Ford	Thunderbird	1981–1991	
Oldsmobile	Cutlass	1981–1991	
Oldsmobile	Delta 88	1986–1987	
Pontiac	Grand Prix	1981–1991	
Pontiac	LeMans	1981–1983	

== See also ==
- Cup Series cars
