= Generation 2 (NASCAR) =

Race cars between 1967 and 1980

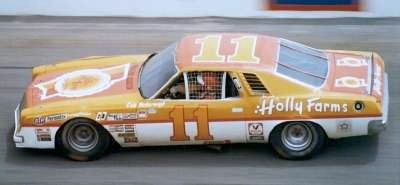
- Cale Yarborough's No. 11 Chevrolet Chevelle Laguna
- Constructor: (United States) Chevrolet (United States) Ford (United States) Oldsmobile (United States) Buick (United States) Dodge
- Predecessor: Generation 1
- Successor: Generation 3

Technical specifications
- Engine: 90° pushrod V-8 305–440 cu in (5.0–7.2 L)

Competition history
- Debut: January 22, 1967 (1967 Motor Trend 500)
- Last event: January 11, 1981 (1981 Winston Western 500)

The Generation 2 in NASCAR refers to the cars used between 1967 and 1980. The second generation of stock cars featured stock body with a modified frame, and modified chassis became part of the sport with entities such as Holman-Moody, Banjo Matthews, and Hutcherson-Pagan building chassis for teams.

Although cars began to show modifications compared to the road-going versions, NASCAR still required a minimum number of cars (500 cars in 1969) to be sold to the general public. For 1969 and 1970, Ford and Chrysler developed aerodynamic homologation special models that were later dubbed the Aero Warriors.

Changes in the United States automotive market that downsized passenger cars led to the Generation 3 cars in 1981, which featured shorter wheelbase and the cars being increasingly purpose-built.

== Models ==
Manufacturer	Chassis	Usage	Image
AMC	Matador	1971–1978	
Buick	Century	1973–1979	
Buick	Regal	1973–1979	
Chevrolet	Chevelle	1967–1972	
Chevrolet	Chevelle Laguna	1973–1977	
Chevrolet	Malibu	1967–1977	
Chevrolet	Monte Carlo	1971–1980	
Chrysler	Cordoba	1975–1980	
Dodge	Charger	1967–1977	
Dodge	Charger Daytona	1969–1970	
Dodge	Magnum	1978–1979	
Ford	Fairlane	1967–1970	
Ford	Torino	1968–1976	
Ford	Thunderbird	1977–1979	
Mercury	Cyclone	1968–1971	
Mercury	Cyclone Spoiler II	1969	
Mercury	Montego	1968–1976	
Oldsmobile	442	1977–1980	
Oldsmobile	Cutlass	1977–1979	
Plymouth	Belvedere	1967	
Plymouth	Road Runner	1968–1977	
Plymouth	Superbird	1970	
Pontiac	Grand Am	1973–1977	
