= Ford Fiesta (sixth generation) =

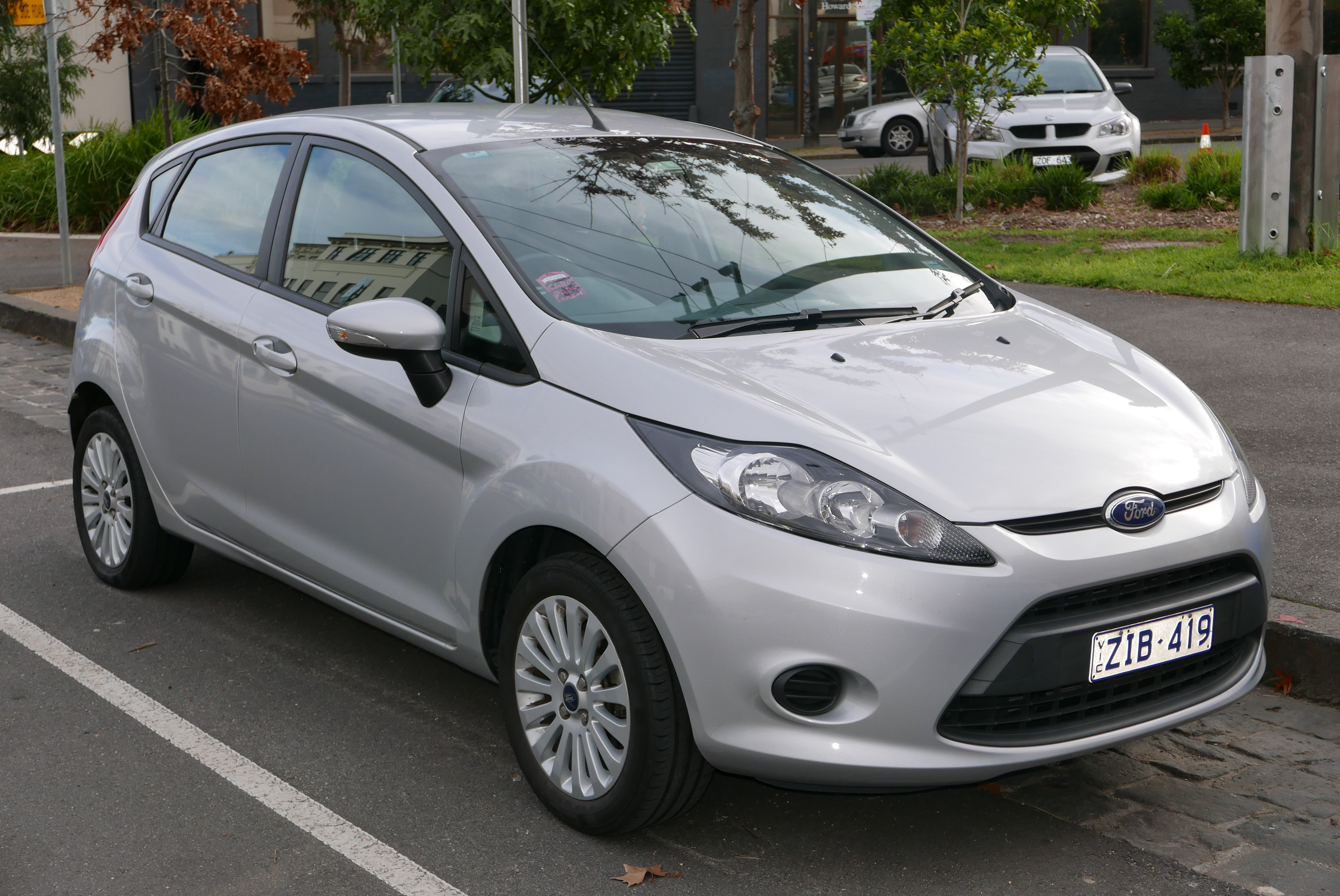
- Ford Fiesta LX 5-door hatchback (Australia; pre-facelift)

Overview
- Manufacturer: Ford
- Model code: B299 (hatchback); B409 (sedan); WS; WT; WZ (Australia)
- Production: August 2008 – April 2017; June 2010 – August 2019 (Mexico)
- Model years: 2009–2017; 2011–2019 (North America)
- Assembly: Germany: Cologne (CB&A); Spain: Almussafes (Ford Valencia); Mexico: Cuautitlán Izcalli (CSAP); Brazil: São Bernardo do Campo (Ford Brazil); China: Nanjing (Changan Ford Mazda); Thailand: Rayong (AAT: 2010–2012; FTM: 2012–2018); Vietnam: Hai Duong (Ford Vietnam); Taiwan: Taoyuan (Ford Lio Ho); India: Chennai (Ford India); Venezuela: Valencia; Russia: Naberezhnye Chelny (Ford Sollers)
- Designer: Stefan Lamm

Body and chassis
- Class: Supermini (B)
- Body style: 3/5-door hatchback; 4-door saloon; 3-door panel van
- Platform: Ford global B-car platform
- Related: Ford EcoSport; Ford B-Max; Ford Ka (third generation) / Figo (second generation); Mazda2 (second generation)

Powertrain
- Engine: Petrol: 1.0 L Fox Ti-VCT I3 (facelift); 1.0 L Ecoboost SCTi I3 (facelift); 1.25 L Duratec Ti-VCT I4; 1.4 L Duratec Ti-VCT I4; 1.5 L Duratec Ti-VCT I4 (facelift); 1.6 L Duratec Ti-VCT I4; 1.6 L Ecoboost SCTi I4 (facelift); Diesel: 1.4 L Duratorq TDCi I4; 1.5 L Duratorq TDCi I4 (facelift); 1.6 L Duratorq TDCi I4
- Transmission: 4-speed 4F27E automatic; 5-speed IB5 manual; 6-speed PowerShift DPS6 DCT; 6-speed B6 manual (ST)

Dimensions
- Wheelbase: 2,489 mm (98.0 in)
- Length: 3,950–4,067 mm (155.5–160.1 in) (hatchback); 4,291–4,409 mm (169–174 in) (saloon)
- Width: 1,709–1,722 mm (67.3–67.8 in)
- Height: 1,453–1,495 mm (57.2–58.9 in) (hatchback); 1,453–1,473 mm (57.2–58.0 in) (saloon)
- Curb weight: 966–1,244 kg (2,130–2,743 lb) (hatchback); 1,100–1,192 kg (2,425–2,628 lb) (saloon)

Chronology
- Predecessor: Ford Fiesta (fifth generation)
- Successor: Ford Fiesta (seventh generation); Ford Escort (China) (sedan, Taiwan)

The Ford Fiesta Mk6/Mark VI (Mk7 in the United Kingdom, model code WS/WT/WZ in Australia) is the sixth generation of the Ford Fiesta supermini. The sixth generation Fiesta was shown in a concept car form as the Ford Verve at the Frankfurt Motor Show in September 2007, with introductions in Europe, the Americas, Asia, Australasia, and Africa. Developed under the project code B299 and B409, the model uses the Ford global B-car platform newly developed for the model.

The model was launched under the company's new "One Ford" strategy, which called for single models to be manufactured and sold globally to achieve efficiency and economies of scale, instead of making regional models. Production started at Ford's Cologne plant in Germany in August 2008. A second plant in Valencia, Spain started production in early 2009. Productions in China, Thailand and Mexico started between late 2008 to 2010. In Brazil, the production of the hatchback version started in 2013.

== Verve concepts ==
The Ford Verve concepts are series of subcompact car concepts from Ford Motor Company which the sixth generation Ford Fiesta (Mark VI) was based upon. The Ford Verve was intended to meet market demands for smaller, more fuel-efficient cars. The Verve was created in both four- and three-door body styles. The 3-door hatchback and 4-door saloon versions of the Fiesta were both based on the Verve, with the 5-door hatchback and the 3-door van being their derivatives.

=== First Verve concept ===
The Verve concept was first shown at the 2007 Frankfurt Motor Show. It continued Ford's Kinetic Design family styling theme, first seen on the Ford S-MAX. Martin Smith, executive director of design for Ford of Europe, described the Verve as "a chic, modern and individualistic statement for a sophisticated, fashion-aware generation." The concept was created by a team of designers from Ford studios in Dunton, England, and Cologne, Germany.

The interior featured leather in different hues, along with multimedia equipment. The three-door hatchback featured a panoramic glass roof, pillarless side glass, LED headlamps, high-mounted LED taillamps, integrated tailgate spoiler and dark-chrome lower diffuser with integrated centre exhaust outlet. The car rode on 18-inch low-profile tyres mounted on two-piece, 12-spoke alloy wheels.

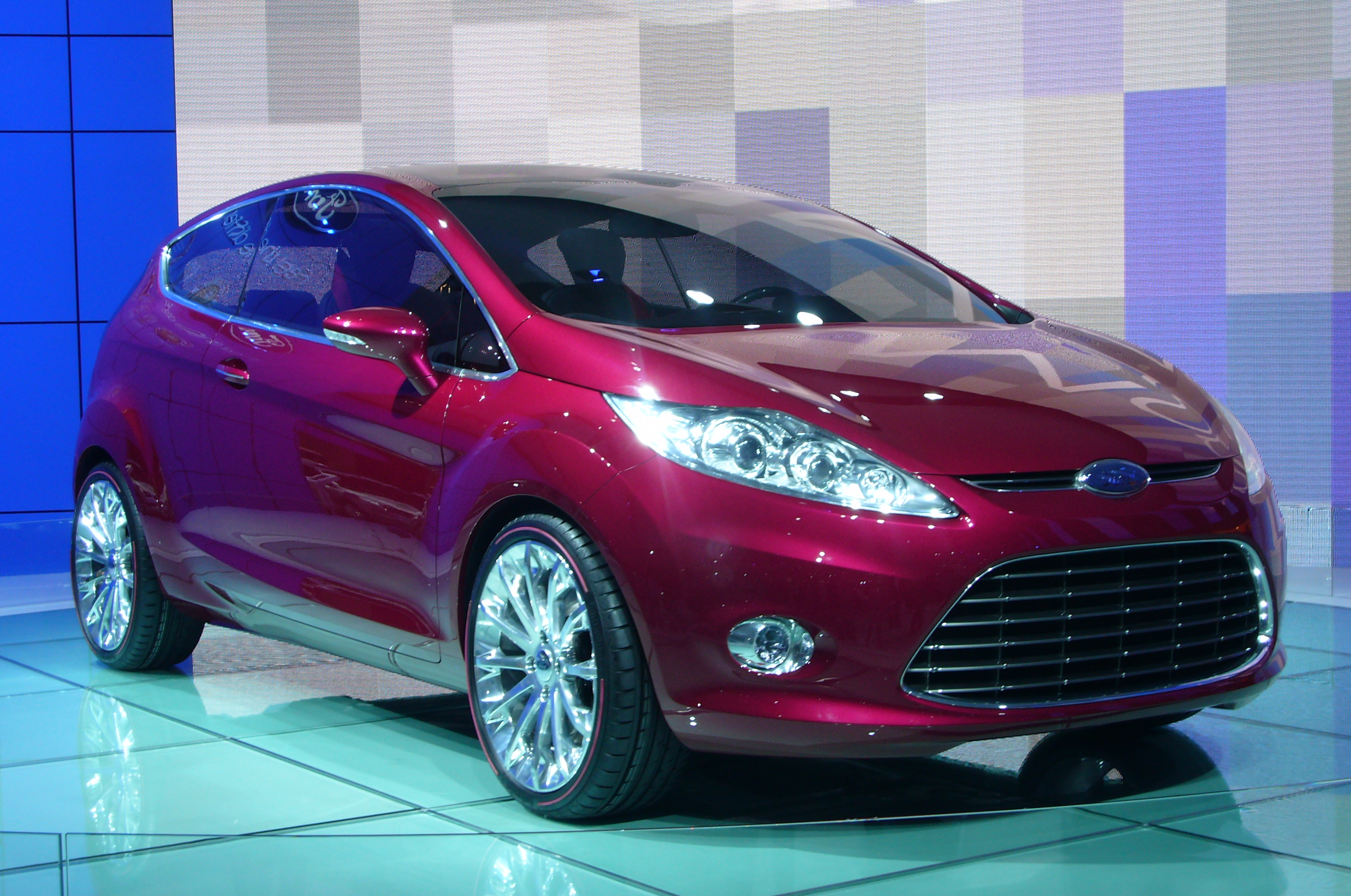
Ford Verve Concept (European three door, 2007)

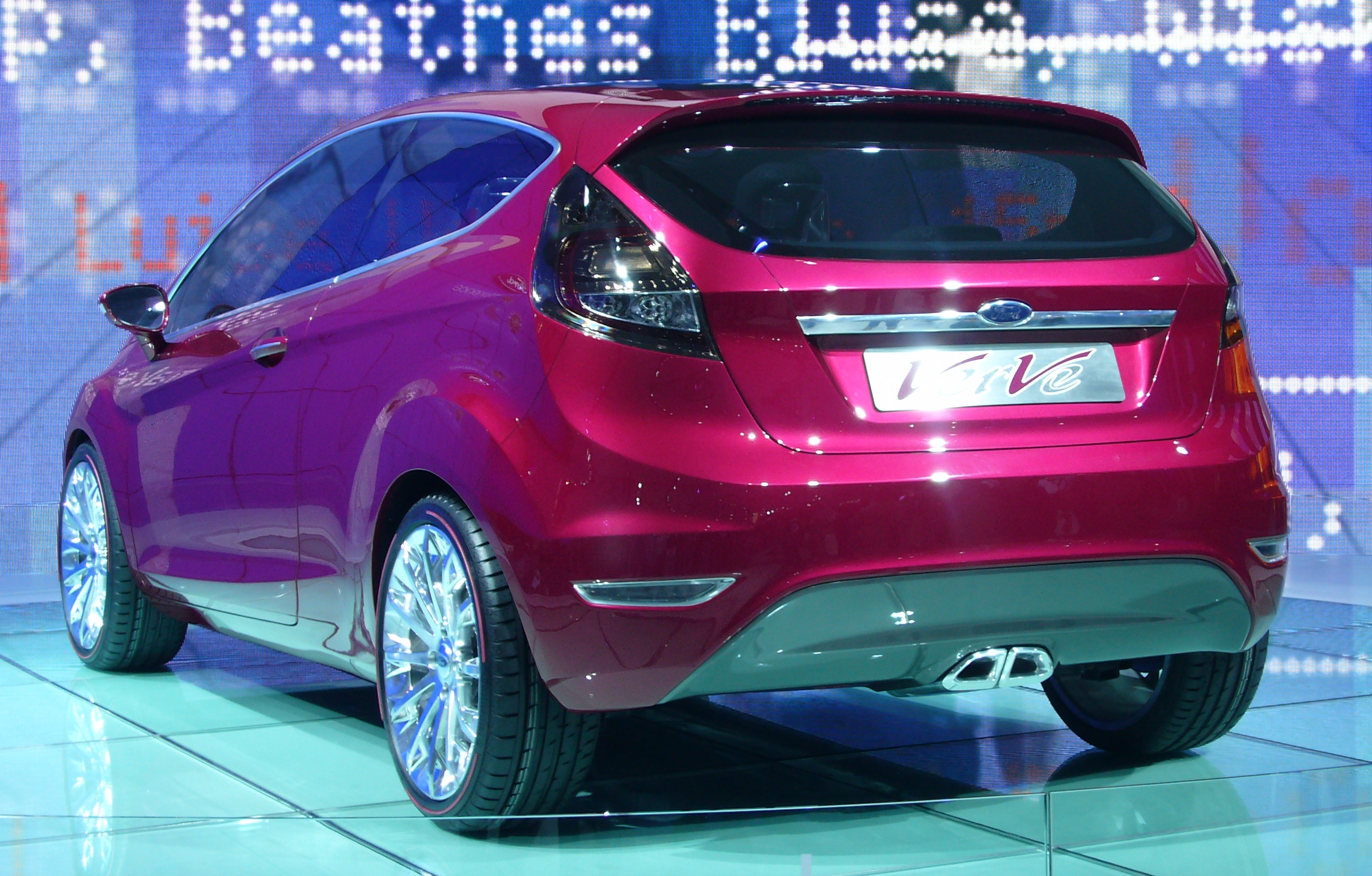
Ford Verve Concept (European three door, 2007)

=== Second Verve concept ===
On November 19, 2007, Ford unveiled its second Verve concept. This second version took the form of a four-door notchback and was styled similarly to the Frankfurt version of the car. It was finished in frosted grape.

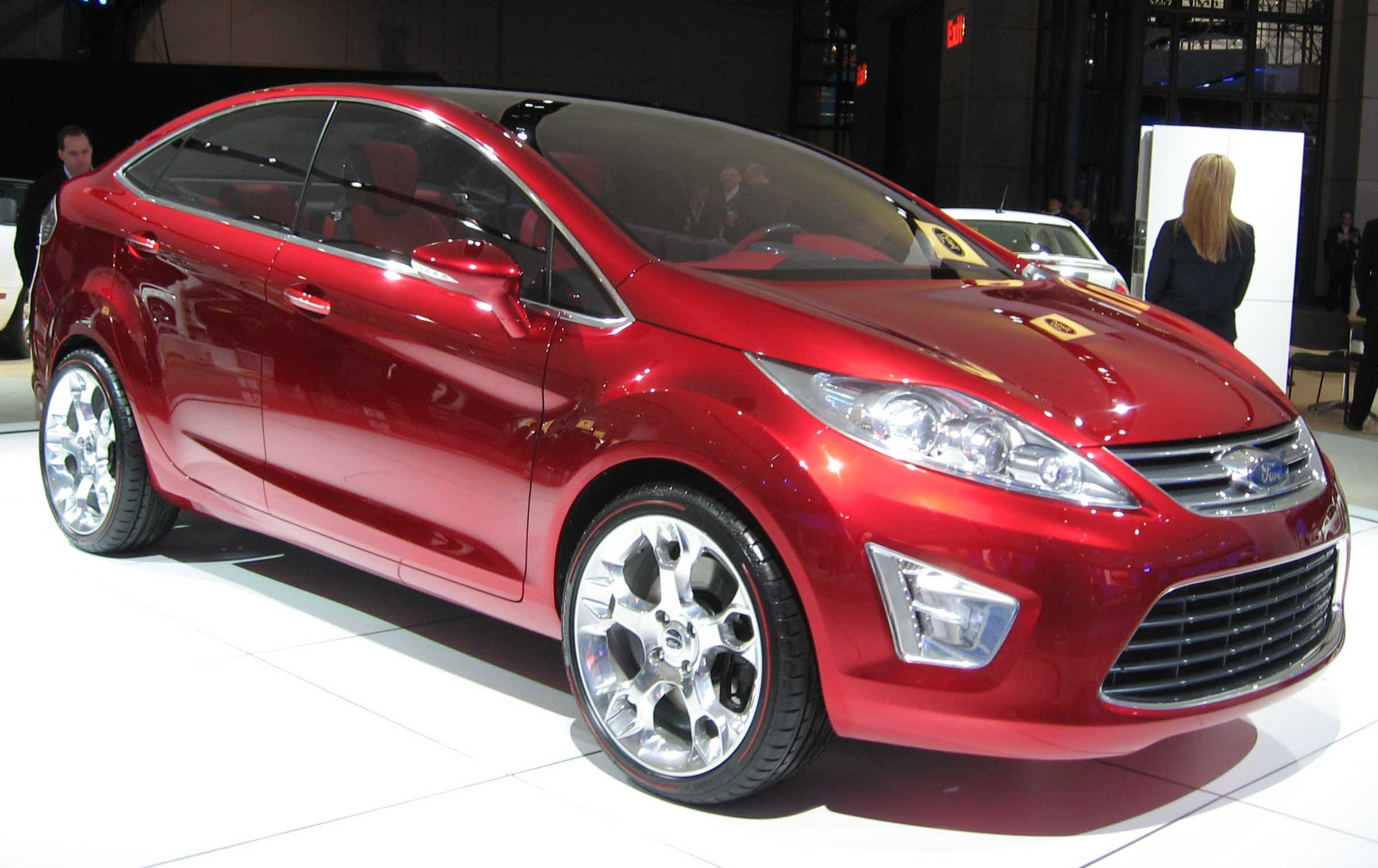
Ford Verve concept (North American sedan, 2008)

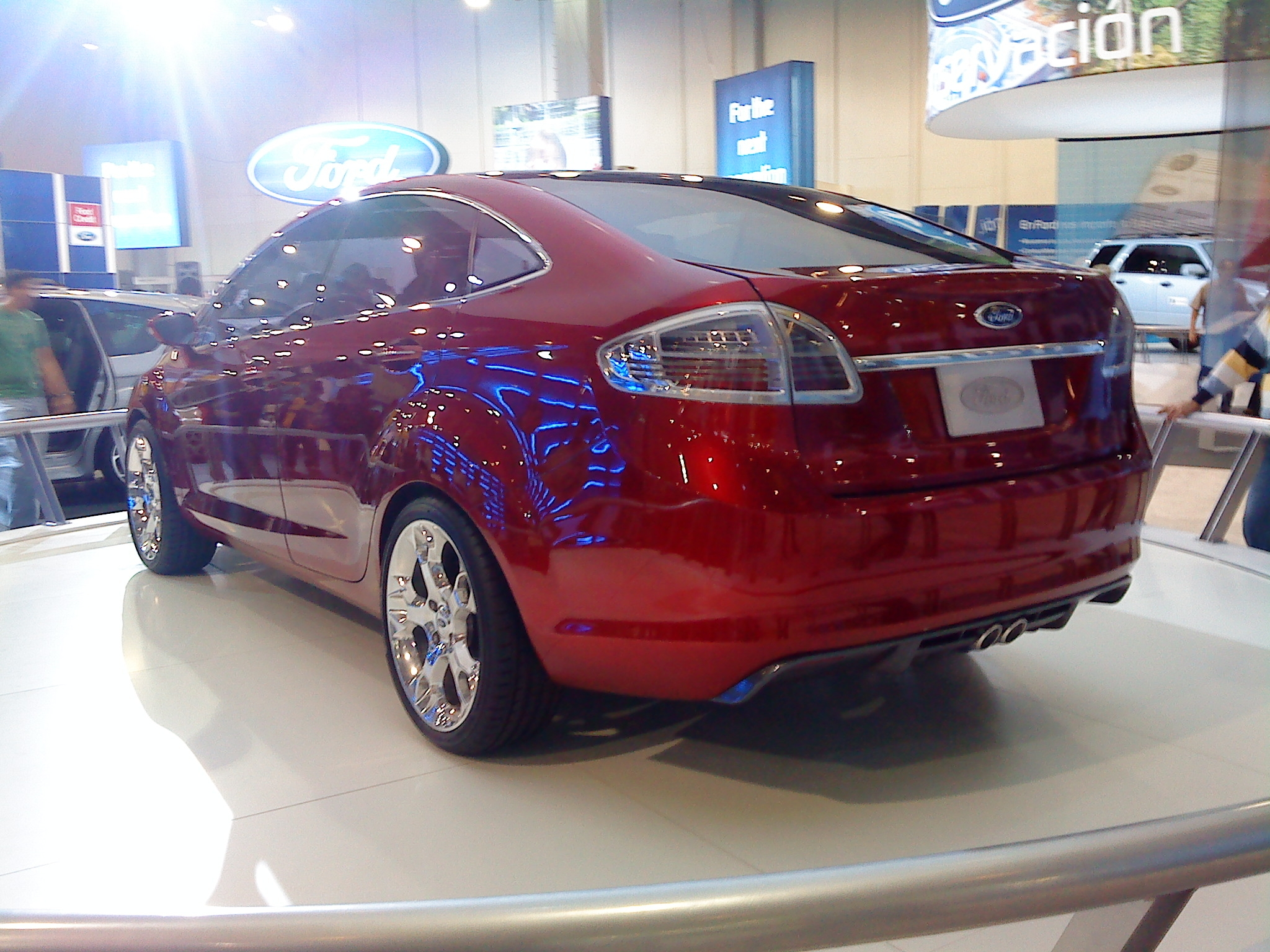
Ford Verve concept (North American sedan, 2008)

=== Third Verve concept ===
Another four-door Verve concept car for North America was revealed at the North American International Auto Show in January 2008. It was finished in Rouge Red, and unique to this version, featured a modified front fascia. The most notable changes were in a deeper upper grille, with Ford of North America's trademark 'three-bar' graphic, and a downsized lower inverted trapezoidal grille.

== Body styles ==
There are four body styles available for the sixth generation Fiesta, including three- and five-door hatchbacks, four-door sedan, and a three-door van.

=== Hatchback ===
The five-door hatchback was sold globally except in India. The three-door hatchback version was sold in Europe (except Russia), Australasia, and select parts of Asia such as Singapore.

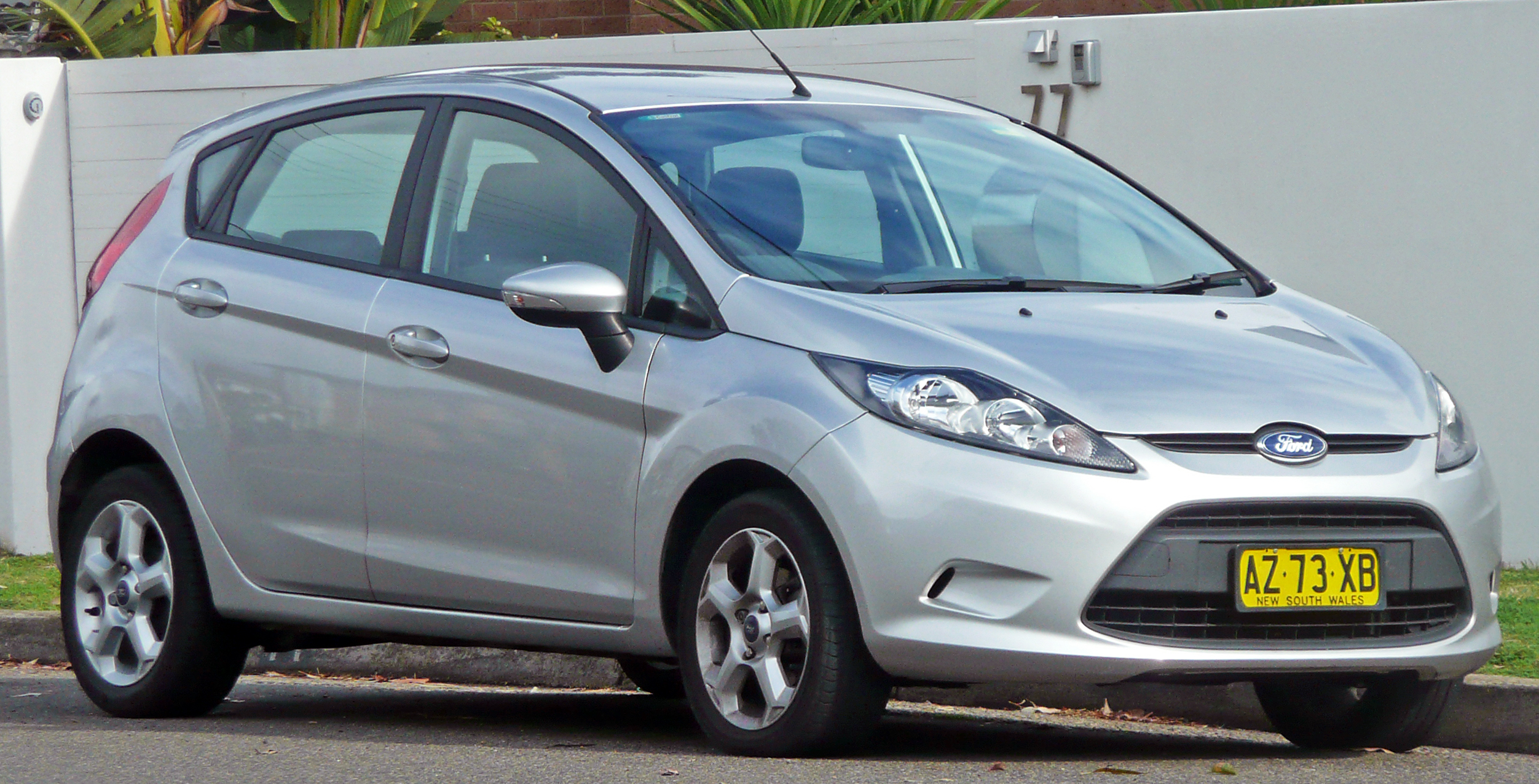
Ford Fiesta Zetec 5-door hatchback (Australia; pre-facelift)

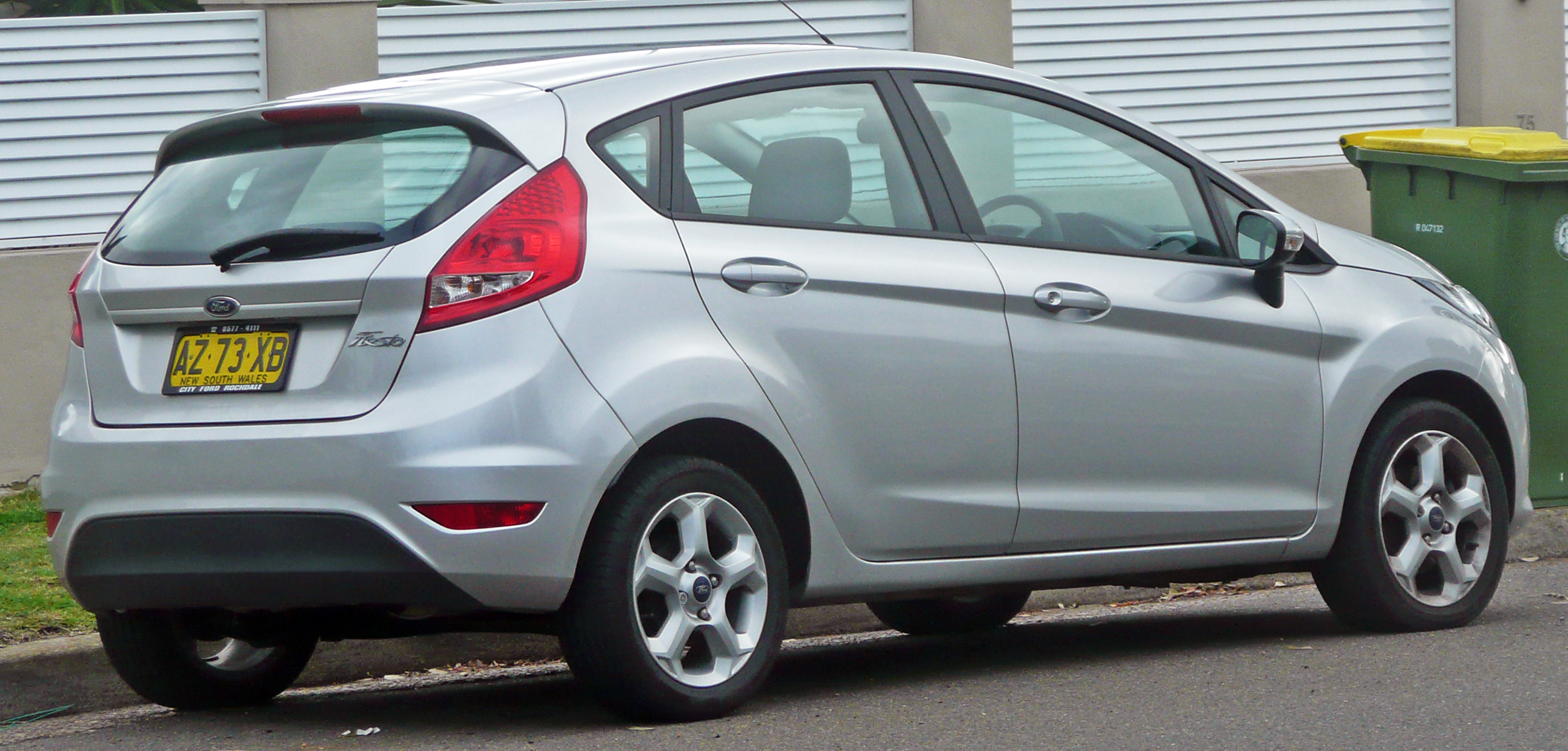
Ford Fiesta Zetec 5-door hatchback (Australia; pre-facelift)

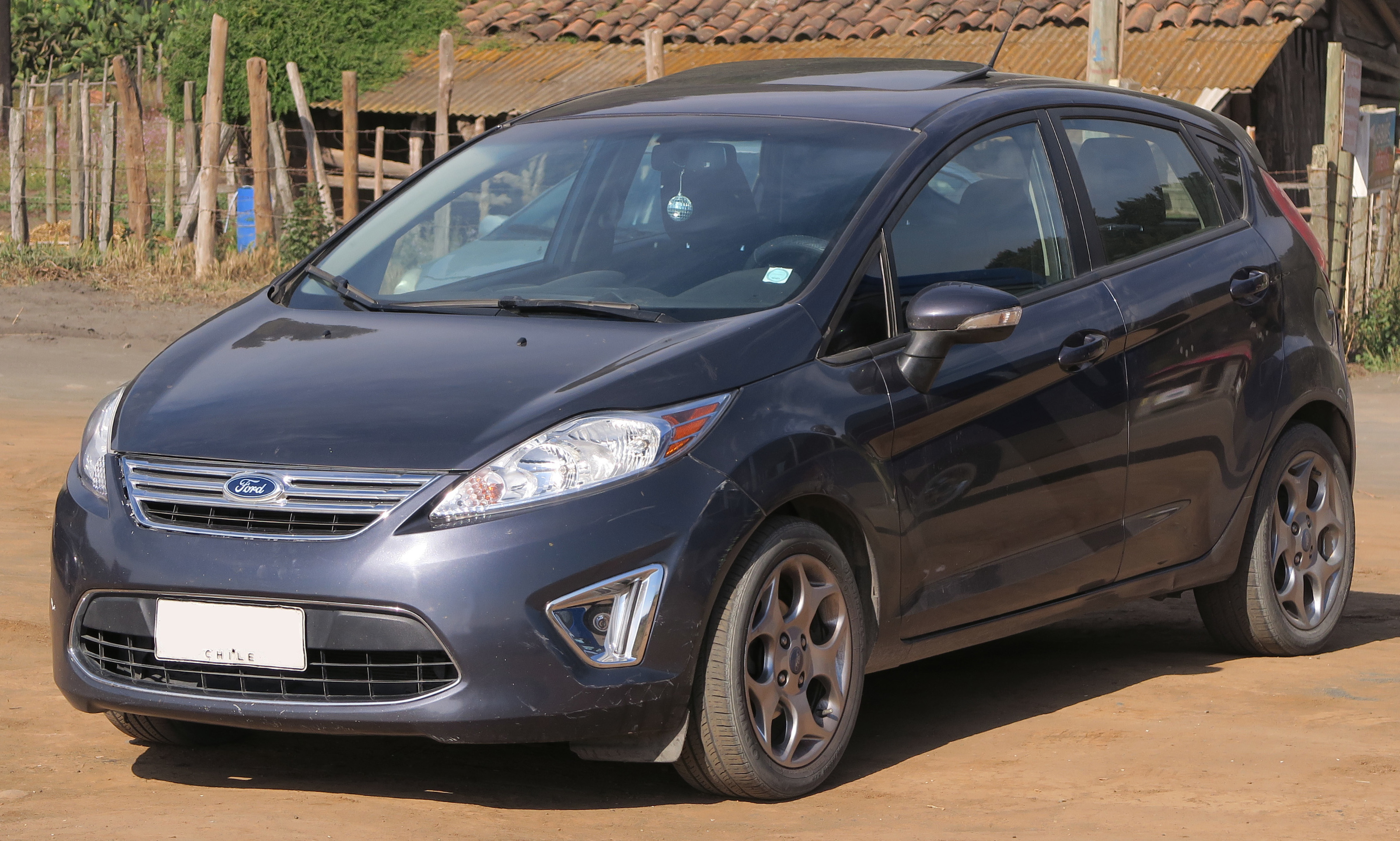
Ford Fiesta Titanium 5-door hatchback (Chile; Americas-styling pre-facelift)

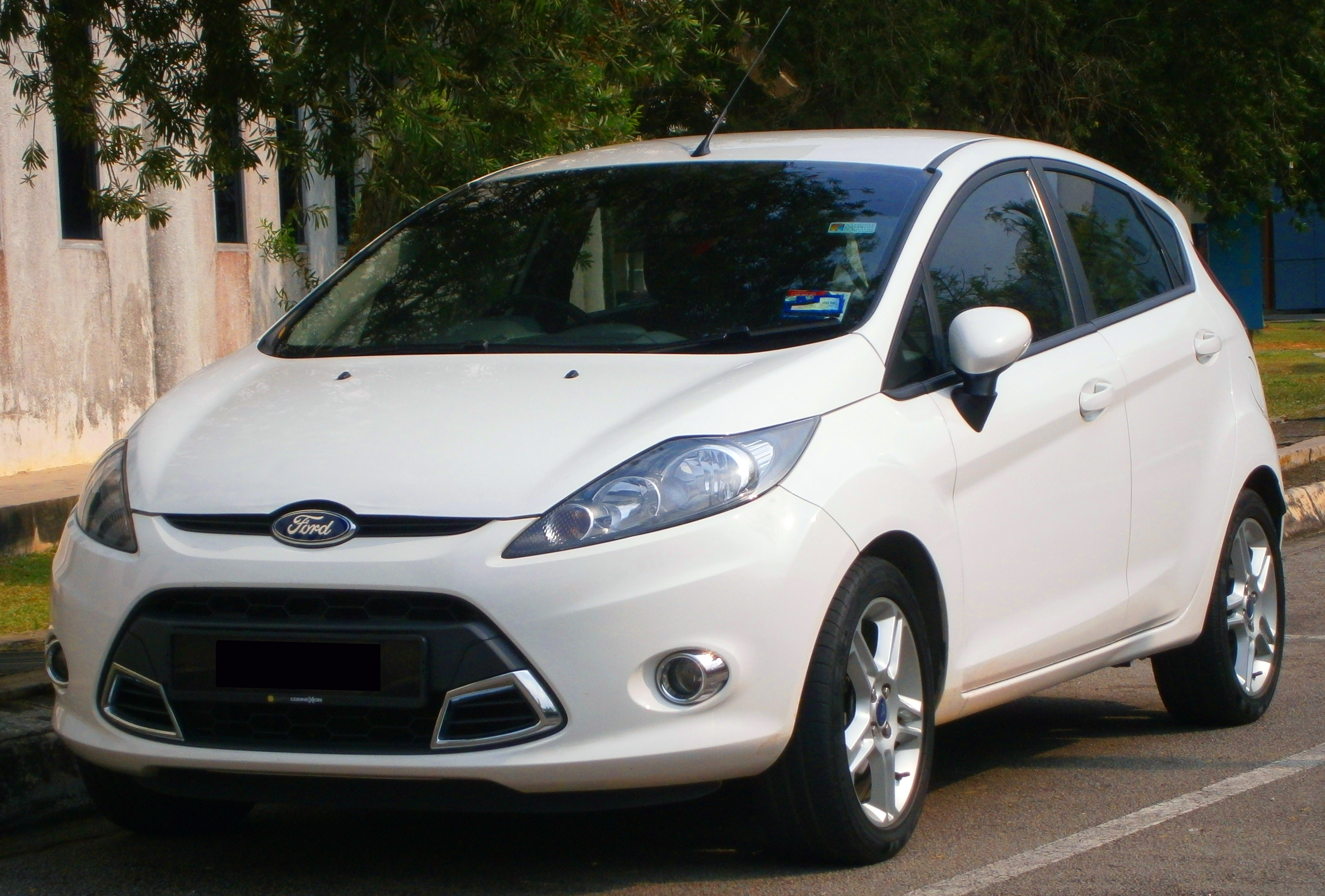
Ford Fiesta Sport 5-door hatchback (Malaysia; Asian-styling pre-facelift)

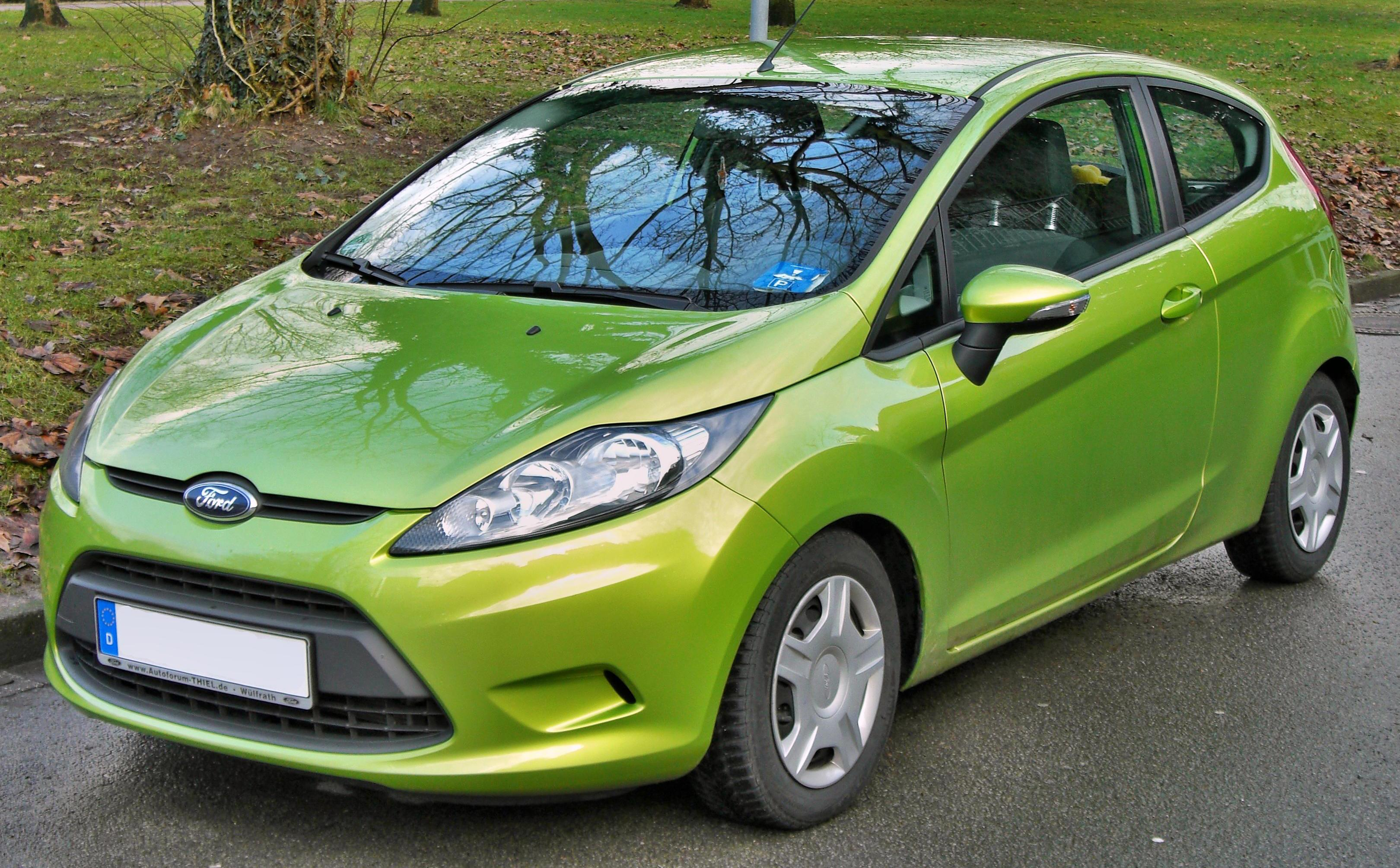
Ford Fiesta Trend 3-door hatchback (Germany; pre-facelift)

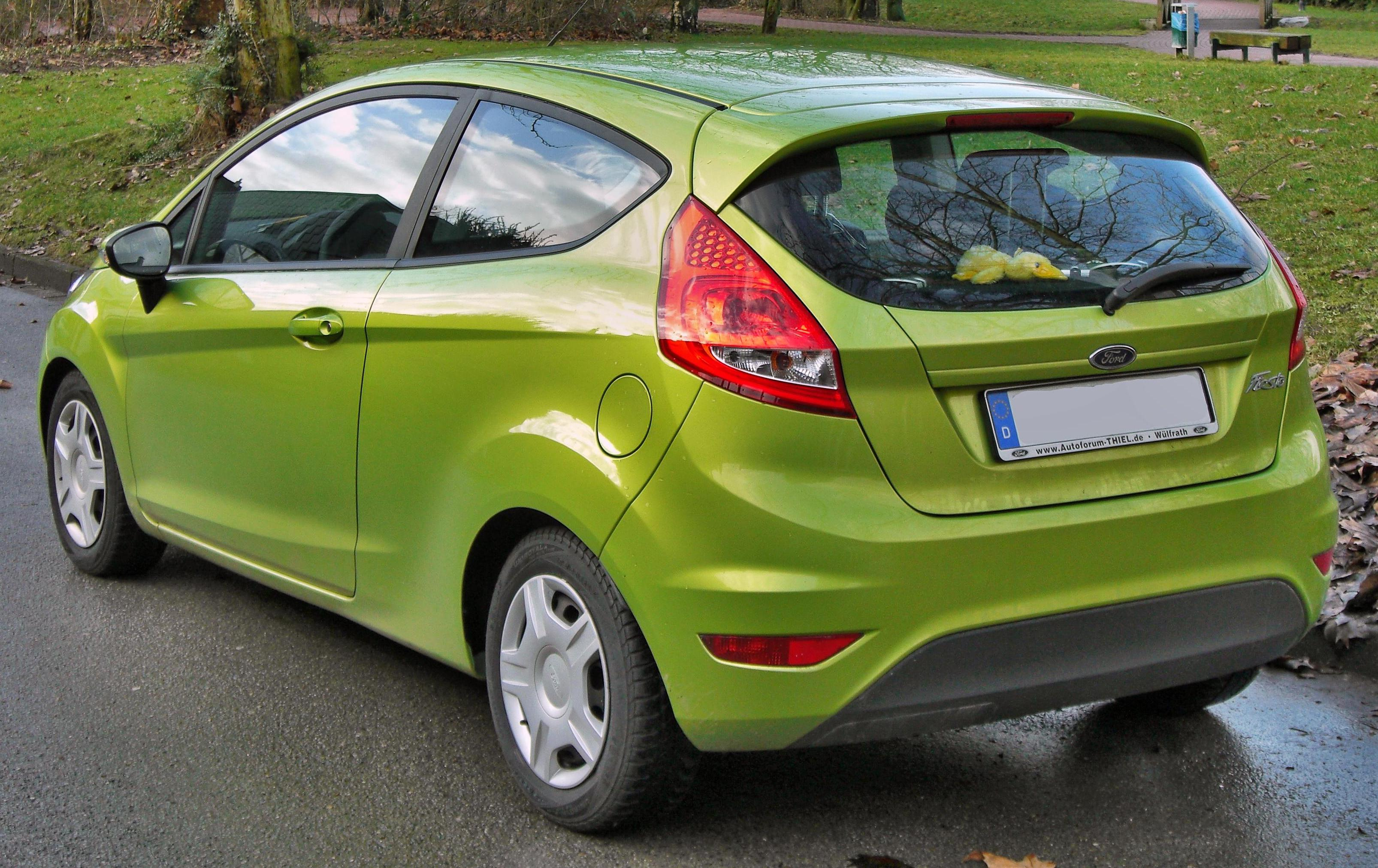
Ford Fiesta Trend 3-door hatchback (Germany; pre-facelift)

=== Van ===
The van version was sold only in Europe. It uses the same body shell as the three-door hatchback, modified with solid panels in place of the rear quarter windows and a flat load floor replacing the rear seats.

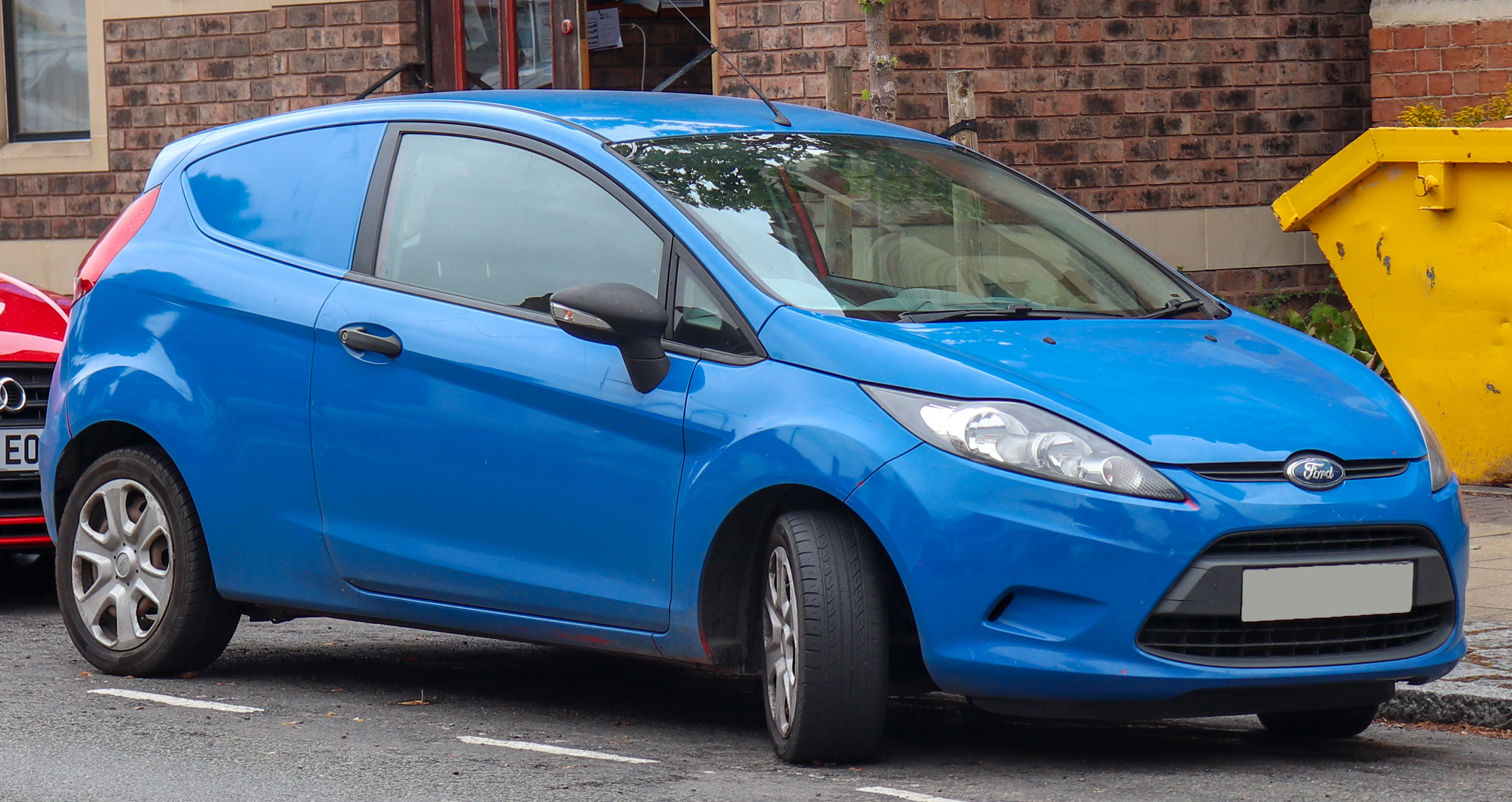
2009 Ford Fiesta Base 3-door van (pre-facelift; UK)

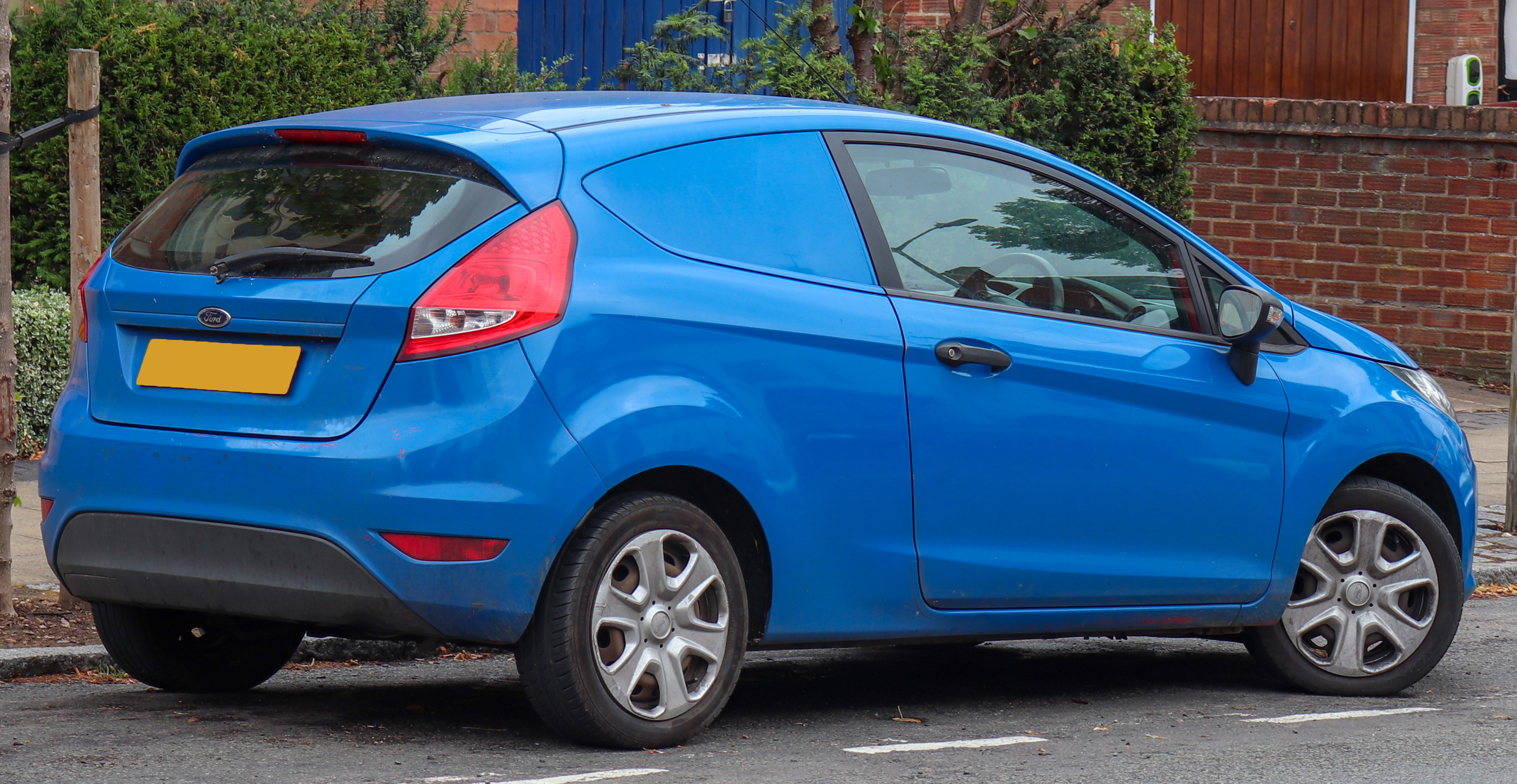
2009 Ford Fiesta Base 3-door van (pre-facelift; UK)

=== Sedan ===
A sedan version was launched in November 2008 at the Guangzhou Auto Show. It started sales the following year in China, and from 2010 it became available across Asia and North America. The four-door saloon model, while longer by almost 50 cm (19.7 in), retains the same wheelbase as the hatchback model. It was not marketed in Europe, but produced and marketed in Russia from 2015.

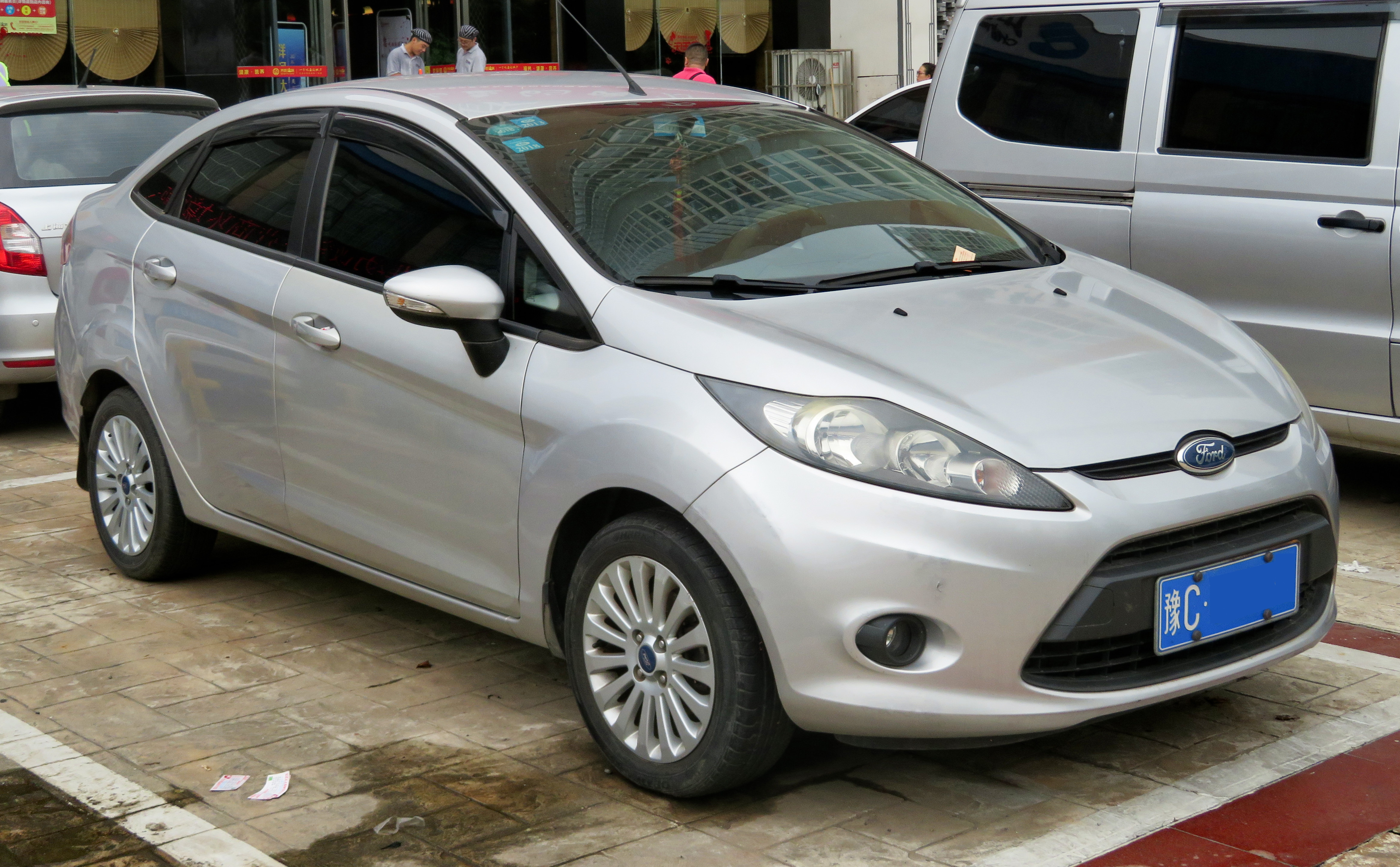
2010 Ford Fiesta sedan (China; pre-facelift)

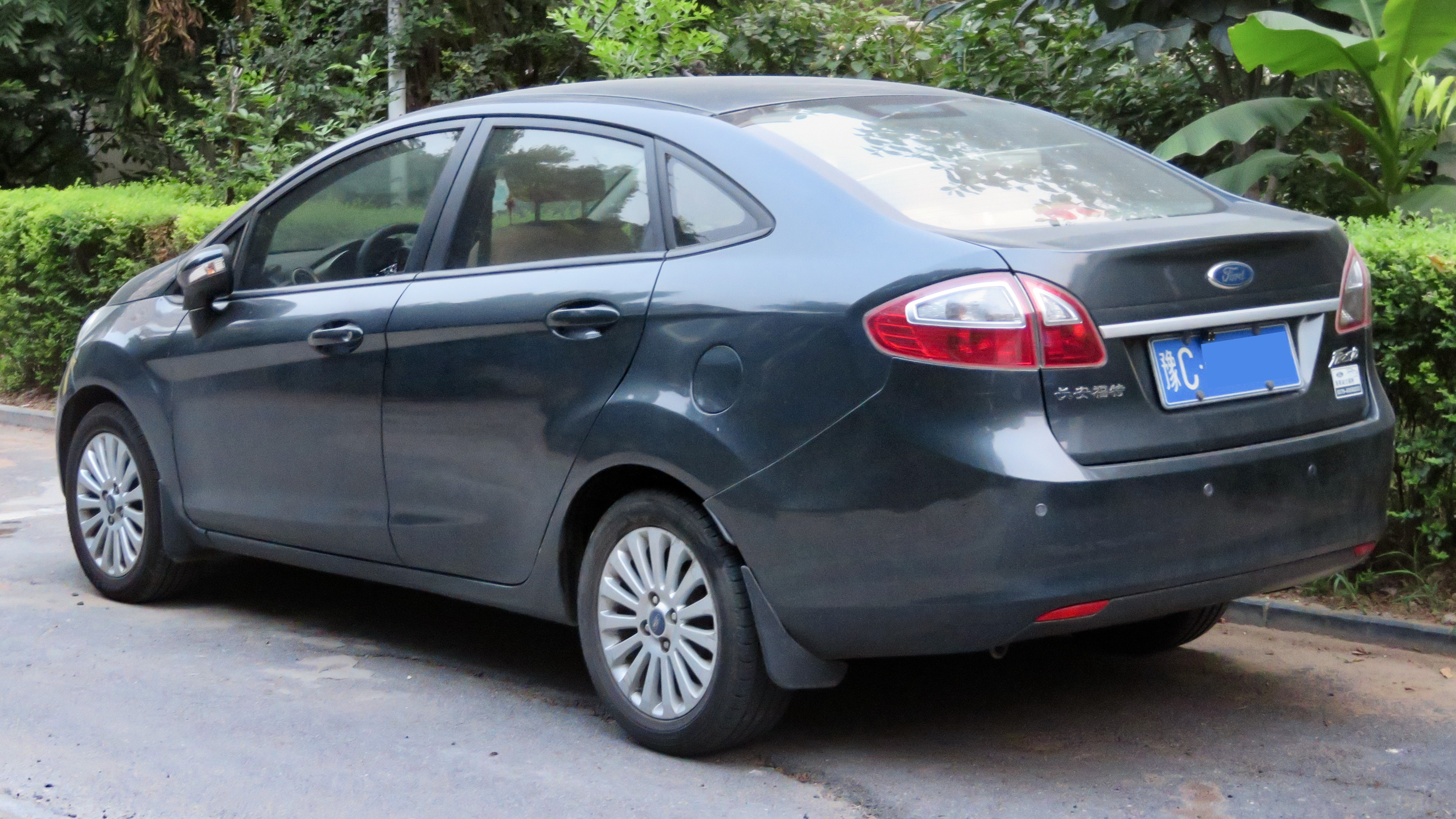
2010 Ford Fiesta sedan (China; pre-facelift)

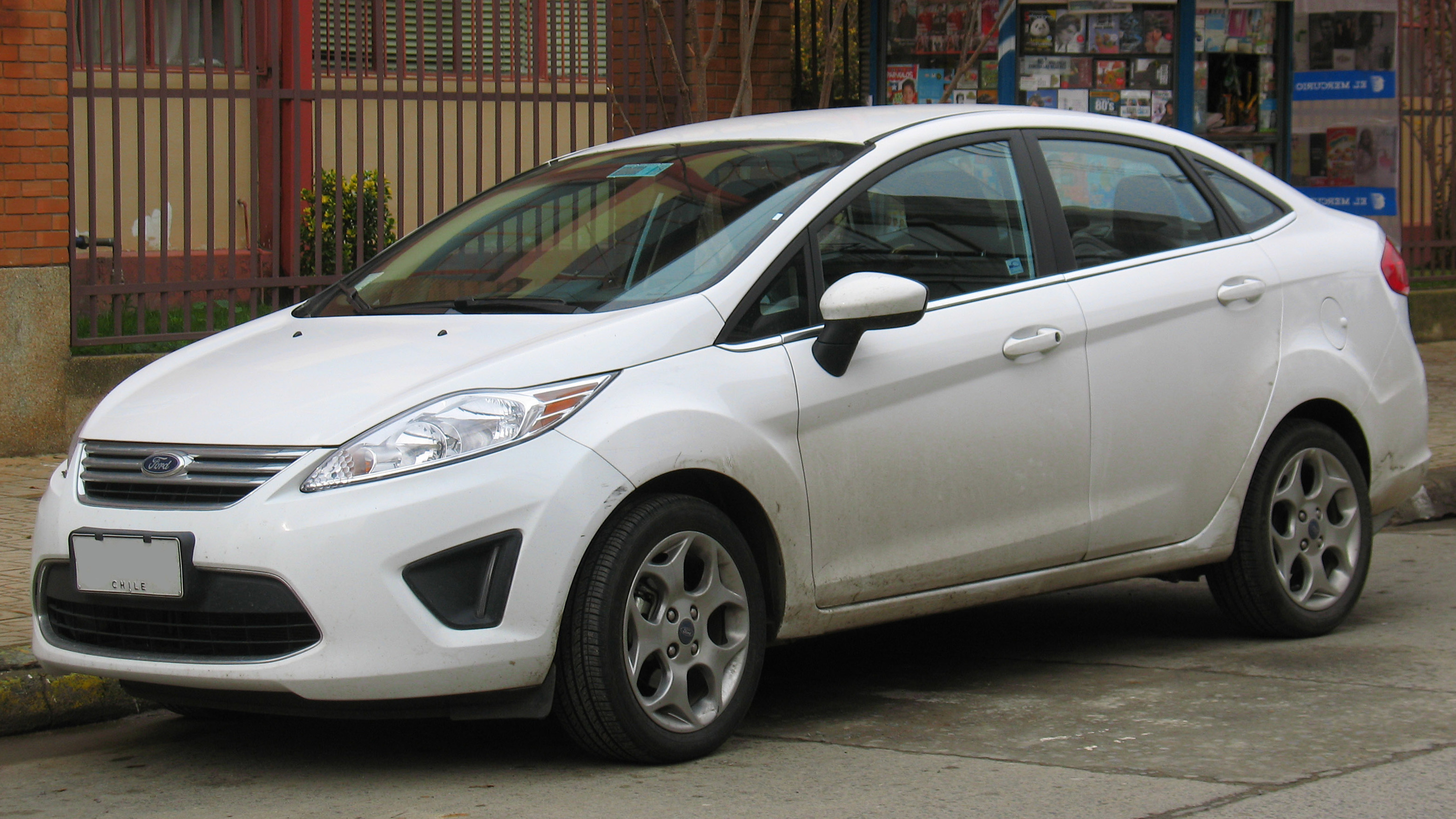
Ford Fiesta sedan (Chile; Americas-styling pre-facelift)

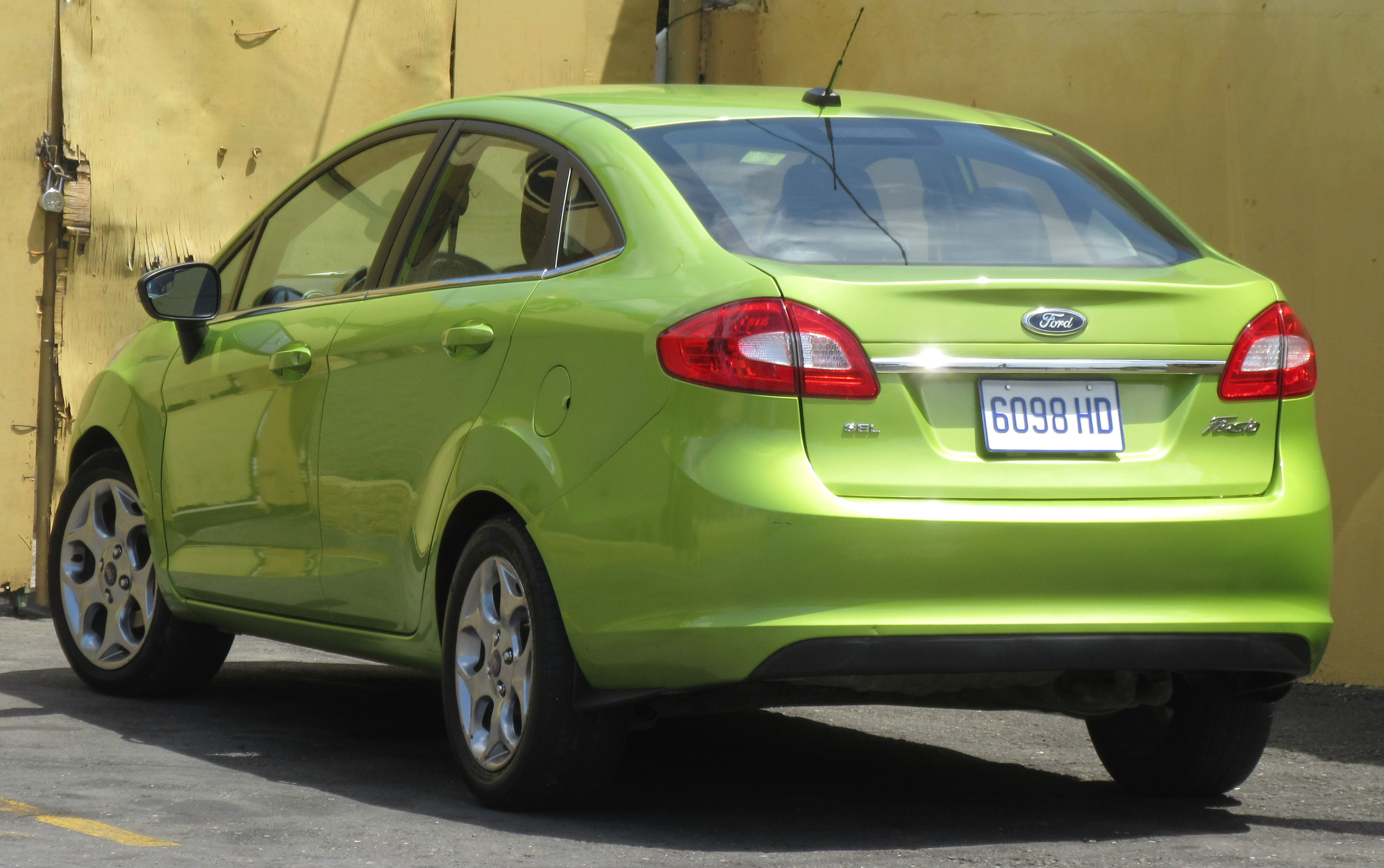
Ford Fiesta sedan (Jamaica; Americas-styling pre-facelift)

== Equipment ==
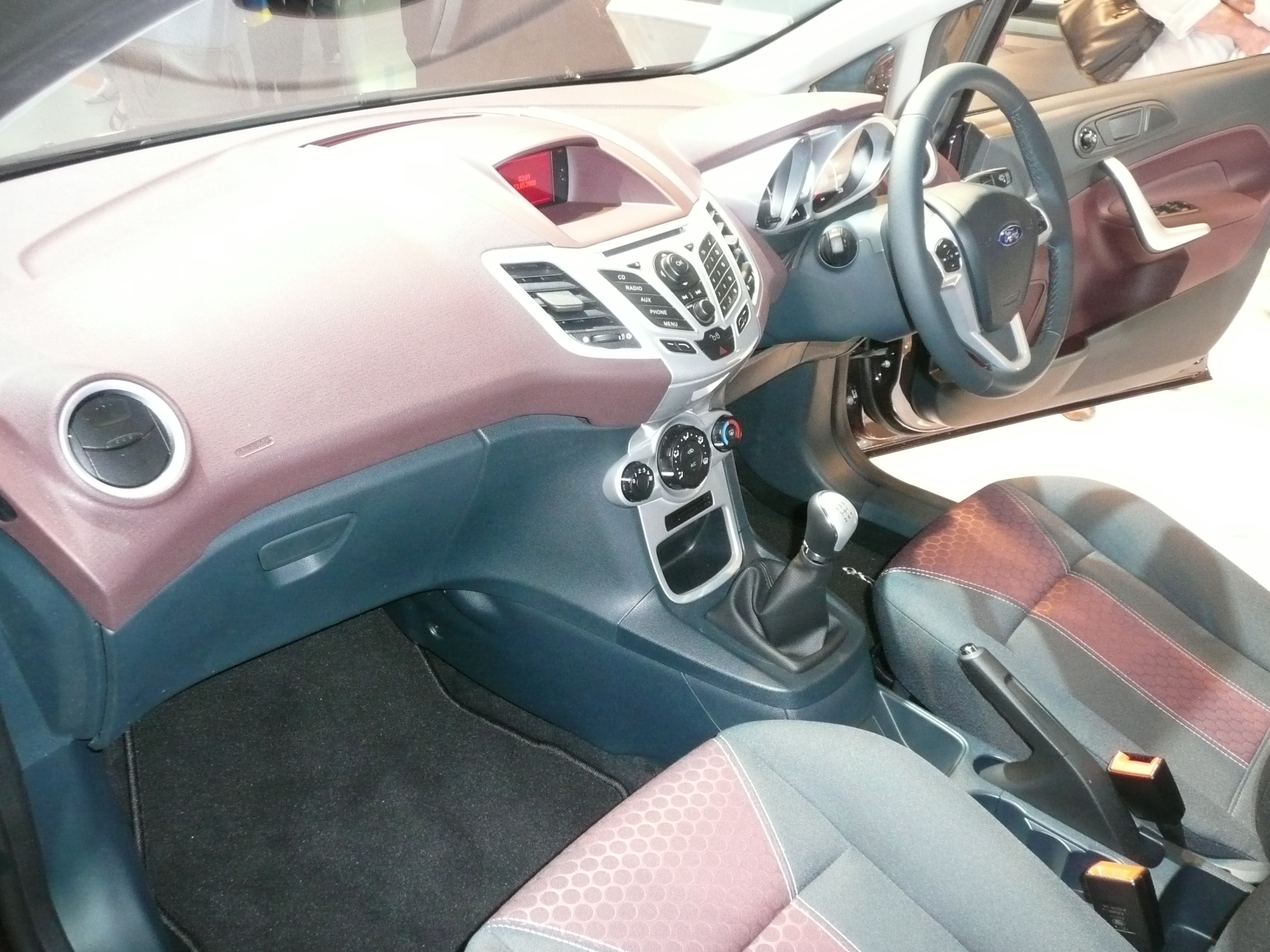
Interior

The Mk6 Fiesta includes Ford's Convers+ menu system, and complemented by steering wheel button controls. Ford initially anticipated that over 85% of Fiesta orders would include this multifunction display. Other new equipment includes keyless entry with a 'Ford Power' starter button, reach and rake adjustable steering wheel, electric power steering, and a USB port for portable music players. Ford Easyfuel, the capless refuelling system recently introduced with the Ford Mondeo, is also a feature, while 'ambient lighting,' casting a soft red glow over the interior, was an option. For the 2011 North American-market model, the Ford Sync in-car communications and entertainment system was available as an option.

== Facelift ==
=== First facelift (2012) ===
First introduced in Paris Motor Show in late September 2012, the facelifted Fiesta for the European market went on sale in 2013. It was the first to use Ford's latest corporate front end started which include the new trapezoidal grille, later used on other models including the Focus, Fusion and Mustang. Similar updates as the facelift-update in European market were introduced in the North American market as the 2014 model year. Luxurious equipment from the Focus and Mondeo was also made available on the facelifted Titanium X model. Engines in Europe were also changed, with the 1.0-litre EcoBoost from the Focus debuting, with 100 PS (74 kW; 99 bhp) and 125 PS (92 kW; 123 bhp), and a naturally aspirated version of the same engine producing 80 PS (59 kW; 79 bhp).

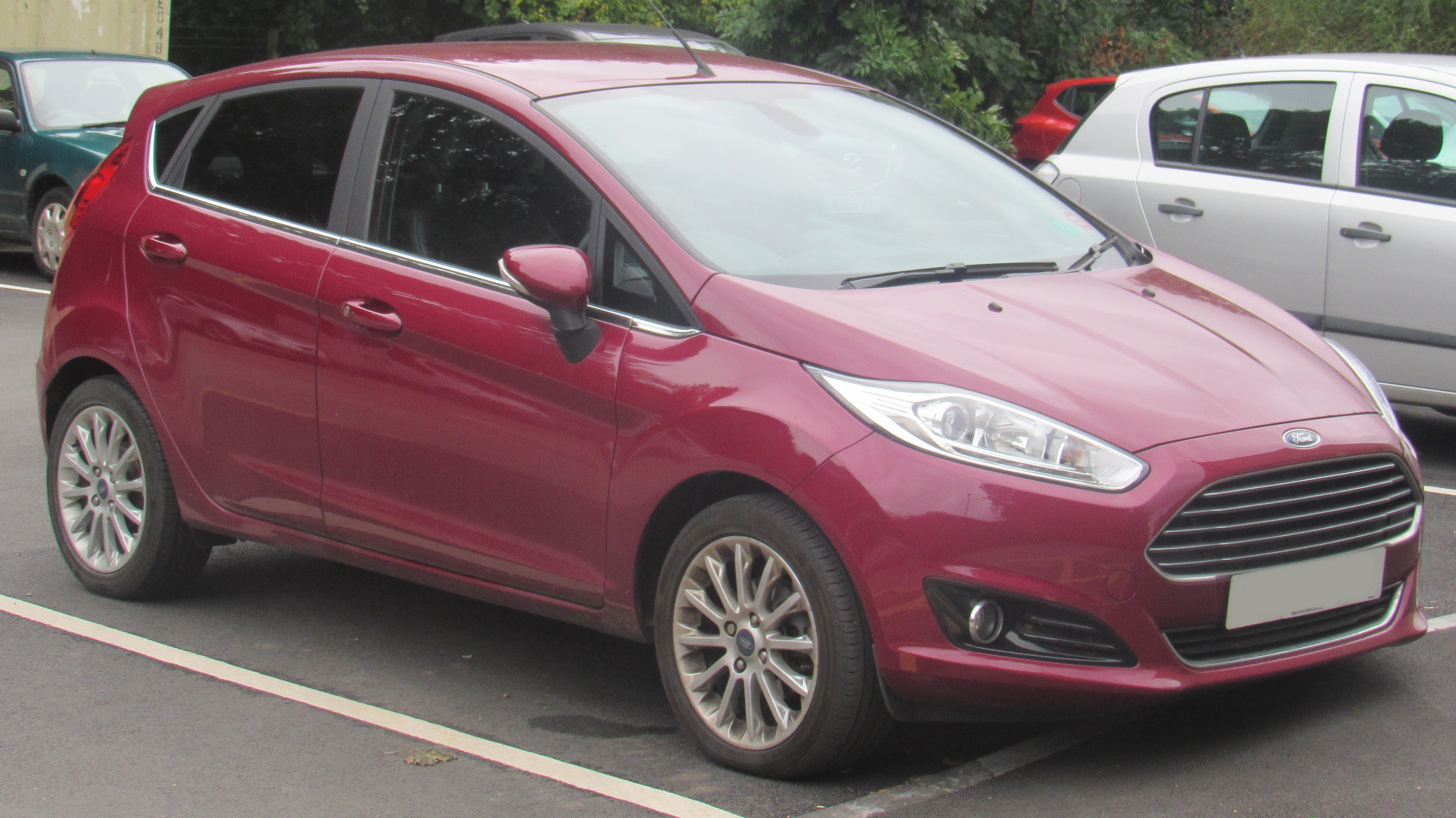
Ford Fiesta Titanium X 5-door hatchback (UK; facelift)

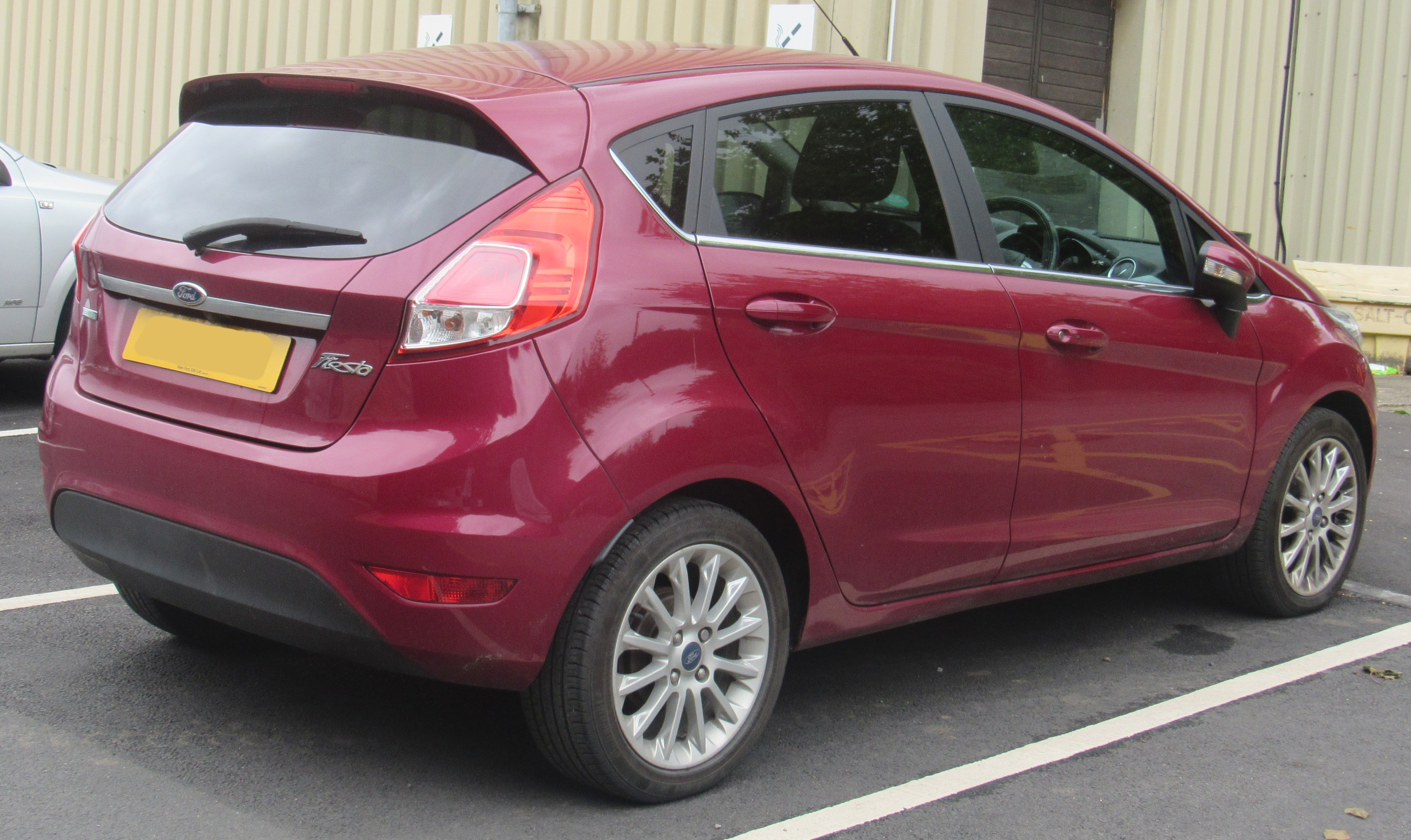
Ford Fiesta Titanium X 5-door hatchback (UK; facelift)

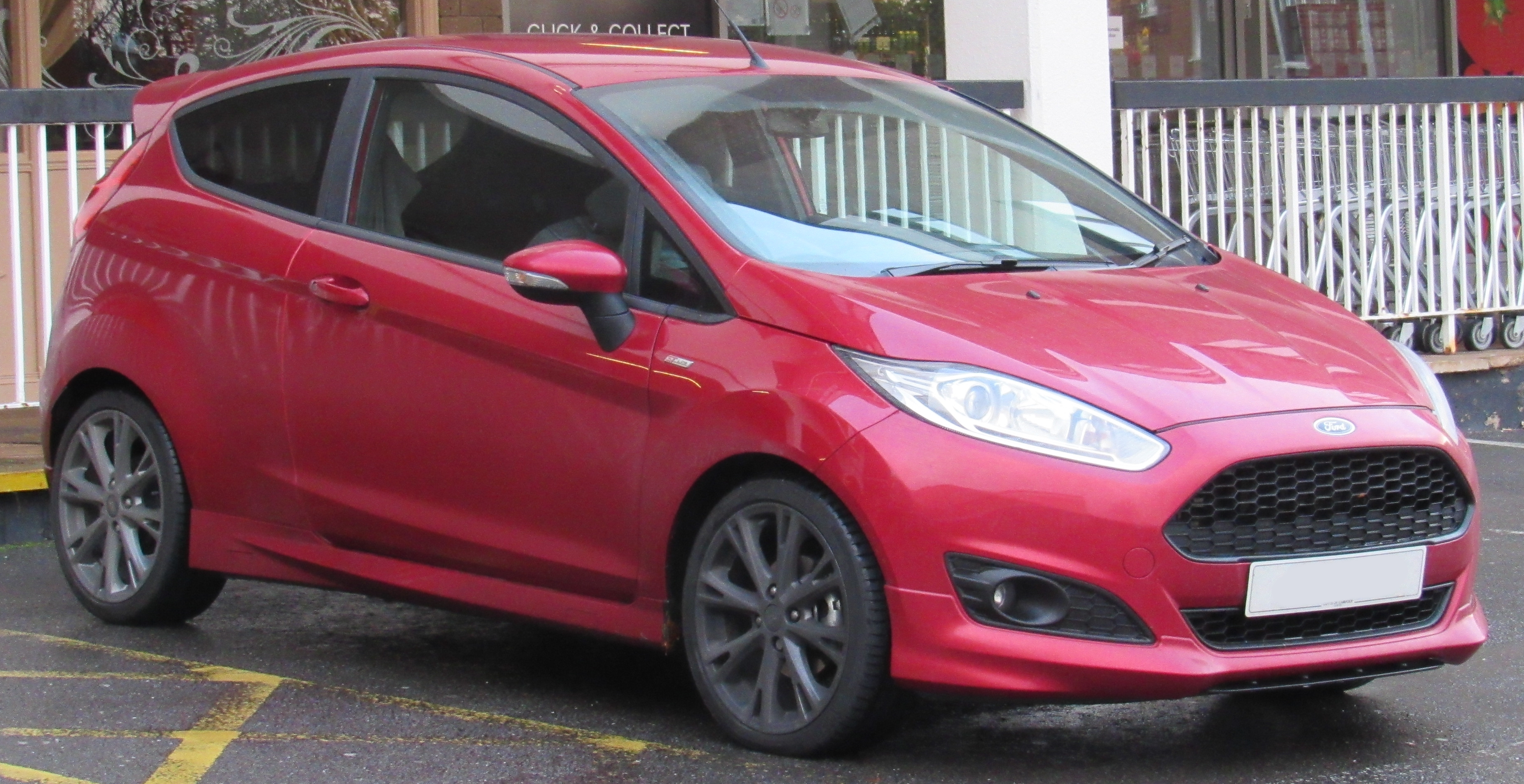
Ford Fiesta ST-Line 3-door hatchback (UK; facelift)

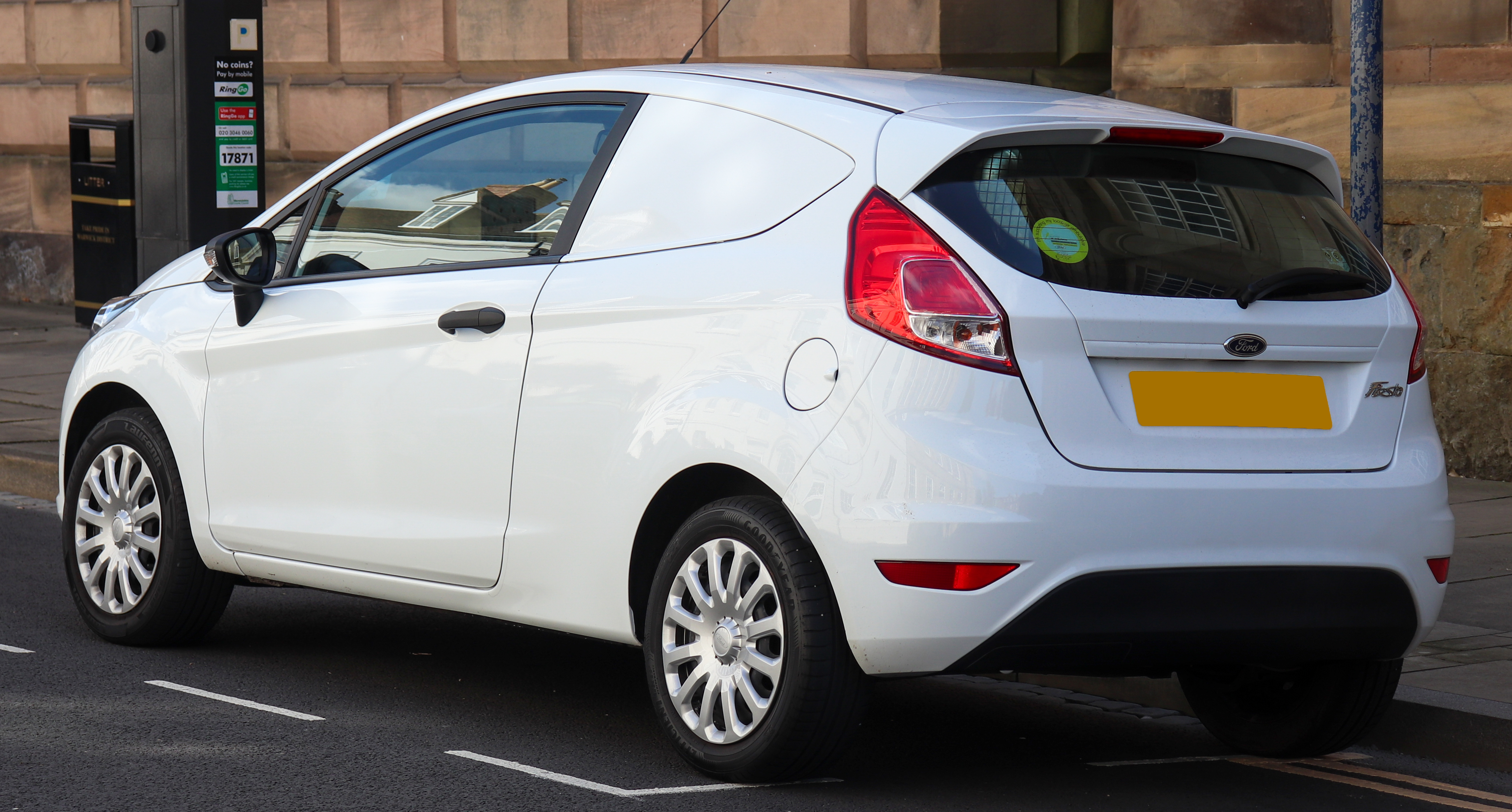
Ford Fiesta Base 3-door van (UK; facelift)

=== Second facelift (2017; South America) ===
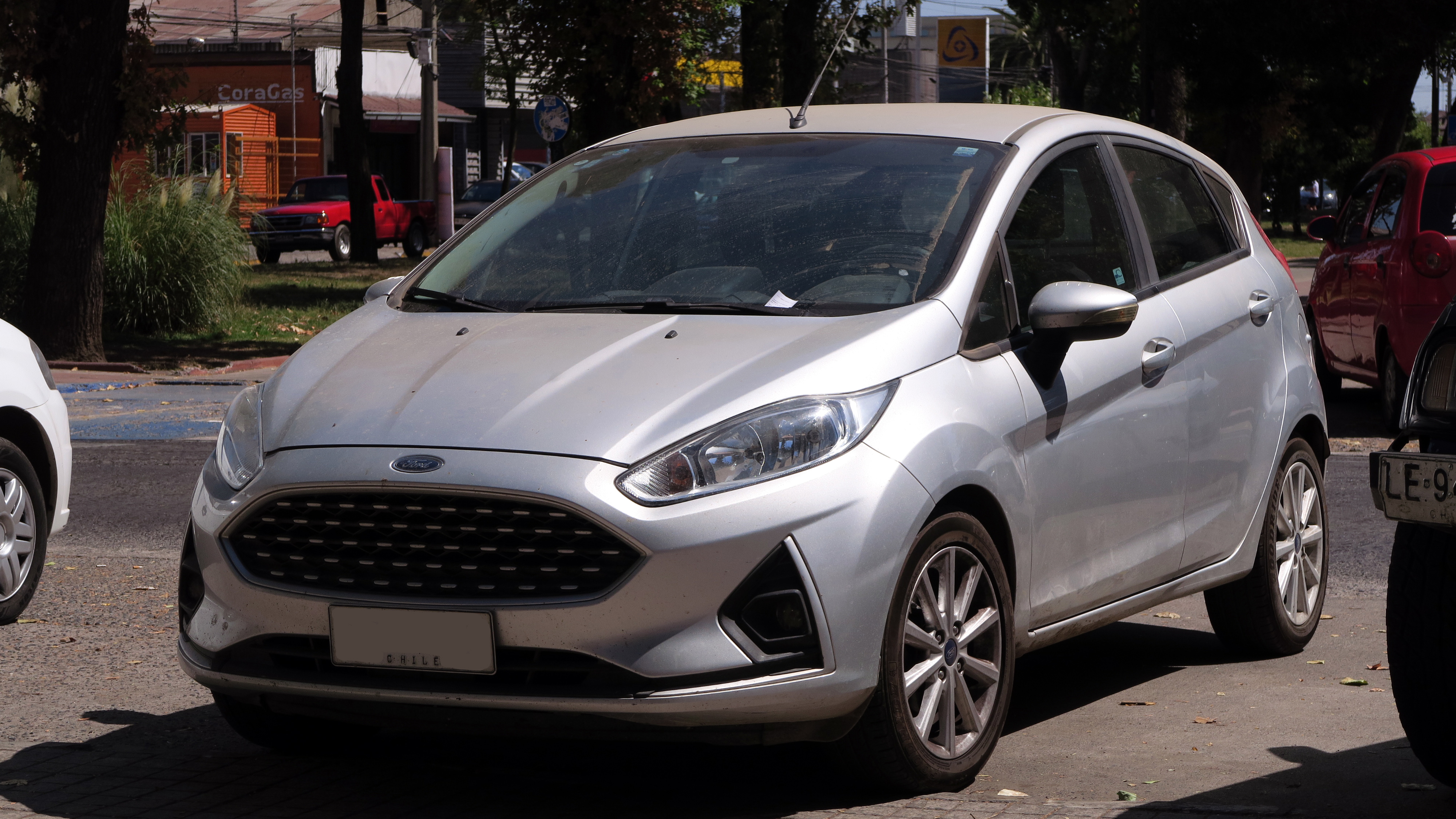
Ford Fiesta SE 5-door hatchback (Chile; second facelift)

As the seventh generation Fiesta was not offered in Latin America, Ford extended the production of the sixth-generation Fiesta in Brazil by introducing a second update in Brazil and other Mercosur markets in November 2017. For the first time, the Mercosur market Fiesta was offered with a 1.0-litre EcoBoost engine. It featured a new front bumper, new alloy wheels, new headlights and LED taillights. It is also equipped with the updated SYNC 3 infotainment system. The Fiesta production in Brazil ended in February 2019 without any direct replacement.

== Fiesta ST ==
In 2011, Ford revealed the Fiesta ST concept. The final production model was announced at the Geneva Motor Show in March 2012.

The Fiesta ST production model went on sale in both Europe and North America in 2013 alongside the facelifted model. In the North American market, the Fiesta ST became available in early 2013 for the 2014 model year, unveiled at the 2012 Los Angeles Auto Show as part of a larger mid-cycle refresh for the Fiesta.

The ST featured a redesigned front fascia similar to the one seen on the Focus ST, a large rear spoiler, aggressive rear diffuser with a dual exhaust system, completed with 17-inch wheels on Bridgestone Potenza tires. On the inside, the ST provided heavily bolstered Recaro front seats (optional in North America with partial leather, and available with either partial leather or cloth-only in other territories) and sportier decor; North American versions were offered with the MyFord Touch infotainment system.

The Fiesta ST is powered by a 1.6-litre Ford EcoBoost engine to deliver performance while it was said to provide good fuel efficiency. The 1.6-litre Ford EcoBoost turbocharged engine features Twin-independent Variable Camshaft Timing (Ti-VCT) and puts out 182 PS (134 kW; 180 hp) with 177 lb⋅ft (240 N⋅m) of torque, providing an acceleration time of under 7 seconds (0–100 km/h) and an electronically limited top speed of 137 mph (220 km/h). This engine features "overboost," allowing delivery of up to 200 PS (197 bhp; 147 kW) for a maximum of 15 seconds.

The North American Fiesta ST was offered as a five-door hatchback variant manufactured in Cuautitlán Izcalli, Mexico instead of the three-door hatchback offered in Europe, Asia and South Africa which was manufactured in Cologne, Germany. It includes a 1.6-litre EcoBoost four-cylinder engine, six-speed manual transmission, overall steering ratio of 13.6:1, increased roll stiffness at rear axle, 15 mm (0.6 in) lower body height than base model, electronic Torque Vectoring Control and 3-mode electronic stability control (standard, sport or off).

In the US, Ford was permitted to market the engine offering its overboost power figure; by contrast, in other countries such as the UK, a manufacturer is not permitted to market an engine's temporary output. The engine is mated to a 6-speed manual transmission which features Ford's Torque Vectoring Control system to brake the inside front wheel to aid agility, and has three ESP modes.

The Ford Fiesta ST won Top Gear's Car of the Year for 2013.

In 2016, Ford released the Fiesta ST200 limited edition in Europe. On the outside, it featured bespoke grey paint as the only colour available, and unique 17-inch black alloy wheels. Inside, it featured Recaro bucket seats and illuminated tread plates as standard. Power and torque were both increased. As the name suggests, power was up to 200 PS (147 kW), while torque was boosted to 290 N⋅m (214 lb⋅ft). The chassis remained the same, but torque vectoring (powered by braking the inside wheels rather than an active differential) helped to reduce understeer whilst cornering. As a result of the increase in power and also to a shorter final drive ratio, 0–62 mph (0–100 km/h) was reduced to 6.7 seconds.

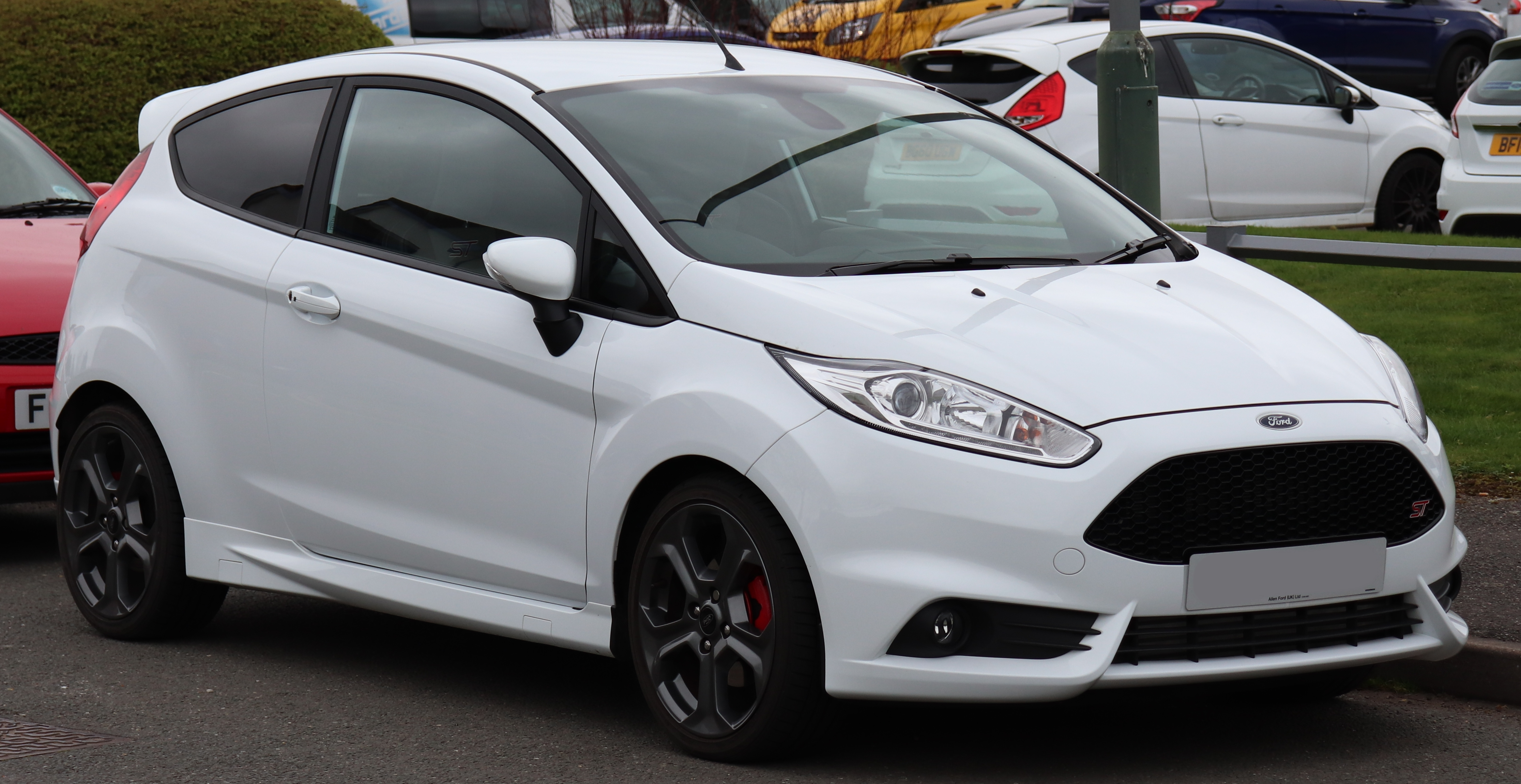
Ford Fiesta ST 3-door (UK)

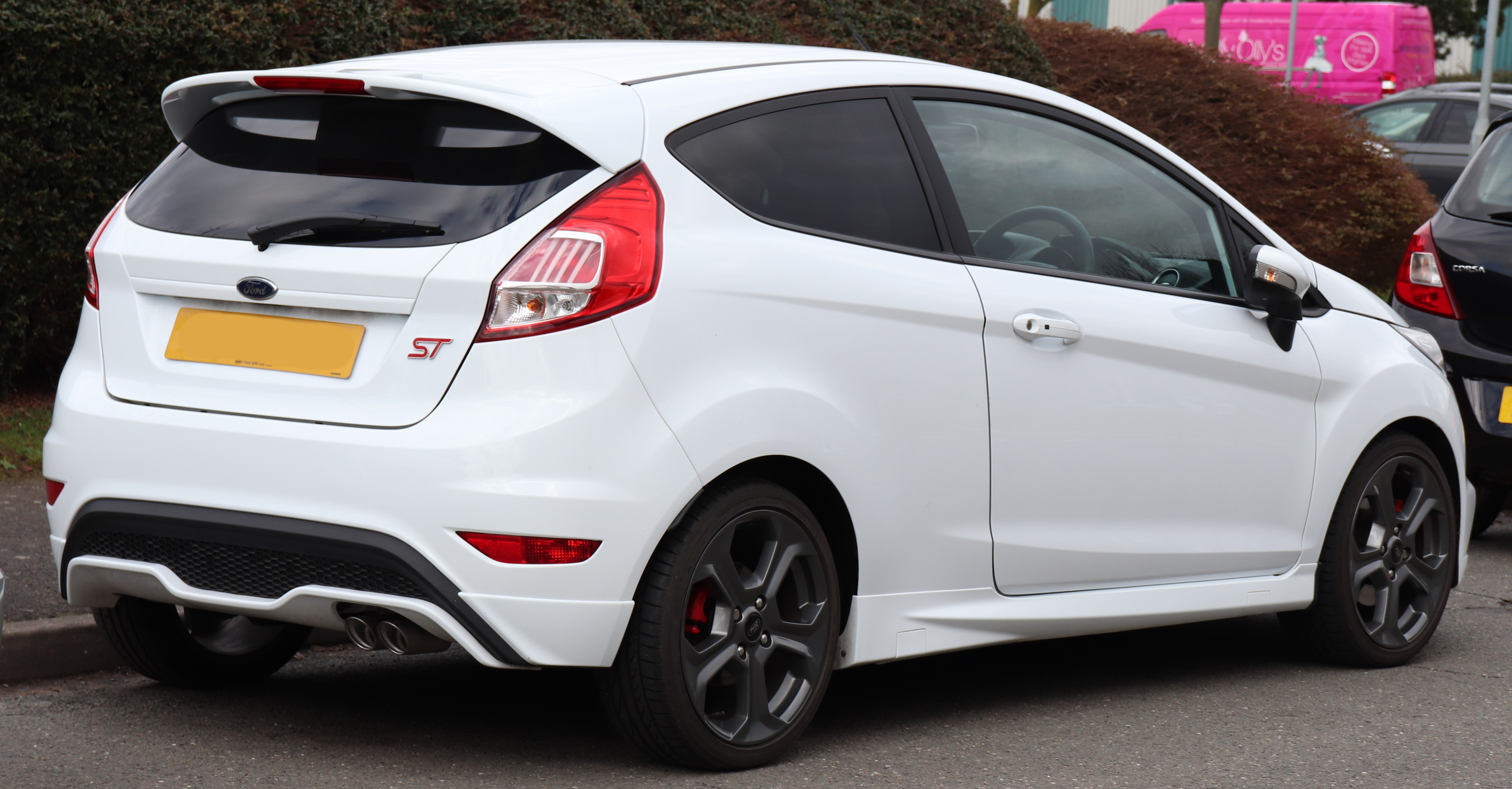
Ford Fiesta ST (UK)

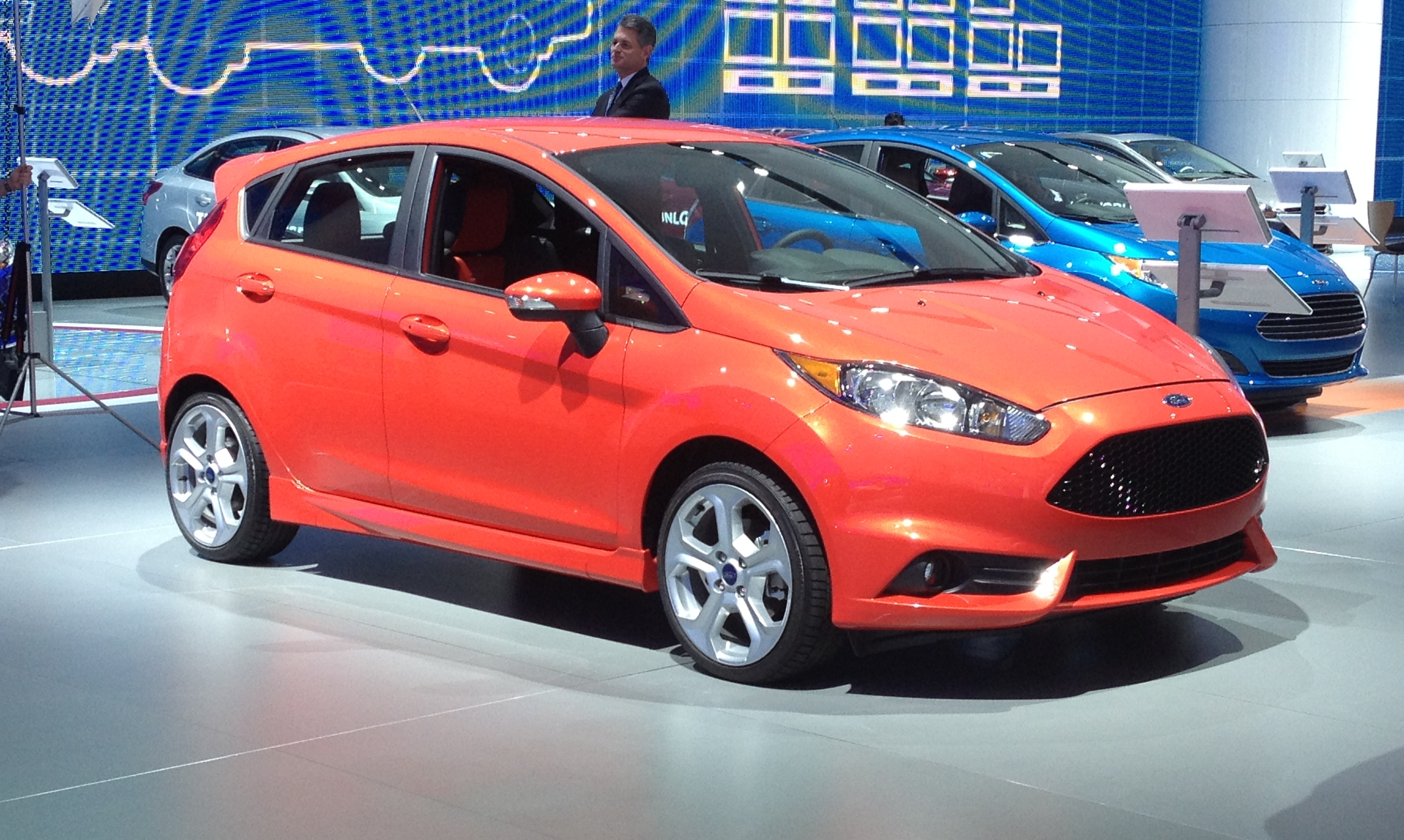
Ford Fiesta ST 5-door (US)

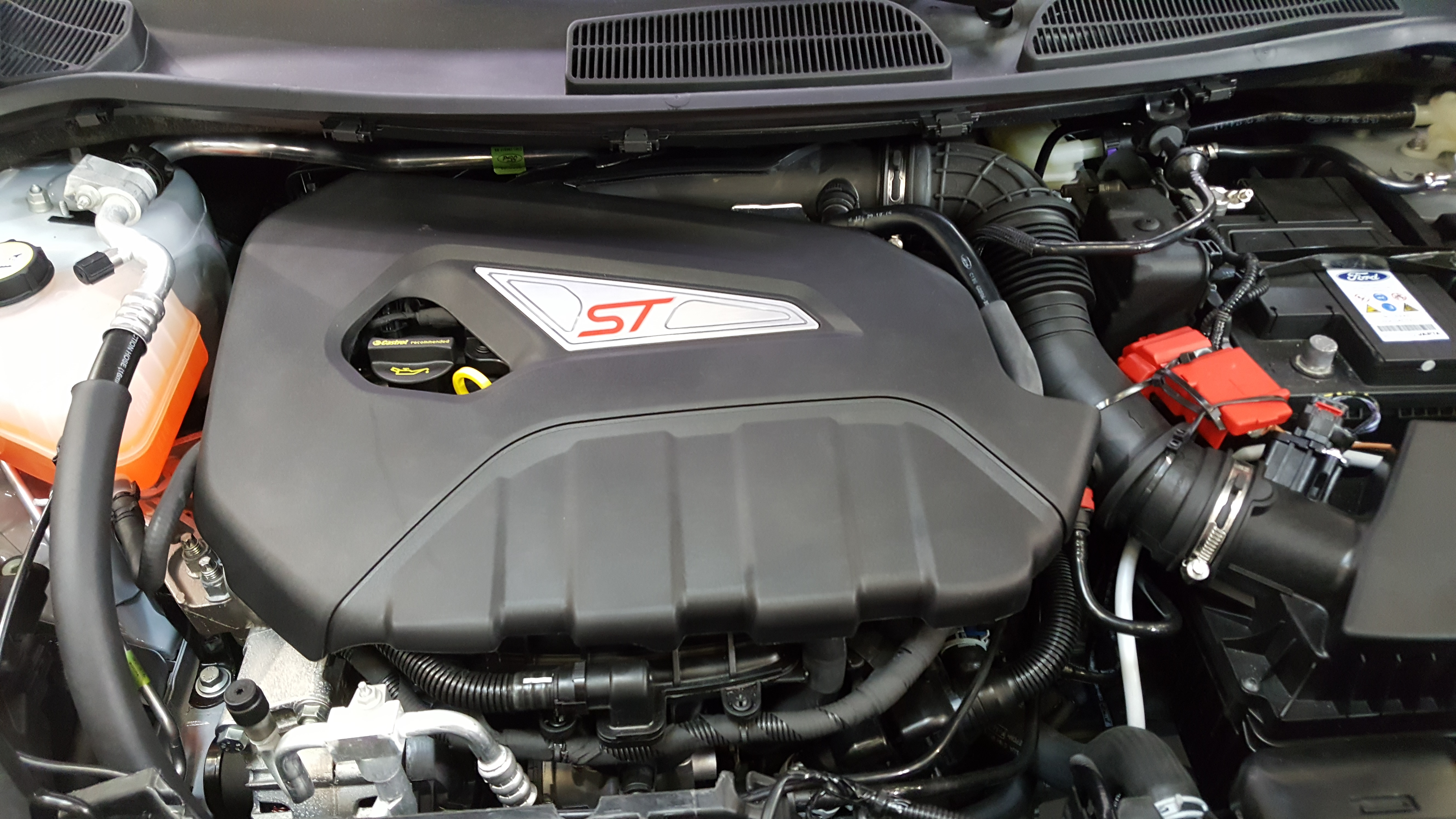
The engine of the limited edition Fiesta ST200

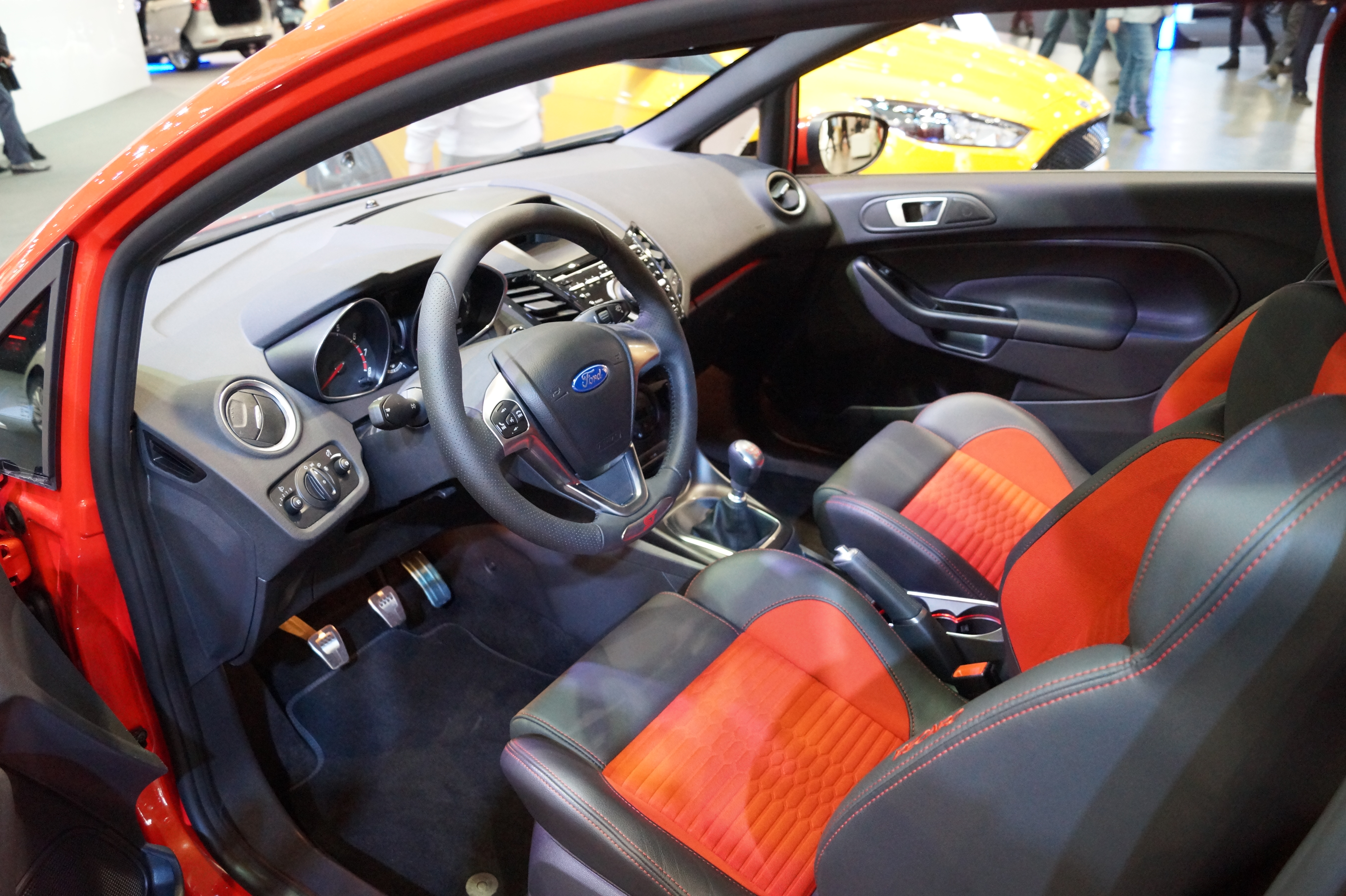
Interior

== Fiesta ECOnetic ==
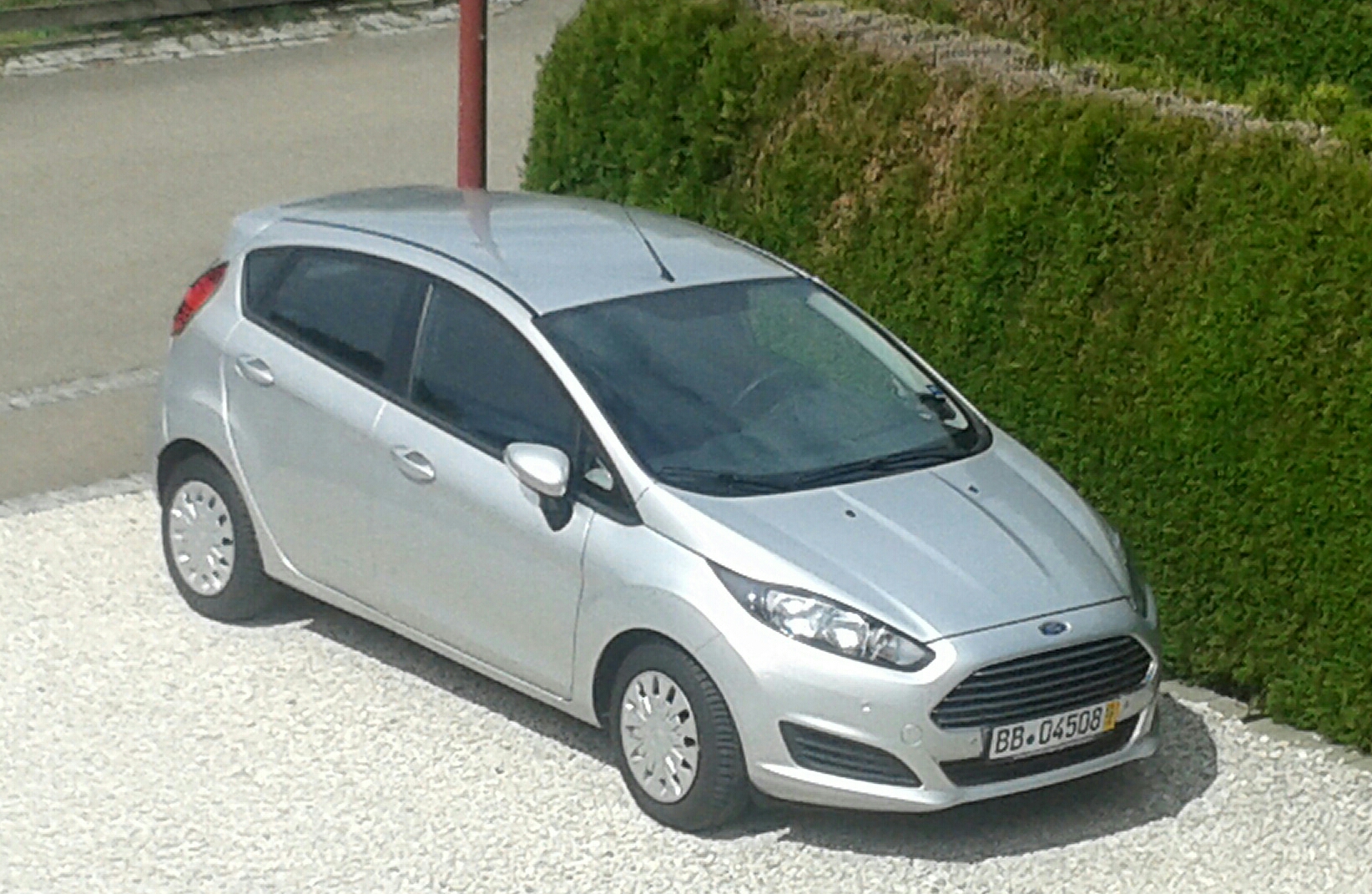
Ford Fiesta ECOnetic (Europe)

In 2008, Ford revealed details of an ECOnetic model, which Ford stated would emit 98 g/km of carbon dioxide. The car was launched in 2009. It uses the 1.6-litre Duratorq TDCi diesel engine, but with an added diesel particulate filter. The Fiesta ECOnetic achieves its environmental credentials through weight loss and aerodynamic adjustments, and its emission figure exempted the car from UK vehicle excise duty. The ECOnetic gets an estimated fuel consumption of 65 mpg_{‑US} (3.6 L/100 km; 78 mpg_{‑imp}). When tested on the highway mileage and emissions test schedules, on which hybrids are designed to perform well, the ECOnetic outperforms the Toyota Prius.

The model was not available in the US because, as Business Week noted, the company "doesn't believe it could charge enough to make money on an imported ECOnetic" and did not think it would sell enough of the model (350,000/year) to justify the $350 million in upgrades required at their Mexico plant to manufacture it in North America.

== North America ==
Unveiled at the 2009 Los Angeles Auto Show in December, the sixth generation subcompact Fiesta was available in North America as a four-door sedan and five-door hatchback, with manual transmission or Ford's dual clutch automatic transmission. All models are manufactured at Ford's Cuautitlán Assembly Plant. Fiesta sales for Canada began in June 2010 for the 2011 model year. Sales for the 5-door hatchback variant in Mexico started in 2011. Production ended on 19 August 2019.

The North American Fiesta features a redesigned front end and rear bumper compared to the European version, to match the reworked frame underneath in order to meet US crash standards. The sedan version is equipped with Ford of North America's trademark 'three-bar' chrome grille, while the hatchback model received a different grille design with body colour treatment. The styling is also used for Latin American models. Other changes include stiffer springs to make up for the added weight, and some fine-tuning to adapt the car to American driver-friendly all-season tires.

Production of Ford Fiesta for the North American market started in May 2010. Ford planned to have cars available for sale soon after. On June 18, 2010, it was reported that although dealers took deposits from over 2,000 customers for Fiesta and placed large orders as the car was heavily marketed, dealers and customers had not received cars that they expected to have arrived weeks ago in May. In July, Ford said initial shipments were delayed for up to two weeks by Hurricane Alex that hit Northern Mexico in late June, and subsequently by Tropical Storm Bonnie. As a result of the delays, Ford sent out US$50 gift certificates. By August 2010, Ford delayed some shipments because of a "quality problem". Ford claimed the issue was fixed and it was unlikely cars with defective parts would reach customers.

Ford dealers in the US offer optional laminated vinyl graphics applied to the car's exterior, expected to last 3 to 5 years before replacement. Also, certain dealers partaking in a new Ford Retail program provide an "unwrapping" digital package loaded with a photograph of the buyer taking delivery of his/her new car. A 19-minute audio description of the car and its features is included, which can be played on the way home, then loaded along with its interactive program into the home computer via its USB connection.

As of February 2014, the 2014 Fiesta ranked number one among Affordable Subcompact Cars according to U.S. News & World Report.

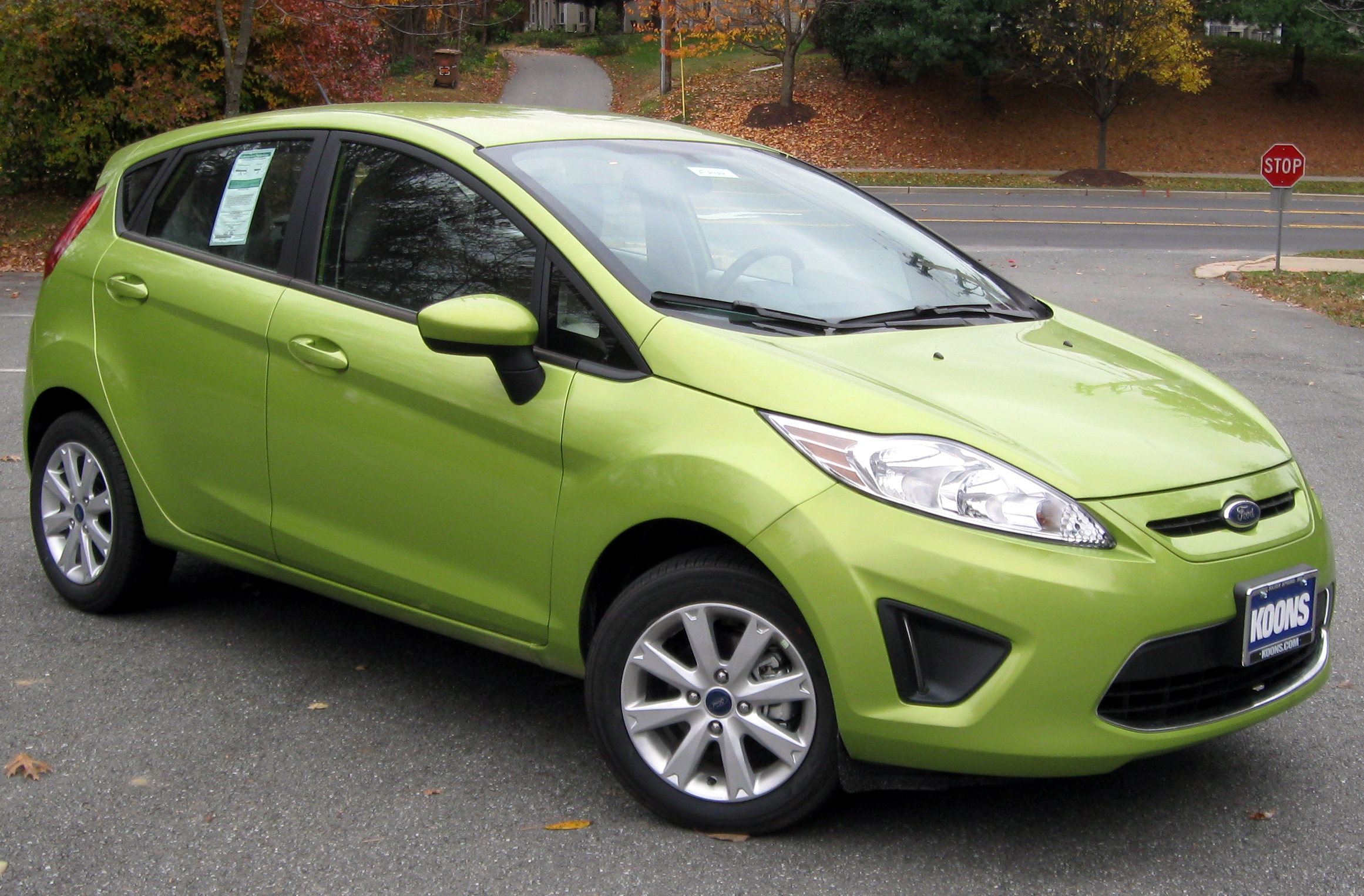
2012 Ford Fiesta SE hatchback (US)

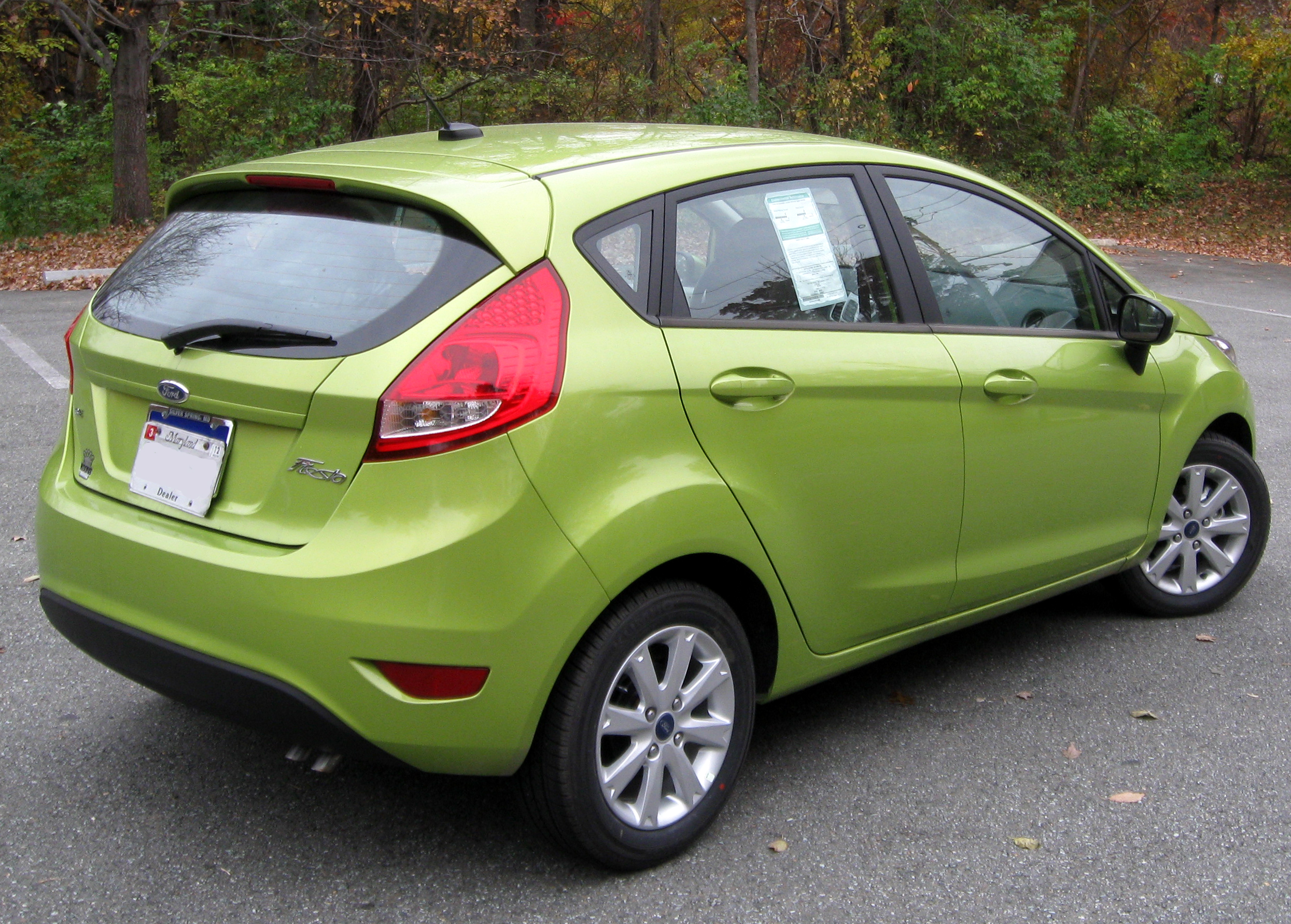
2012 Ford Fiesta SE hatchback (US)

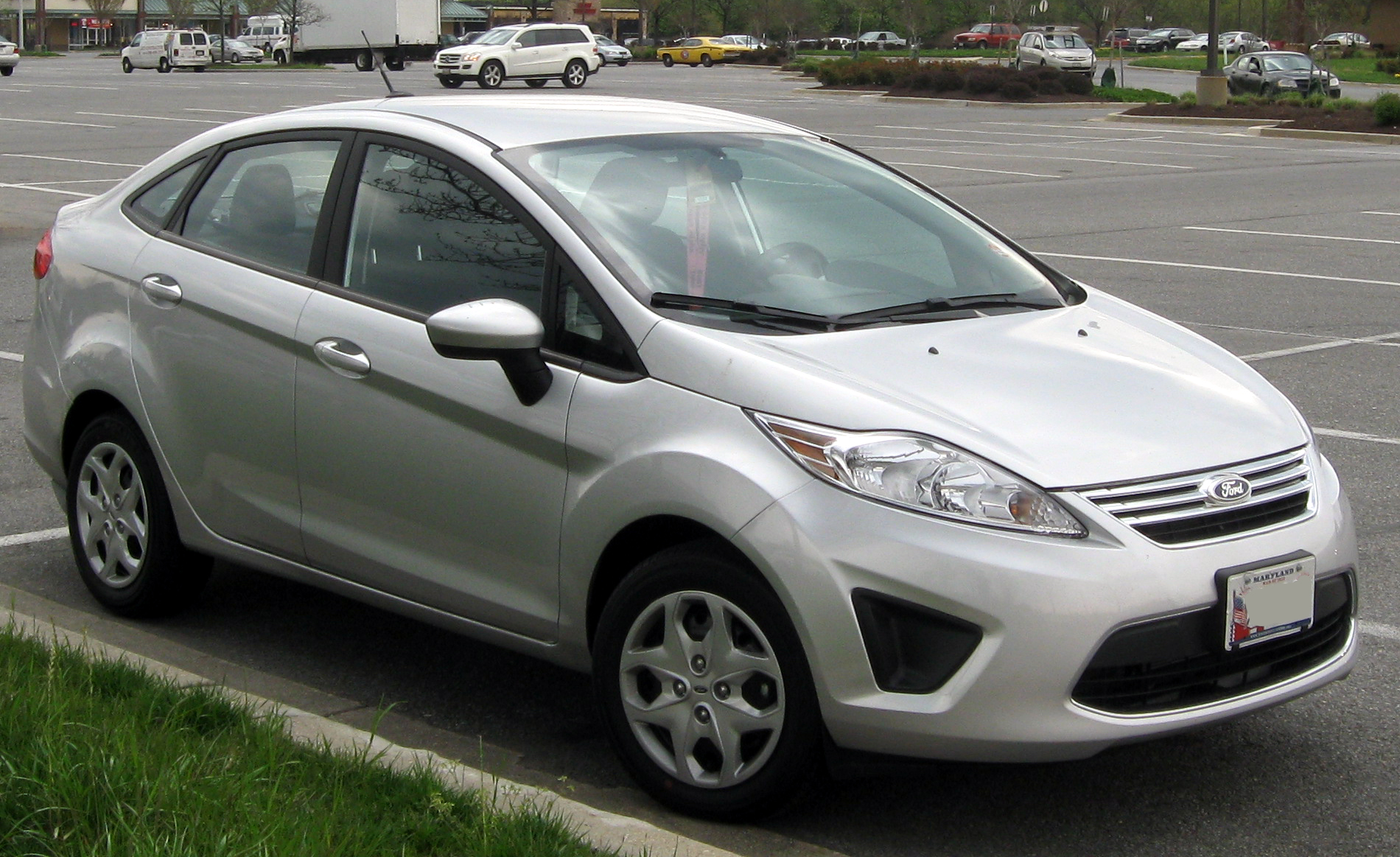
2011 Ford Fiesta S sedan (US)

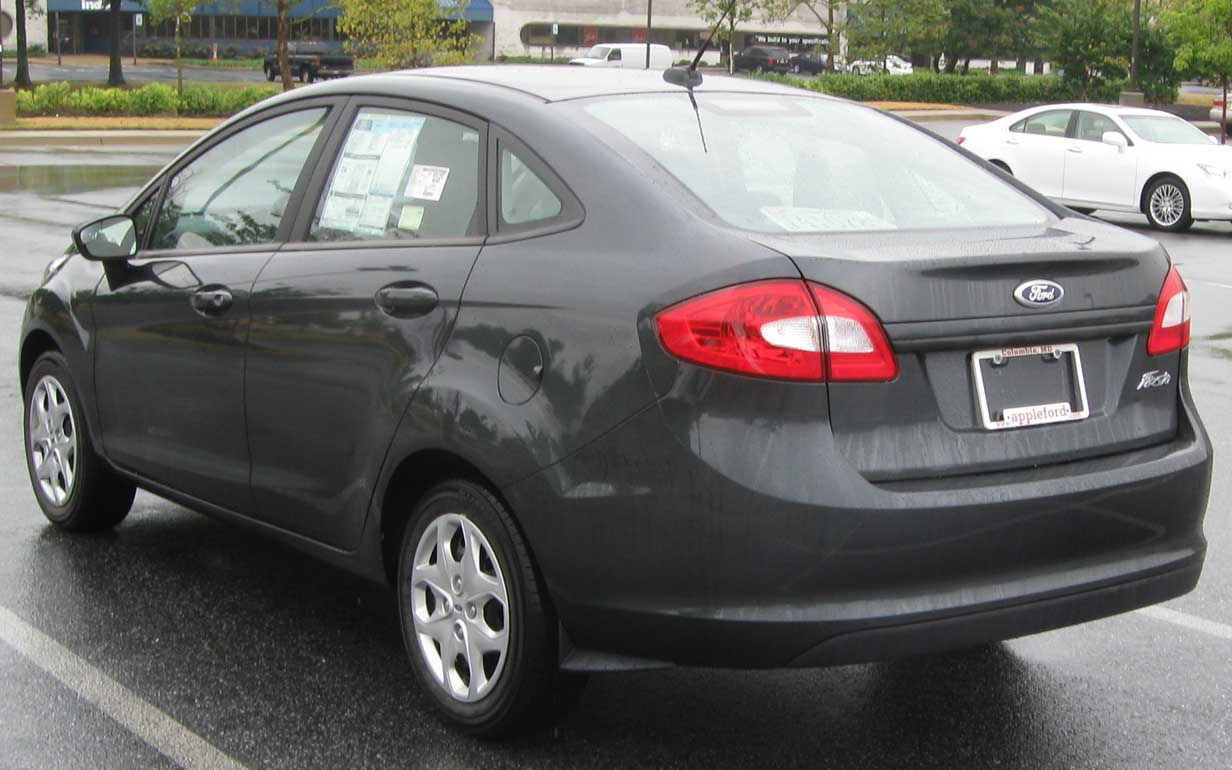
2011 Ford Fiesta S sedan (US)

=== Preliminary marketing ===
For the North American Fiesta, Ford initiated a marketing campaign in early 2009 called the Fiesta Movement, distributing examples of European Fiestas to applicants across the United States—to have the test drivers use popular Internet sites to share their experiences. Subsequently, Ford brought the cars to public venues nationwide to offer 100,000 test drives over eight months. One such event was offering free shuttle service in Chicago from a site near the Union Station commuter rail terminal to the Taste of Chicago event in Grant Park the week starting June 29, 2009. Late in July, six European Fiestas arrived in Halifax, Nova Scotia, to begin a similar demonstration tour across Canada.

Following on the success of Fiesta Movement, Ford initiated Fiesta Movement 2 in December 2009 by calling for video applications to be submitted by the end of January 2010 for activities to begin mid-February.

In March 2010, Ford worked with the television series American Idol to promote the Ford Fiesta in North America. Working with Ford designers, the final 12 contestants of the show created their own custom graphics on a Ford Fiesta, which were subsequently revealed on the show with fans given the chance to win one of the personalised cars.

=== Trim levels ===
In North America, the Fiesta is available in several trim levels, which are base S, SE, SES, SEL, Titanium, and ST performance model. It was offered in hatchback and sedan body styles.

=== Running changes ===
For the start of the 2012 model year, two new premium leather trim options and a sport exterior appearance package were made available for SES/SEL models, while several new colors were added for all models. At midyear, the hatchback became available in the previously saloon-only S trim level; as it includes a rear wiper and the same body color one-slot grille as fancier models, externally only badging and a limited choice of colors distinguish it from the SE. For 2013 option packages have been simplified and a Titanium trim level replaces the former SES/SEL.

=== 2014 model year update ===
The facelifted models from the European market were brought to the North American market as the 2014 model year refresh. The 2014 Ford Fiesta features redesigned front and rear fascias, whereas the previous models in North American market do not have the trapezoidal grille. As the result, the Fiesta ditched the American-specific fascia, opting to use the global styling, although its bumpers are not identical to the global version as it is specifically designed to meet US crash standards. The SFE package, based on the SE model includes a 1.0-litre three-cylinder EcoBoost engine.

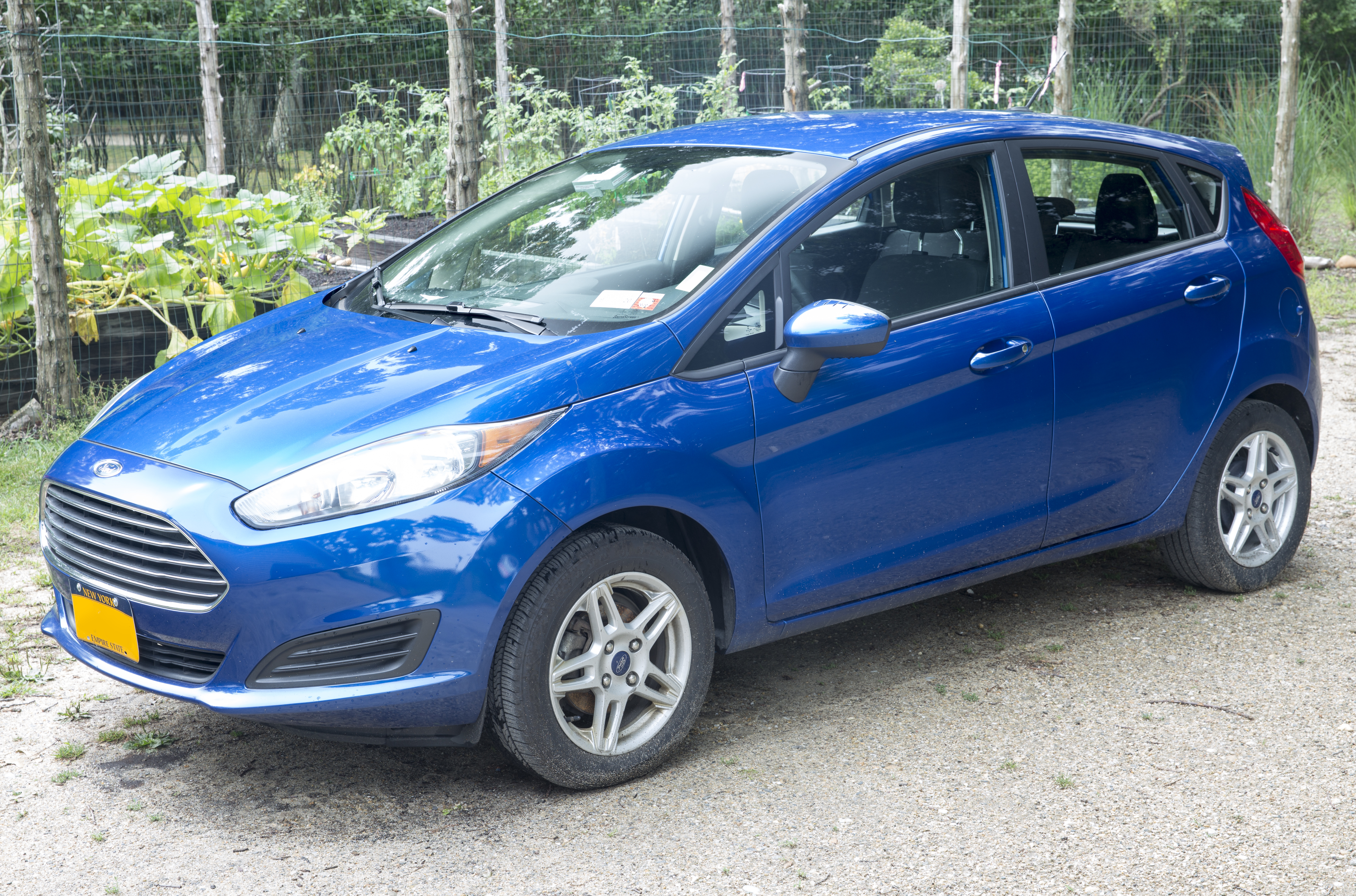
2018 Ford Fiesta SE hatchback

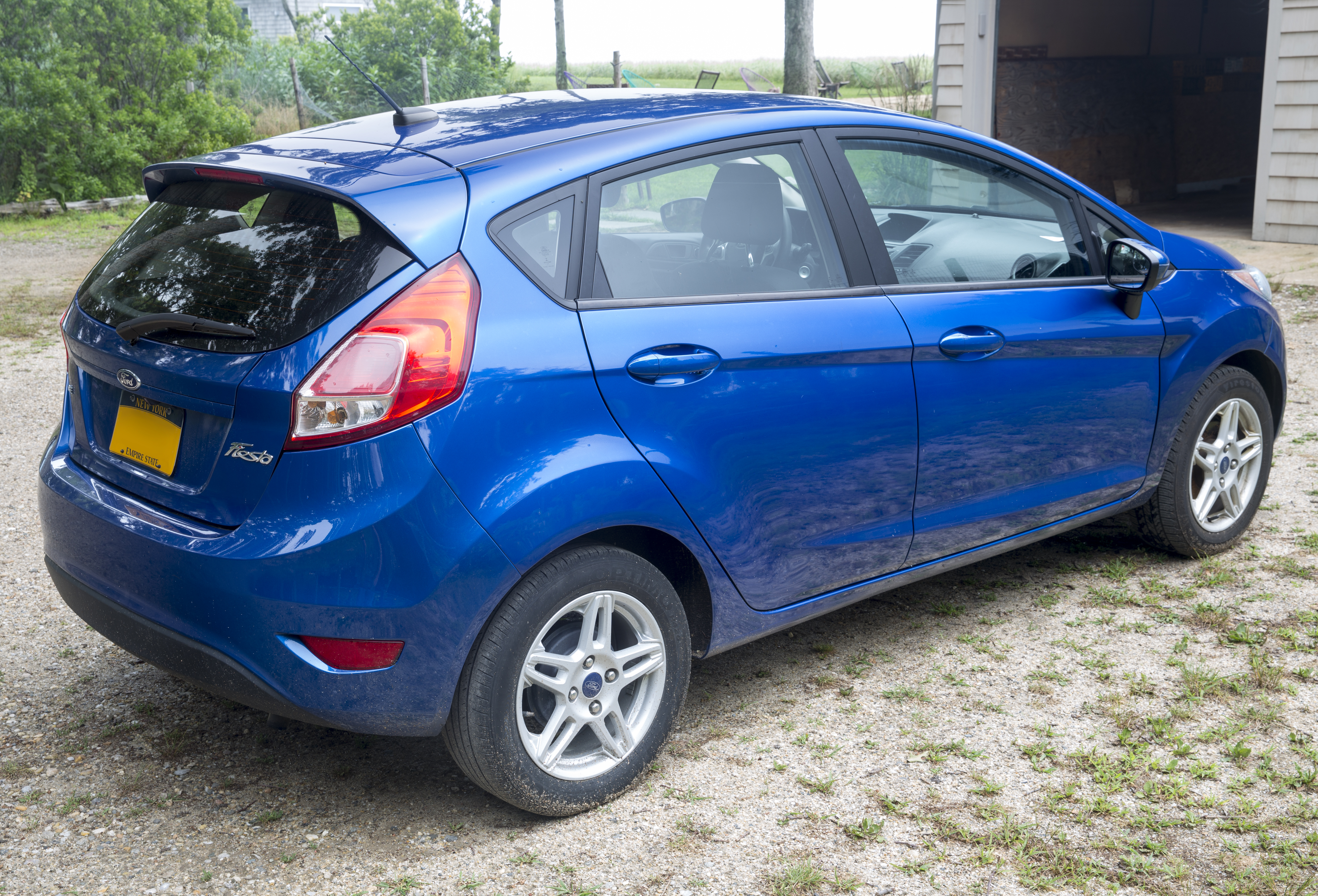
2018 Ford Fiesta SE hatchback

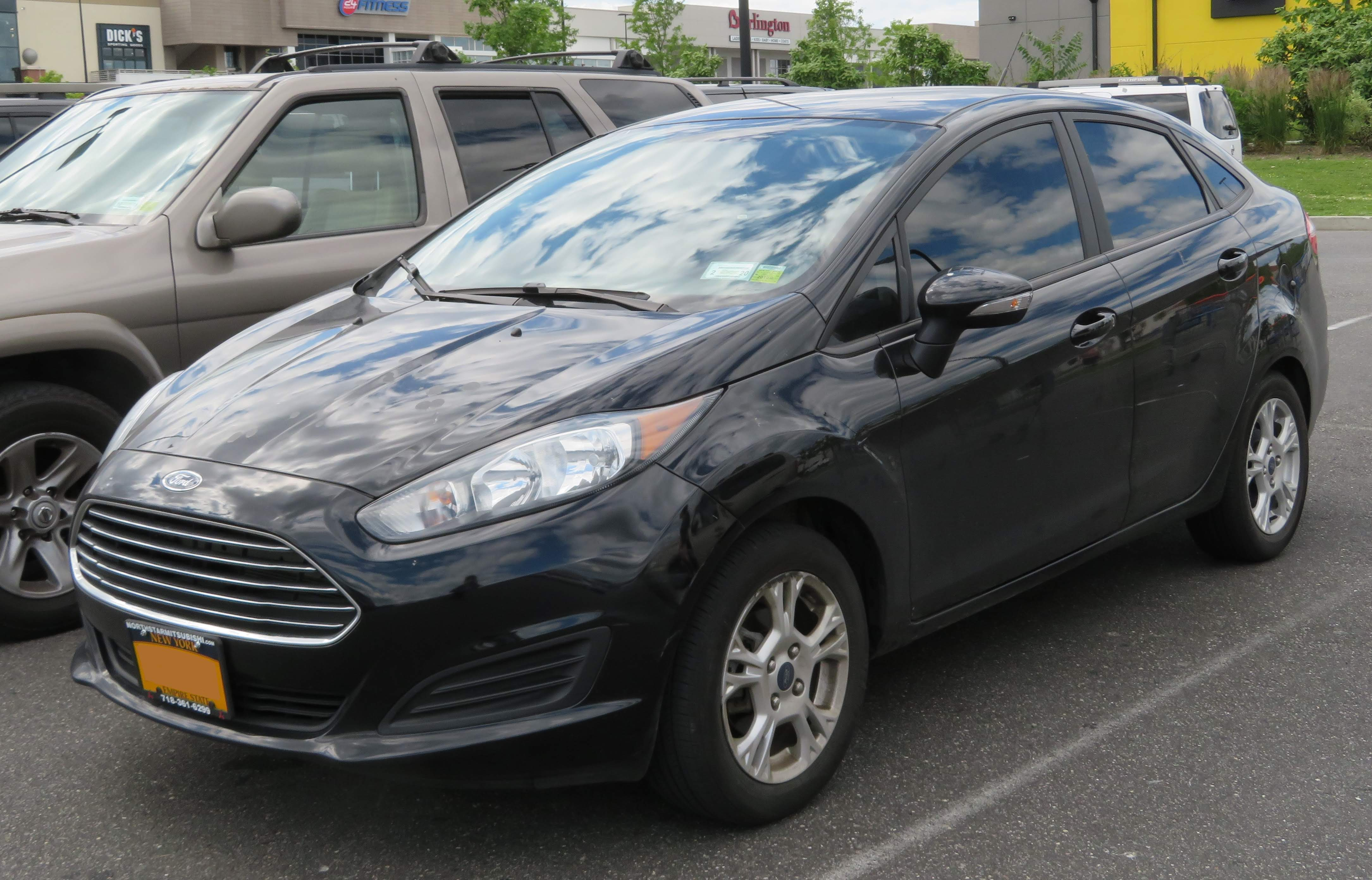
2016 Ford Fiesta sedan 1.4

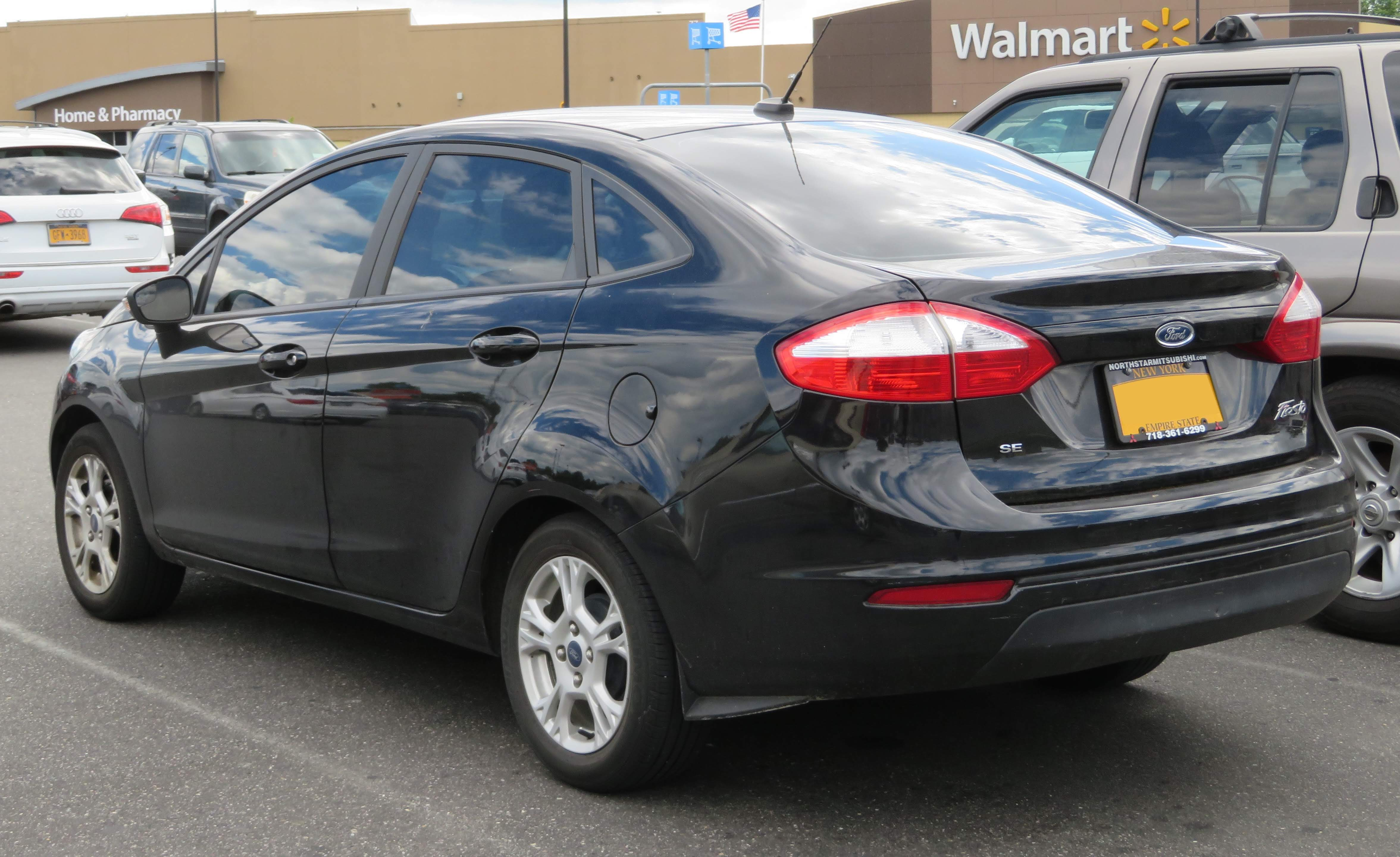
2016 Ford Fiesta sedan 1.4

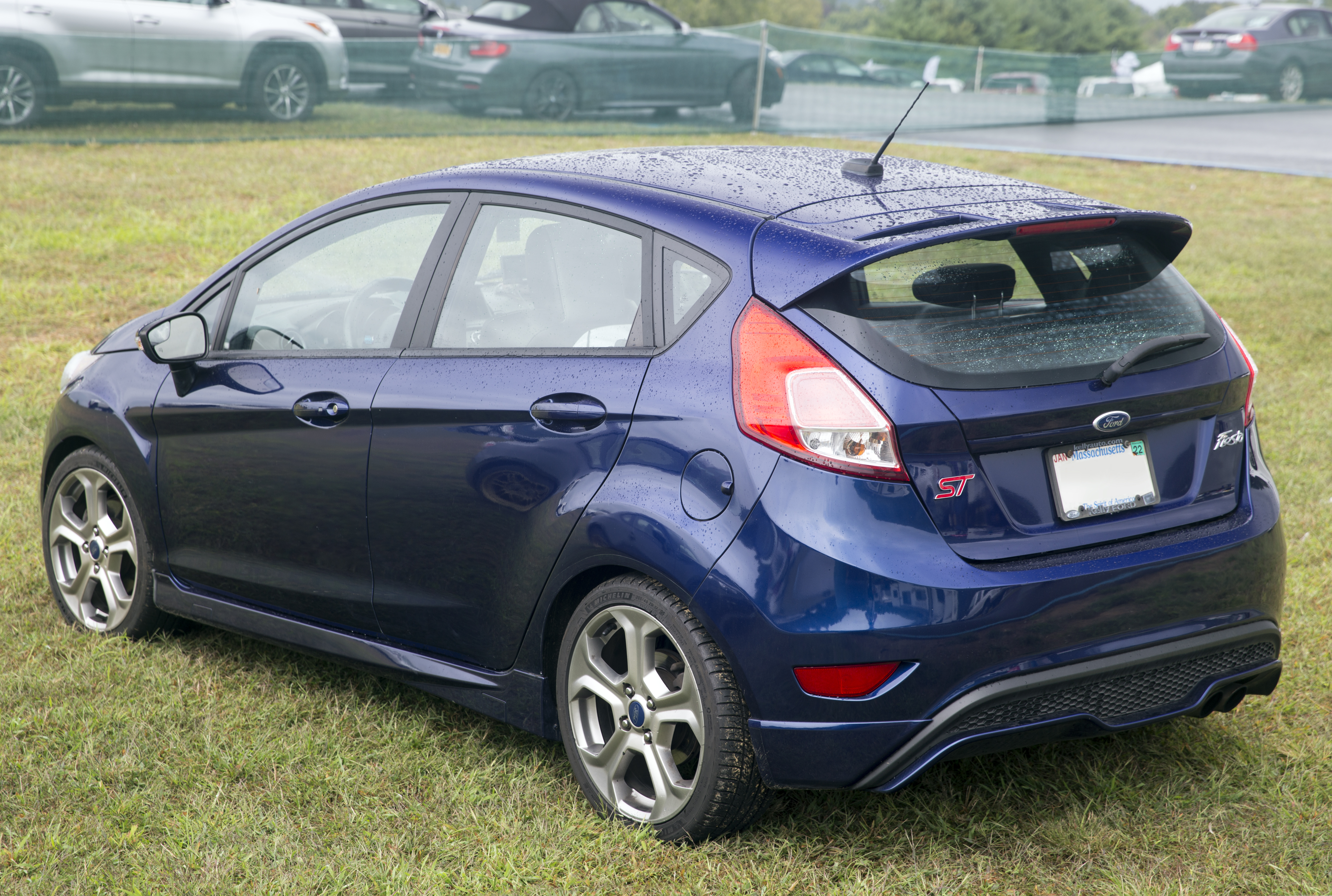
2016 Ford Fiesta ST

== Other markets ==
=== United Kingdom ===
UK trim levels for the new Fiesta include Studio, Edge, Metal, Style, Style Plus, ECONetic, Zetec, Zetec S, Titanium and Titanium Individual. After the facelift in 2013, trim levels in the UK became Studio, Style, Zetec, Zetec S, Titanium, Titanium X and the newly introduced ST.

=== India ===
The sixth generation saloon was launched in India in July 2011 with both petrol and diesel variants. Locally assembled in Chennai, it was sold alongside the older Fiesta, which in turn was rebadged as the Ford Classic. The Fiesta received a facelift in 2014 with changes to the front, rear and the interior. The top-spec variant came with Bluetooth connectivity, cruise control, pull drift compensation, automatic climate control and voice command as standard features. Production ceased in September 2015 due to low demand.

=== Thailand ===
The Fiesta was launched in Thailand in September 2010. Manufactured at the AutoAlliance Thailand in Rayong alongside the related Mazda2, production later moved to nearby Ford Thailand Manufacturing alongside the EcoSport. The plants supplied the Fiesta for the domestic market, neighbouring Southeast Asian markets and Australia. There were 3 trim levels at launch; 1.4 Style, 1.6 Trend and 1.6 Sport. All models feature ABS, driver airbag, and electric mirrors; the top-of-the-range Sport models feature front passenger airbag, alloy wheels and stability control across the range, along with voice command in-car entertainment system and Bluetooth connectivity.

Later, the Sport+ models with added features was added to the line-up, as was Sport Ultimate model with 7 airbags (dual front, side, curtain and driver knee) as standard, which was a first in the subcompact segment in Thailand. Both used the 1.6-litre engine. In March 2012, the 1.5-litre engine with 109 PS (80 kW; 108 bhp) replaced the 1.6-litre engines with its transmissions unchanged.

A 6-speed PowerShift dual-clutch transmission was made available as standard transmission initially for the 1.6-litre engines, and also for the 1.5-litre variants from March 2012 onwards. The Thai-made Fiesta versions – both saloon and five-door hatch – feature a 100 mm pitch circle diameter (PCD) wheel lug mount measurement identical to the Mazda2, as opposed to the 108 mm one as found in other global versions.

The seventh generation Fiesta was set to be produced in 2019 under the Eco Car tax incentive, however Ford axed the plans and instead discontinued passenger car production in the country. As the result, the Fiesta was discontinued in the country without any replacement.

=== Brazil ===
In Brazil, the Fiesta sedan was imported from Mexico since 2010 before local production of the hatchback version started in 2013 at the São Bernardo do Campo plant. The Brazilian-made Fiesta is equipped with the 1.5-litre and 1.6-litre Sigma flex fuel engine. The facelifted version gained an imported 1.0-litre EcoBoost engine option. The power output and torque are 125 bhp (93 kW) with petrol and 128 bhp (95 kW) with ethanol. Due to falling sales figures, production and sales of the Fiesta in Brazil ended as of February 2019 with no direct replacement, after being sold for 24 years.

== Powertrain ==
Petrol engines
Model	Engine	Power	Torque	Years
1.0 L Duratec Ti-VCT	998 cc (61 cu in) I3	65 PS (48 kW; 64 bhp) at 6,300 rpm	105 N⋅m (77 lb⋅ft) at 4,100 rpm	2013–2017
1.0 L Duratec Ti-VCT	998 cc (61 cu in) I3	80 PS (59 kW; 79 bhp)	105 N⋅m (77 lb⋅ft) at 4,100 rpm	2013–2017
1.0 L EcoBoost	998 cc (61 cu in) turbo I3	100 PS (74 kW; 99 bhp) at 6,000 rpm	170 N⋅m (125 lbf⋅ft) at 1,400–4,000 rpm	2013–2017
1.0 L EcoBoost	998 cc (61 cu in) turbo I3	125 PS (92 kW; 123 bhp) at 6,000 rpm	170–200 N⋅m (125–148 lbf⋅ft) at 1,400–4,500 rpm	2013–2019
1.0 L EcoBoost	998 cc (61 cu in) turbo I3	140 PS (103 kW; 138 bhp) at 6,000 rpm	190–210 N⋅m (140–155 lbf⋅ft) at 1,400–4,500 rpm	2014–2017
1.25 L Duratec	1,242 cc (76 cu in) I4	60 PS (44 kW; 59 bhp) at 6,000 rpm	109 N⋅m (80 lb⋅ft) at 3,600 rpm	2008–2017
1.25 L Duratec	1,242 cc (76 cu in) I4	82 PS (60 kW; 81 bhp) at 5,800 rpm	114 N⋅m (84 lb⋅ft) at 4,200 rpm	2008–2017
1.4 L Duratec	1,388 cc (85 cu in) I4	96 PS (71 kW; 95 bhp) at 5,750 rpm	128 N⋅m (94 lb⋅ft) at 4,200 rpm	2008–2013
1.5 L Duratec	1,499 cc (91 cu in) I4	107 PS (79 kW; 106 bhp) at 6,000 rpm	145 N⋅m (107 lbf⋅ft) at 4,250 rpm	2013–2017
1.5 L Duratec Ti-VCT	1,499 cc (91 cu in) I4	112 PS (82 kW; 110 bhp)	140 N⋅m (103 lbf⋅ft)	2013–2017
1.6 L Duratec	1,596 cc (97.4 cu in) I4	110 PS (81 kW; 108 bhp) at 6,250 rpm	155 N⋅m (114 lbf⋅ft) at 4,250 rpm	2010–2013
1.6 L Duratec Ti-VCT	1,596 cc (97.4 cu in) I4	120 PS (88 kW; 118 bhp) at 6,000 rpm	152 N⋅m (112 lb⋅ft) at 4,050 rpm	2008–2017
1.6 L Duratec Ti-VCT	1,596 cc (97.4 cu in) I4	125 PS (92 kW; 123 bhp) at 6,500 rpm	155 N⋅m (114 lb⋅ft) at 4,250 rpm	2013–2019
1.6 L Duratec Ti-VCT	1,596 cc (97.4 cu in) I4	134 PS (99 kW; 132 bhp) at 6,700 rpm	160 N⋅m (118 lb⋅ft) at 4,250 rpm	2011–2012 (S1600, Metal)
1.6 L EcoBoost Ti-VCT	1,598 cc (97.5 cu in) turbo I4	182 PS (134 kW; 180 bhp) at 6,500 rpm	244 N⋅m (180 lb⋅ft) at 1,600–5,000 rpm	2013–2017
1.6 L EcoBoost Ti-VCT	1,598 cc (97.5 cu in) turbo I4	200 PS (147 kW; 197 bhp) at 5,700 rpm	290 N⋅m (214 lb⋅ft) at 1,600 rpm	2013–2017
LPG engine
Model	Engine	Power	Torque	Years
1.4 L Duratec	1,388 cc (85 cu in) I4	92 PS (68 kW; 91 bhp) at 5,500 rpm	123 N⋅m (91 lb⋅ft) at 4,300 rpm	2011–2017
Ethanol engines
Model	Engine	Power	Torque	Years
1.5 L Duratec	1,499 cc (91 cu in) I4	111 PS (82 kW; 109 bhp) at 6,250 rpm	147 N⋅m (108 lbf⋅ft) at 4,250 rpm	2013–2017
1.6 L Duratec Ti-VCT	1,596 cc (97 cu in) I4	128 PS (94 kW; 126 bhp) at 6,500 rpm	157 N⋅m (116 lbf⋅ft) at 5,000 rpm	2017–2018
1.6 L Duratec Ti-VCT	1,596 cc (97 cu in) I4	130 PS (96 kW; 128 bhp) at 6,000 rpm	157 N⋅m (116 lb⋅ft) at 5,000 rpm	2013–2017
Diesel engines
Model	Engine	Power	Torque	Years
1.4 L Duratorq TDCi	1,398 cc (85 cu in) I4 TD	68 PS (50 kW; 67 bhp) at 4,000 rpm	160 N⋅m (118 lbf⋅ft) at 1,750 rpm	2008–2012
1.5 L Duratorq TDCi	1,499 cc (91 cu in) I4 TD	75 PS (55 kW; 74 bhp) at 3,750 rpm	185 N⋅m (136 lbf⋅ft) at 1,750 rpm	2013–2017
1.5 L Duratorq TDCi	1,499 cc (91 cu in) I4 TD	95 PS (70 kW; 94 bhp) at 3,750 rpm	215 N⋅m (159 lbf⋅ft) at 1,750–2,750 rpm	2015–2017
1.6 L Duratorq TDCi	1,560 cc (95 cu in) I4 TD	75 PS (55 kW; 74 bhp) at 4,000 rpm	185 N⋅m (136 lb⋅ft) at 1,750 rpm	2008–2013
1.6 L Duratorq TDCi	1,560 cc (95 cu in) I4 TD	90 PS (66 kW; 89 bhp) at 4,000 rpm	212 N⋅m (156 lb⋅ft) at 1,750 rpm	2008–2013
1.6 L Duratorq TDCi	1,560 cc (95 cu in) I4 TD	95 PS (70 kW; 94 bhp) at 4,000 rpm	205 N⋅m (151 lb⋅ft) at 1,750–3,000 rpm	2011–2015

The 1.6-litre Duratorq TDCi with 75 PS (55 kW; 74 bhp) is sold instead of, in some countries alongside, the 1.4-litre TDCi. The 1.6-litre Duratorq TDCi with 212 N⋅m (156 lb⋅ft) torque is used on non-van models only. Vans with the 1.6-litre Duratorq TDCi are rated 200 N⋅m (150 lb⋅ft) torque.

Transmission choices include a 5-speed manual, a 4-speed automatic and a dual-clutch 6-speed automatic. The 4-speed automatic was only offered with the 1.4-litre Duratec engine. The PowerShift 6-speed dual-clutch gearbox is available in North America as an option in addition to the 5-speed manual, which may be sold with a diesel in Europe in the future. This dual-clutch gearbox was also standard on some models in Thailand, and was available as an option in India.

== Safety and recall ==
The Fiesta in its most basic Latin American market configuration received 4 stars for adult occupants and 4 stars for toddlers from Latin NCAP in 2012.

Latin NCAP 1.0 test results Ford Fiesta + 2 Airbags (2012, based on Euro NCAP 1997)
Test	Points	Stars
Adult occupant:	12.87/17.0	4 /5 stars
Child occupant:	37.80/49.00	4 /5 stars

The Fiesta in its standard European market configuration received 5 stars from Euro NCAP in 2012.

In 2017, Ford recalled 2014–2015 Ford Fiesta ST with 1.6 EcoBoost engines because of a risk of engine fires caused by a "lack of coolant circulation". The recall partly contributed to a charge of US$300 million by Ford.

ANCAP test results* Ford Fiesta 5 door hatches with dual frontal airbags (2009)
Test	Score
Overall	4 /5 stars
Frontal offset	12.90/16
Side impact	13.72/16
Pole	Not Assessed
Seat belt reminders	2/3
Whiplash protection	Not Assessed
Pedestrian protection	Marginal
Electronic stability control	Optional

ANCAP test results* Ford Fiesta 5 door hatches with head-protecting side airbags, driver knee airbag and ESC (2009)
Test	Score
Overall	5 /5 stars
Frontal offset	14.90/16
Side impact	15.55/16
Pole	2/2
Seat belt reminders	2/3
Whiplash protection	Not Assessed
Pedestrian protection	Adequate
Electronic stability control	Optional

ANCAP test results* Ford Fiesta 3 door hatches with head-protecting side airbags, driver knee airbag and ESC (2009)
Test	Score
Overall	5 /5 stars
Frontal offset	14.90/16
Side impact	15.55/16
Pole	2/2
Seat belt reminders	2/3
Whiplash protection	Not Assessed
Pedestrian protection	Adequate
Electronic stability control	Optional

ANCAP test results* Ford Fiesta all variants (2009)
Test	Score
Overall	5 /5 stars
Frontal offset	14.90/16
Side impact	15.55/16
Pole	2/2
Seat belt reminders	2/3
Whiplash protection	Pending
Pedestrian protection	Adequate
Electronic stability control	Standard

ANCAP test results* Ford Fiesta all sedan variants with 7 airbags (2010)
Test	Score
Overall	5 /5 stars
Frontal offset	14.90/16
Side impact	15.55/16
Pole	2/2
Seat belt reminders	2/3
Whiplash protection	Not Assessed
Pedestrian protection	Adequate
Electronic stability control	Standard

ANCAP test results* Ford Fiesta ECOnetic variants (2010)
Test	Score
Overall	5 /5 stars
Frontal offset	14.90/16
Side impact	15.55/16
Pole	2/2
Seat belt reminders	2/3
Whiplash protection	Not Assessed
Pedestrian protection	Adequate
Electronic stability control	Standard

ASEAN NCAP test results Ford Fiesta (2012)
Test	Points	Stars
Adult occupant:	15.73	5 /5 stars
Child occupant:	66%	0 /5 stars
Safety assist:	NA	

== PowerShift lawsuit ==
The Fiesta is a subject of an alleged defect regarding the PowerShift (DPS6) dual-clutch automatic transmission, which is fitted to the 2011–2016 Fiesta. Ford customers in the United States had filed multiple class action lawsuit since 2012, due to the issues involving 1.5 million vehicles which consists of 2011–2016 Fiesta along with 2012–2016 Focus which were allegedly built with defective transmissions prone to “shuddering, slipping, bucking, jerking, hesitation while changing gears, premature internal wear, delays in downshifting and, in some cases, sudden or delayed acceleration.” Owners have reported replacing clutches, output shafts, and entire transmissions, and opting for software updates. Many owners said the problems reappear even after service technicians claim the transmission is within normal factory limits. According to court documents, Ford issued multiple technical service bulletins but the problems were never fully resolved.

There have been at least 6 revisions of clutch packs and transmission control modules since inception. Newer clutch packs and transmissions are more resistant to wear and fluid contamination, as the source of many shudder issues involved an improperly installed seal which was leaking transmission fluid onto the dry clutches. Ford also claims there are "changes to the clutch material for better performance across temperature ranges (new for 2016)."

A Free Press "Out of Gear" investigation published in July 2019 revealed for the first time internal company documents showing Ford was aware the transmission was defective before putting the vehicles on mass production and continued producing and selling them over the past decade as customers spent thousands on repairs. Ford whistleblowers described to the Free Press in 2019 a fearful atmosphere within the company that led to silence during the development of the DPS6 transmission and, in one case, downgrading the risk assessment of the clutch and control unit due to "political reasons."

A month after the Free Press investigation was published, Ford extended warranty coverage to 600,000 vehicle owners. It is the second warranty extension after the first one in 2014. Ford later stated that the newspaper held "conclusions that are not based in fact," but the transmission has nonetheless created numerous complaints to the National Highway Traffic Safety Administration of rough shifting and sometimes interruption of power.

In January 2020, Ford proposed an updated settlement of a minimum of $30 million in cash reimbursement in a class-action lawsuit over PowerShift problems, which had since been approved by a federal judge in March 2020. Claims started to be processed and payments distributed after the effective date of April 7, 2020. The payment, which may include a buyback program, could top $20,000 apiece, depending on the issues experienced.

== Reception ==
In late 2008 Motor Trend called the new generation of Fiesta a "superb little car" whose "greatest problem is that it's still a year away", a reference to the fact that the Fiesta would not arrive in the US until early 2010. British magazine Auto Express called the car a "new class leader"; UK's Car Magazine said it was a "huge achievement" which will "please just about everyone". The February 2009 issue of Britain's What Car? magazine named the new Fiesta "Car of the Year" and the Ford Mondeo "Best Family Car" and "Best Estate." According to What Car?, there is plenty of space in the front of the cabin, however, the rear knee space is rather limited and the backrests do not fold flat onto the base, making an uneven floor for the expanded boot.

The Fiesta was featured on episode 6 of series 12 of Top Gear in a series of "serious" road tests conducted by presenter Jeremy Clarkson, from escaping 'baddies' driving a Chevrolet Corvette C6 in the Festival Place Basingstoke shopping mall, to participating in an amphibious beach assault with the Royal Marines.

In its first two years since the latest generation Fiesta went on sale in October 2008, more than 940,000 Fiestas had been purchased by customers around the world, with 810,000 (86%) being sold in Europe (September 2010).

== Environmental performance ==
In February 2019, Green NCAP assessed Ford Fiesta with a 1.0-litre EcoBoost 100 PS engine and manual transmission:

Green NCAP test results Ford Fiesta (2019) 1l EcoBoost 4x2 manual Euro 6b
Test	Points
Overall:	0 /5 stars
Clean Air Index: 1.1/10: weak / Laboratory Tests / HC / CO / NOx / PN; 0.0/9 / Cold test / adequate / adequate / marginal / poor; 0.5/3 / Warm test / good / adequate / adequate / poor; 0.3/3 / Eco Mode / good / adequate / adequate / poor; 0.3/3 / Sport Mode / good / good / adequate / poor; 0.0/9 / Highway / good / poor / poor / poor; marginal / Road Test / HC / CO / NOx / PN; 2.6/7 / On-Road Drive / n.a. / adequate / adequate / poor; weak / Robustness
Energy Efficiency Index: 6.6/10: adequate / Laboratory Tests / Energy Efficiency; 8.4/10 / Cold test / adequate; 2.7/3 / Warm test / adequate; 2.6/3 / Eco Mode / adequate; 2.6/3 / Sport Mode / adequate; 6.2/10 / Highway / marginal
