= Ford Mondeo (third generation) =

Ford Mondeo Mk4 (third generation)
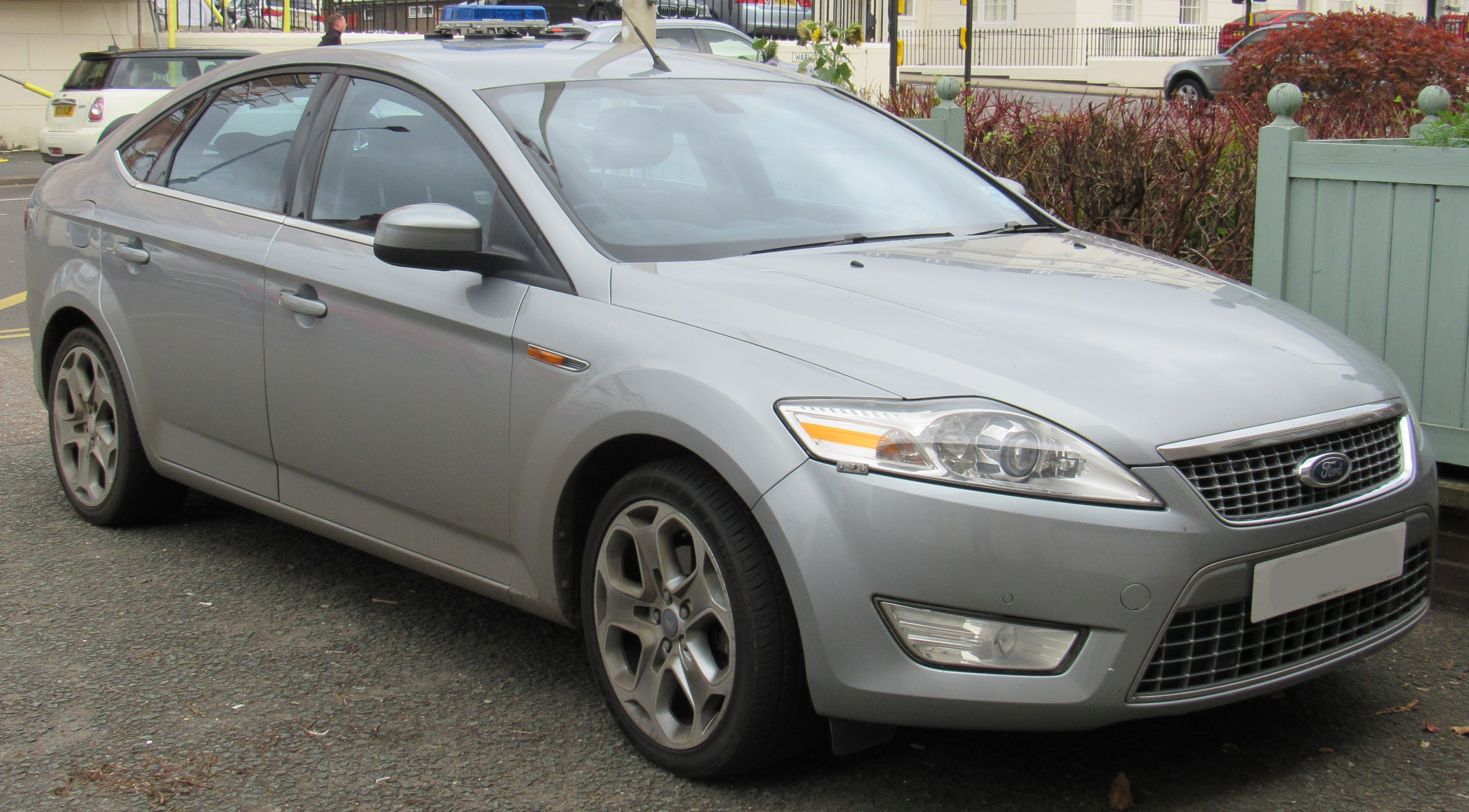

Overview
- Manufacturer: Ford
- Production: 2006–2014
- Assembly: Belgium: Genk (Genk Body & Assembly); Russia: Vsevolozhsk (Ford Sollers); China: Chongqing (Changan Ford); Taiwan: Taoyuan (FLHM); Vietnam: Hai Duong (Ford Vietnam)
- Designer: Martin Smith

Body and chassis
- Class: Large family car/Compact executive car (D)
- Body style: 4-door saloon; 5-door liftback/fastback; 5-door estate
- Layout: Front-engine, front-wheel drive/four-wheel drive
- Platform: Ford EUCD platform
- Related: Volvo S60; Volvo V60; Volvo S80; Volvo V70; Volvo XC70; Ford S-MAX; Ford Galaxy; Land Rover Freelander 2

Powertrain
- Engine: petrol and Flexible Fuel: 1.6 L Duratec I4 DOHC 16v; 1.6 L Duratec Ti-VCT I4 DOHC 16v; 1.6 L Ecoboost SCTi turbo I4 DOHC 16v; 1.8 L Mazda Duratec I4 DOHC 16V; 2.0 L Mazda Duratec I4 DOHC 16v; 2.0 L Ecoboost SCTi turbo I4 DOHC 16v; 2.3 L Mazda Duratec I4 DOHC 16v; 2.5 L Volvo Duratec turbo I5 DOHC 20v; Diesel engines: 1.6 L Ford/PSA DLD-416 TDCi turbo I4 SOHC 8v; 1.8 L DLD-418 TDCi turbo I4 DOHC 16v; 2.0 L PSA DW10 TDCi turbo DOHC I4 16v; 2.2 L PSA DW12 TDCi twin turbo I4 DOHC 16v
- Transmission: 5-speed manual Durashift; 6-speed manual Durashift; 6-speed Aisin automatic Durashift; 6-speed PowerShift dual-clutch automatic

Dimensions
- Wheelbase: 2,850 mm (112.2 in)
- Length: 4,844 mm (190.7 in) (saloon); 4,778 mm (188.1 in) (liftback); 4,830 mm (190.2 in) (estate)
- Width: 1,886 mm (74.3 in) (ex. mirrors); 2,078 mm (81.8 in) (inc. mirrors)
- Height: 1,500 mm (59.1 in) (saloon, liftback); 1,512 mm (59.5 in) (estate)
- Curb weight: 1,435–1,611 kg (3,164–3,552 lb)

Chronology
- Predecessor: Ford Mondeo (second generation)
- Successor: Ford Mondeo (fourth generation)

The Ford Mondeo Mk IV (third generation), codenamed CD345, was officially unveiled in five-door production form by Ford in late 2006. It is based on the EUCD platform, which was developed in collaboration with Volvo, the platform was the same as that used in the new large MPVs Galaxy and S-MAX, but not the North American Ford Fusion or the Mazda Atenza in Japan. It was also used for several Volvos starting with the Volvo S80 II.

== History ==
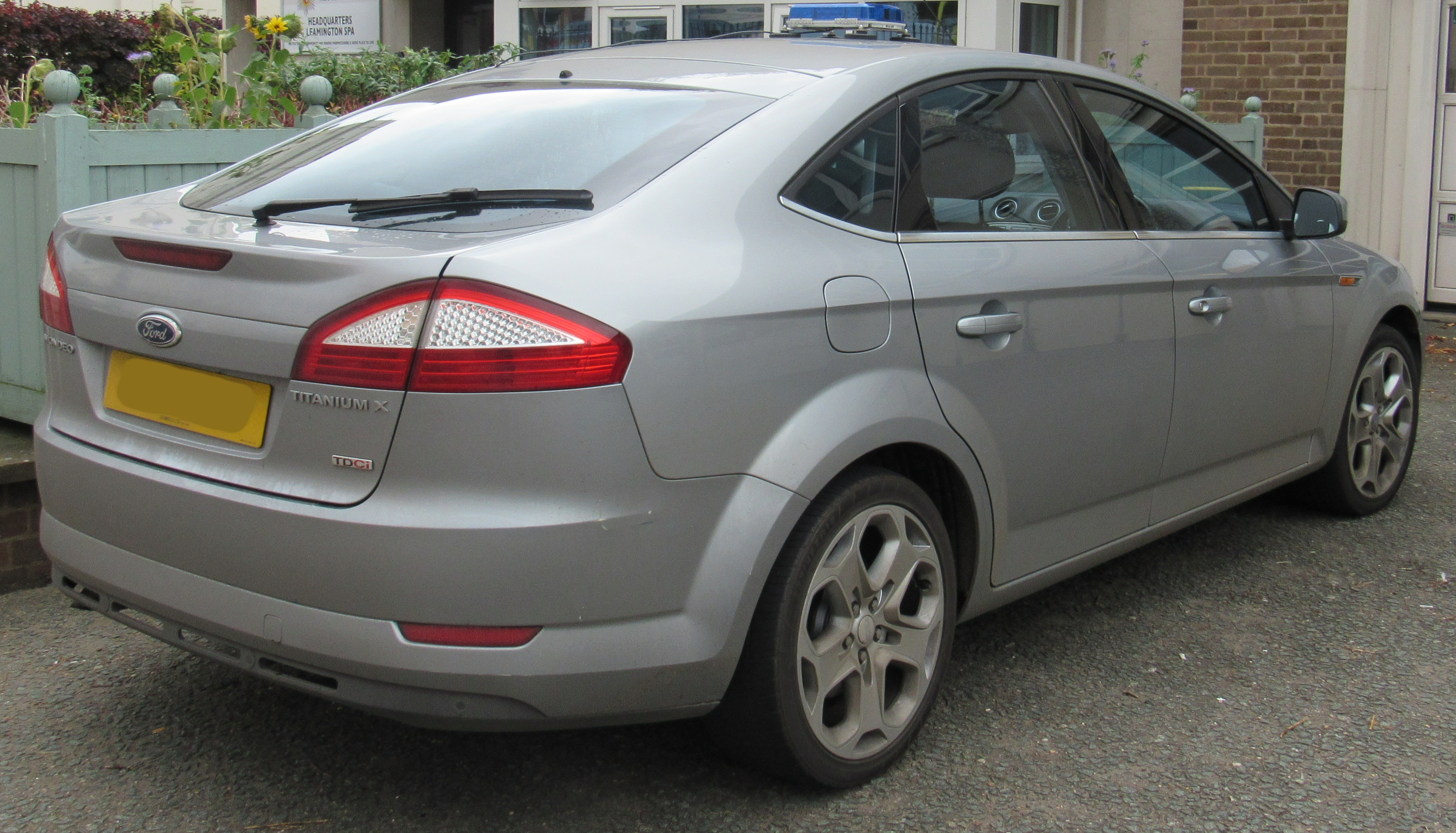
Liftback (pre-facelift)

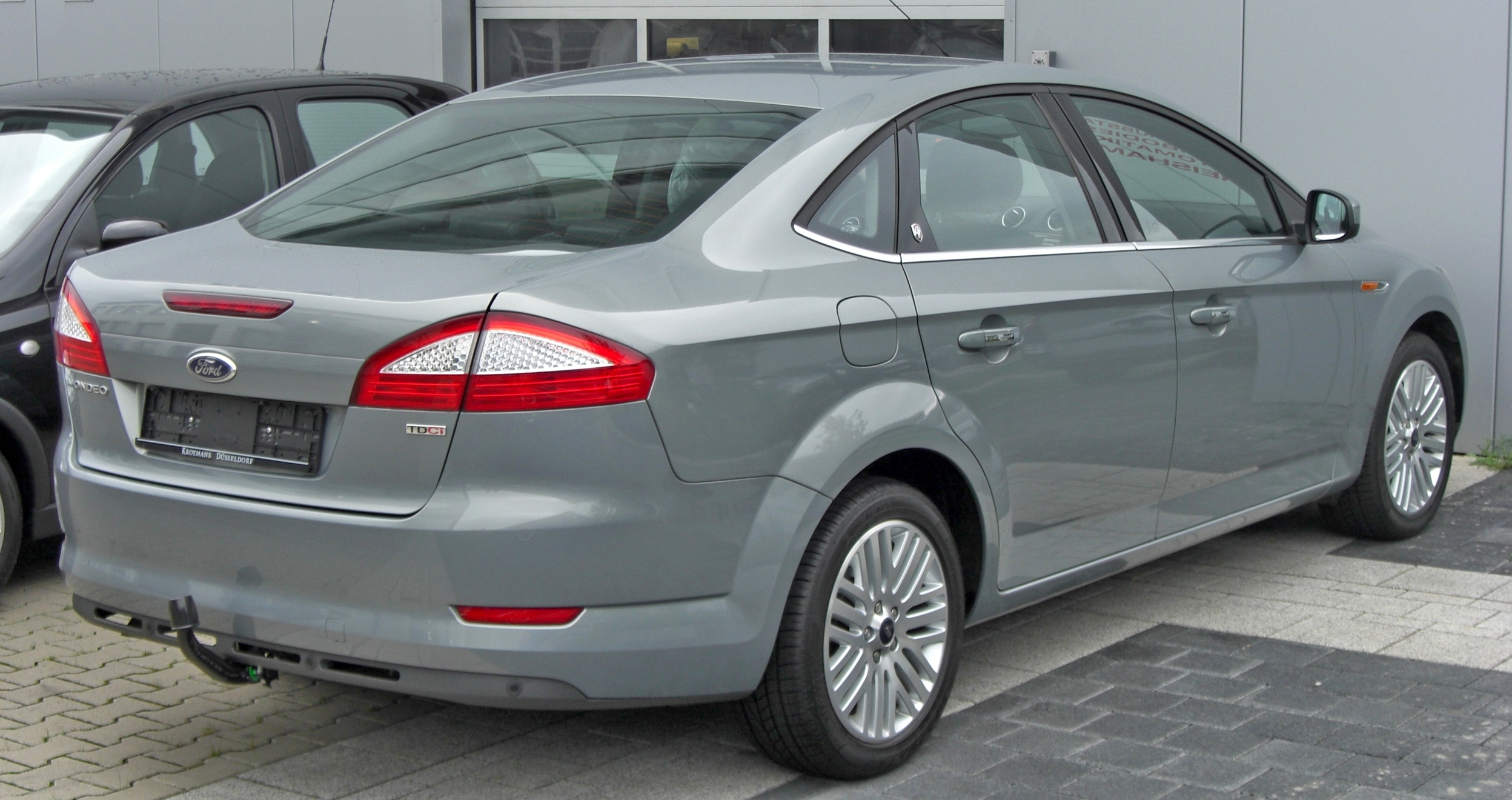
Sedan (pre-facelift)

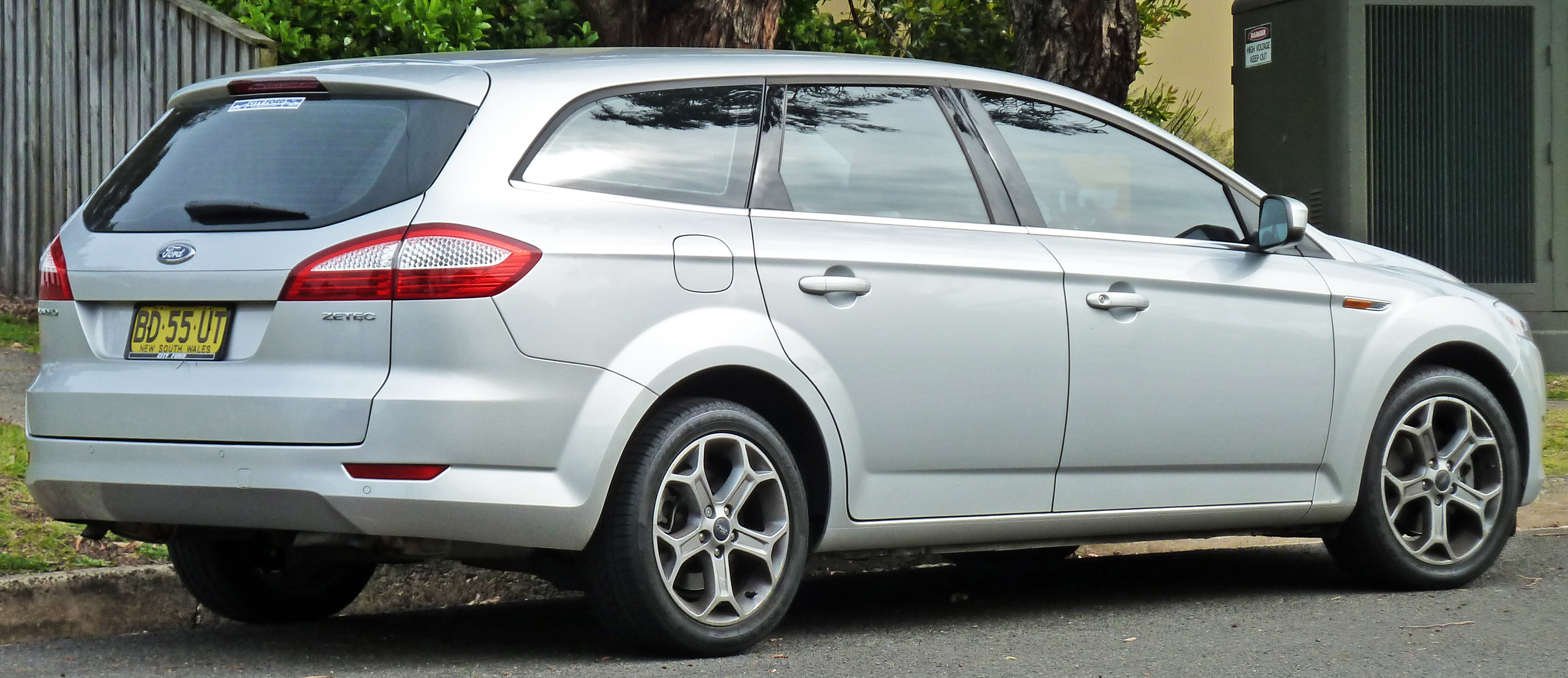
Estate (pre-facelift)

In February 2007, the Ford Mondeo Mk4 was launched in the UK; it was known internally at Ford as the third-generation Mondeo or by the code name CD345. It was available as a four-door sedan, five-door hatchback, or five-door station wagon, built on the EUCD platform shared with the S-Max, Galaxy, Volvo, and Land Rover. In February 2008, Ford announced that in some European markets the Mondeo will be made available with a new Titanium X Sport trim. This model aims to add an even more 'sporty character' than the current Titanium series. In March 2008, a new 2.2 175 PS (128.7 kW; 172.6 bhp) TDCi common-rail diesel engine will be available on Mondeo providing acceleration to 0-60 mph (97 km/h) in 8.4 seconds on the saloon and fuel consumption of returning 45.6 mpg combined (this engine was replaced with the 2.0l TDCi 163 returning a combined 53.3mpg imp gallons, with a marginal loss of performance). In March 2008, a new Mondeo ECOnetic based on the Zetec series was released. The Mondeo ECOnetic is powered with a 1.6 115 PS (84.6 kW; 113.4 bhp) TDCI diesel that returns CO_{2} ratings of just 139 g/km on the 5-door.

Although the fourth production model, after the Mk III Galaxy, S-Max and C-Max, to adopt Ford's current 'kinetic' design language, the Mondeo's design theme was first shown as the Ford Iosis concept at the 2005 Frankfurt Motor Show, which gave an indication to the look of the Mk IV Mondeo. The new car, in estate bodystyle, was pre-launched in 'concept' form at the Paris Motor Show on 30 September 2006.

The new platform allowed for the use of Volvo's five-cylinder petrol engine, already featured in the Focus ST and S-Max. Also, Ford dropped the two V6 engines for this platform. The petrol engines include a 1.6-litre with two power outputs (110 PS & 125 PS), the 2.0-litre (145 PS), 2.3-litre (161 PS) for 6-speed automatic models only, and a 2.5-litre five-cylinder turbo with 220 PS (162 kW; 217 hp). It was initially believed performance models may have featured engines from Jaguar and Volvo, but following Tata's purchase of Jaguar/Land Rover, this was no longer possible.

The new Mondeo uses the new electro-hydraulic steering system, first used on the C-Max, that sharpens the steering response, and helps to save fuel. Inside, the Mk IV features Ford's Human-Machine Interface (HMI) first seen on the Galaxy and S-Max whilst an enhanced instrument cluster featuring a 5-inch (130 mm) LCD for displaying trip computer and satellite navigation is available as an option on all models. Like the facelift Mk IV, base specification models have a manual heating/air-conditioning system in place of the climate control system. Also new on the Mk IV is the option of keyless starting of the engine via a "Ford Power" button on the dashboard.

A product placement promotional initiative made the Mk IV Mondeo James Bond's car for one incidental scene in Casino Royale, introducing the new model to global audiences in November 2006, on the launch day of the movie.

As with the previous model, the Mk IV Mondeo was not marketed in the United States or Canada because Ford sold the same-class Fusion, which was launched in 2005. The new Mondeo was not sold in Venezuela, Brazil or Colombia because the Fusion is sold locally, nor is it offered in Mexico, although the Mk IV model was popular there. It was, however, sold in Argentina. In Middle East and Central America, it was sold along with the Ford Fusion until 2013, when the fifth Mondeo was introduced. It was not even sold in South Africa because Ford South Africa did not want to sell it after the MK II Mondeo went out of production, which meant that the Ford Fusion became sold in South Africa in 2015, thus replacing the Mondeo altogether.

The 2007 Mondeo marked the return to the Australian market after a six-year absence, due to a resurgence in popularity of medium-sized cars in the last few years. This is in no small part the result of high fuel prices making people reconsider purchasing large cars like the Ford Falcon. Marketing for the Mondeo in Australia focused on the theme that the Mark IV Mondeo looks good but offers even more than style, with television commercials showing silly quotes from celebrities such as Britney Spears ("I've been to lots of overseas places... like Canada") interspersed with scenes of the vehicle and finally the slogan "more than just good looks".

Initial sales have been good in Australia, despite supply constraints from Europe limiting the car's success there. The Mondeo was initially sold as a sedan and liftback body styles in the Australian market, with diesel or petrol engines, and in four trim levels: LX, TDCi, Zetec and XR5 Turbo. In June 2009, Ford Australia announced that the 'Titanium' badge would also be used on Australian spec Mondeos, along with the release of the Mk IV Mondeo station wagon. Only the 2.3L petrol, 2.5L petrol and 2.0L diesel engines were offered there, the 2.5 being the only model available with a manual transmission. The ECOnetic Mondeo was also considered for the Australian market, but was never launched.

=== Facelift ===
In September 2010, a mid-cycle facelifted Mk IV Mondeo was introduced with some changes, such as the new ecoboost engines and LED daytime running lights. The final changes were shown at the 2010 Moscow International Motor Show. The front and rear of the car had minor changes, the biggest being the new Kinetic Design. The interior was improved, with a use of better materials.

The Ghia trim line was removed in the United Kingdom, so the Titanium takes over as the top of the range models, along with the saloon. The new econetic has higher mpg and further reduced CO_{2} emissions thanks to Stop-Start technology. Also introduced is an improved version of the 2.2L PSA diesel engine, delivering a healthy 200PS. This facelift is prompted by similar revisions to the S-MAX, which was launched in August 2010.

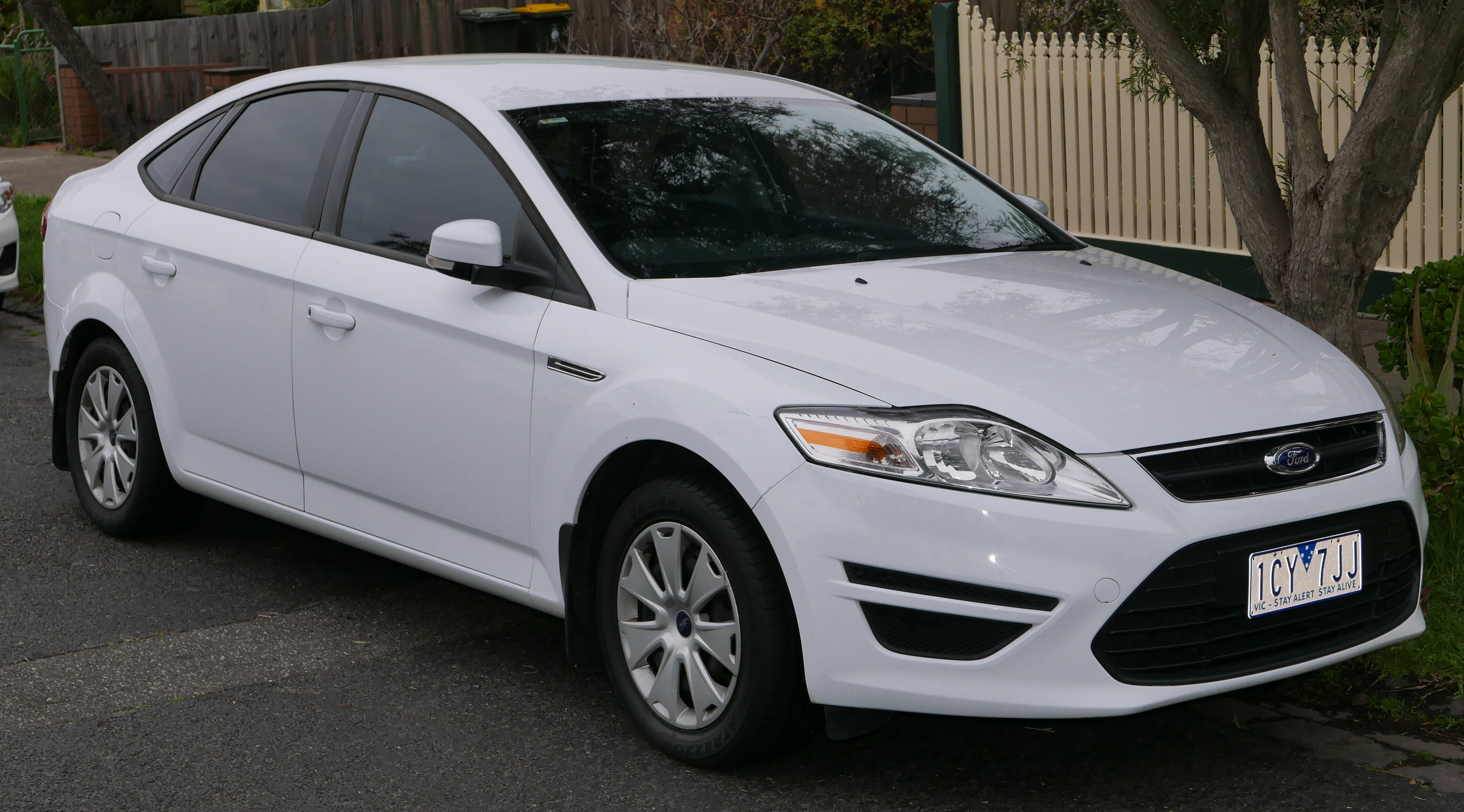
Liftback (facelift)

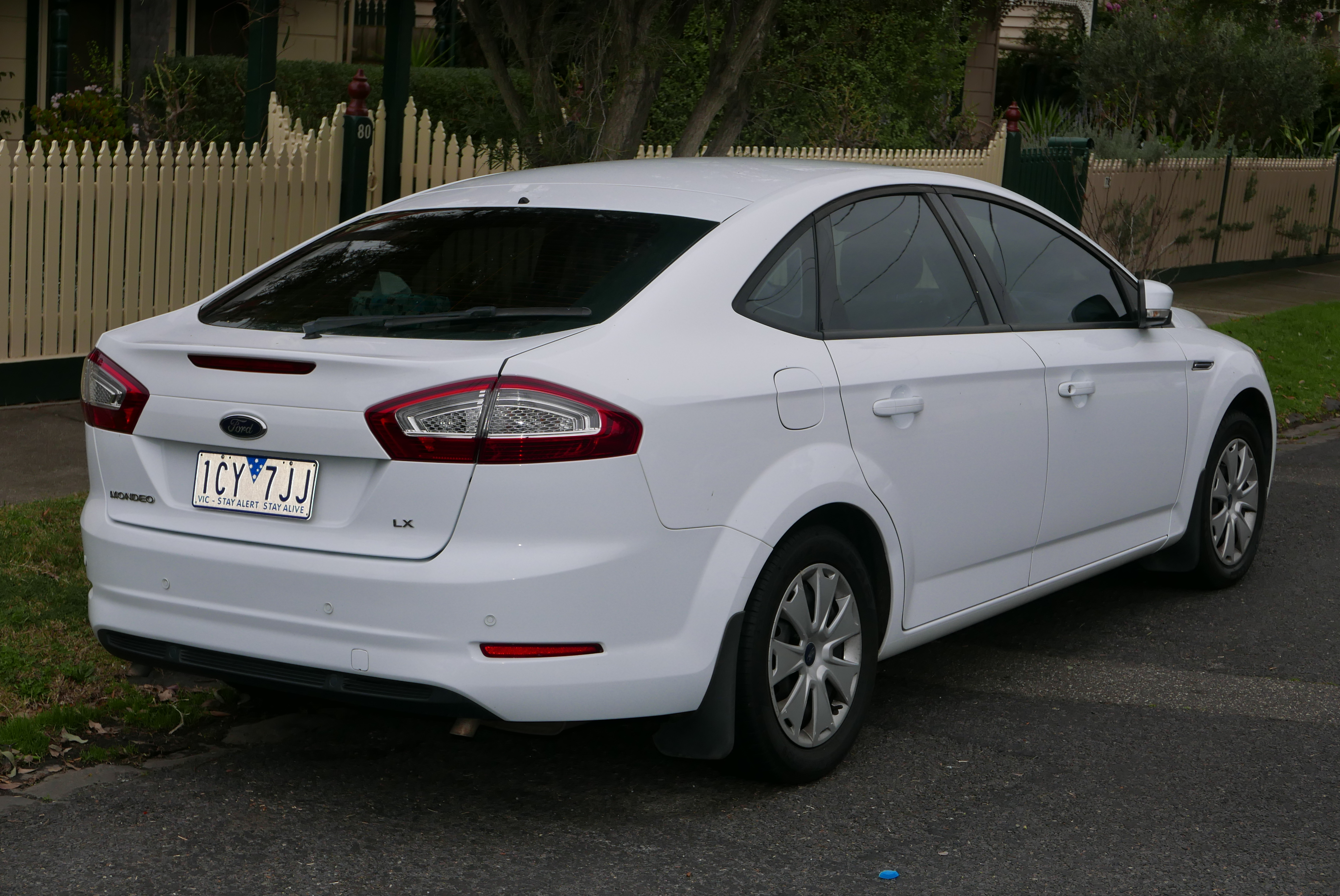
Liftback (facelift)

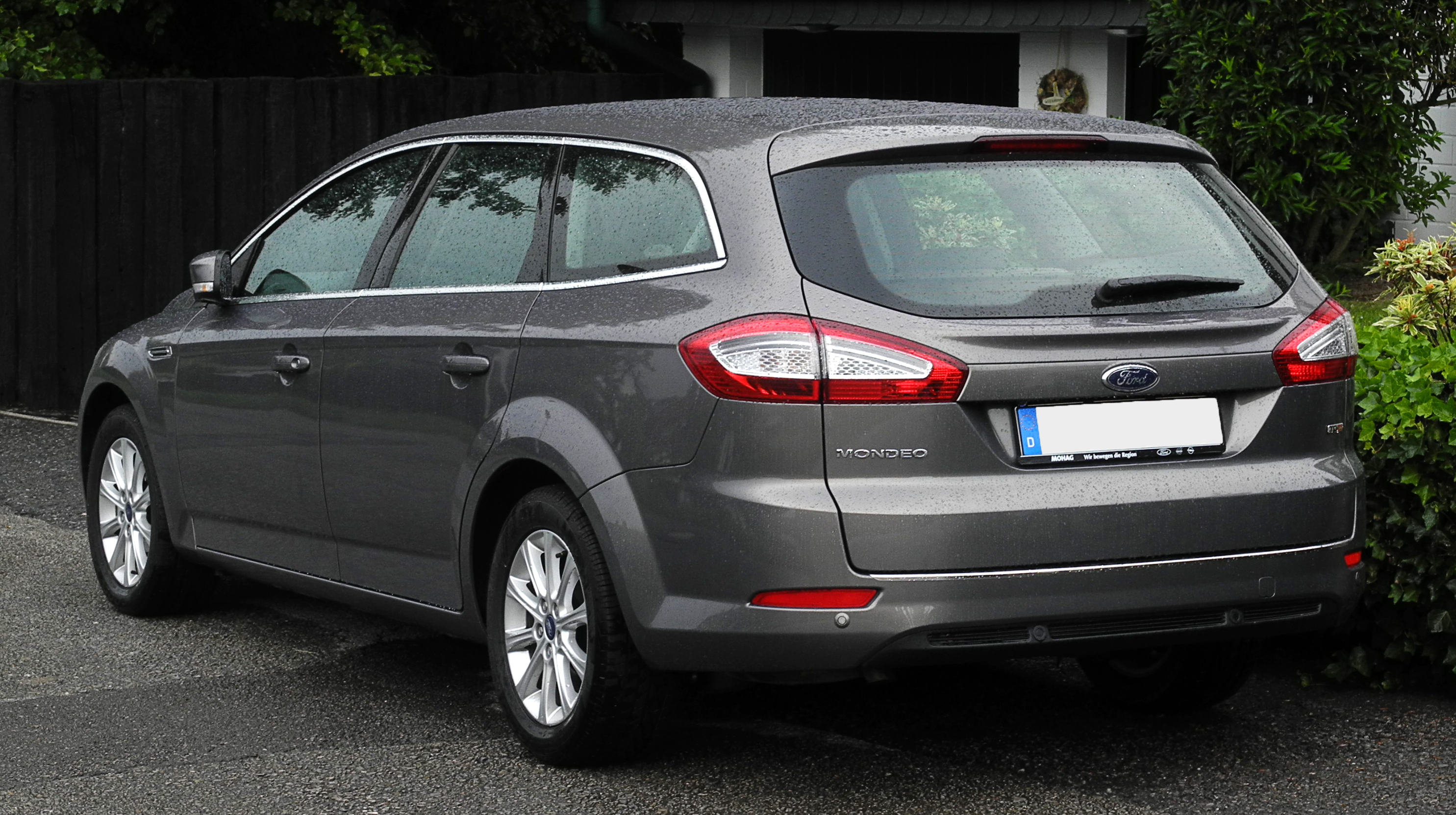
Estate (facelift)

== Trim levels ==
Range	Edge	Ambiente	Trend	LX	Zetec	Zetec Business Edition	ECOnetic	Ghia	Champions Edition	Titanium	Titanium S	Titanium X	Titanium X Sport	XR5 Turbo
2008 United Kingdom	✓	✗	✗	✗	✓	✗	✓	✓	✗	✓	✗	✓	✓	✗
2011 United Kingdom	✓	✗	✗	✗	✓	✓	✗	✗	✗	✓	✗	✓	✓	✗
2011 Germany	✗	✓	✓	✗ ✗	✗	✗	✗	✓	✓	✓	✓	✓	✗	✗
Australia	✗	✗	✗	✓	✓	✗	✗	✗	✗	✓	✗	✗	✗	✓ (discontinued 2010)

The Irish range has the following trim levels:

- Style
- ECOnetic
- Zetec
- Titanium X
- Titanium X Sport

The Norwegian range has the following trim levels:

- Trend
- ECOnetic
- Ghia (discontinued 2010)
- Titanium
- Titanium X
- Titanium S
- Premium

== Features ==
The Mk IV Mondeo hosted features such as:

- Human Machine Interface: A system so advanced it could present all features within the car being triggered with voice activation. (Only available on Zetec and higher spec)
- Blind Spot Monitoring: The Mk IV Mondeo could detect cars coming within the drivers blind spot areas, avoiding such issues.
- Active Cruise Control: The Mk IV Mondeo could detect vehicles coming ahead, slowing the car down to a desired safety to not cause any harm to any road users.
- Navigation: The Mk IV Mondeo featured a Blaupunkt-based NX System, though not quick it was vastly packed with features.

== Sales ==
Despite positive reviews from the motoring media right up to the final year of production, this generation of Mondeo has not been a strong seller in the United Kingdom, falling out of Top 10 Best Selling Cars In Britain in 2010, when just over 30,000 were sold, and plummeting to just over 16,000 sales in 2013, and less than 7,000 during 2014. In 2009, it was outsold by its main rival, the Vauxhall Insignia.

This placed it well short of competitors, like the BMW 3 Series, Mercedes-Benz C-Class, and Vauxhall Insignia. This in stark contrast to the 1990s, when sales of the original Mondeo topped 100,000 per year, and even the second generation model peaked at more than 80,000 in 2001. It was still selling above 50,000 units per year in 2005. However, the popularity of more expensive versions of the Focus, the Kuga SUV and the related S-MAX have minimized the impact of the Mondeo's fall in popularity on overall Ford sales.

== Awards ==
- 2007 Auto Express Car of the Year (Auto Express quoted the Mondeo is: "Ford's finest ever car")
- 2007 Auto Express Best Family Car
- 2007 Fifth Gear: Best Family Newcomer
- 2007 Top Gear Car of the Year (Joint COTY, Subaru Legacy Outback)
- 2007 RACV: Best Mid–Size Car Over $28,000
- 2007 Drive Car of the Year: Best Medium Car
- 2008 Semperit Irish Car of the Year
- 2008 What Car? Best Estate Car
- 2008 What Car? Best Family Car
- 2008 Motor Trend: Top 10 Car
- 2008 Car and Driver: 10 Best Car
- 2008 Car News Magazine (Taiwan): Best Domestic Large Sedan
- 2008 Sina: Best Driving Performance Car
- 2008 Drive Car of the Year: Best Medium Car
- 2008 The Caravan Club: Tow Car of the Year (Mondeo 2.5t Estate)
- 2008 Auto Express Best Family Car
- 2009 What Car? Best Estate Car
- 2009 What Car? Best Family Car
- 2009 New Zealand Automobile Association: Best Medium Car
- 2010 Drive Car of the Year: Best Medium Car
- 2011 What Car? Best Estate Car
- 2011 What Car? Best Family Car
- 2012 What Car? Best Estate Car
- 2012 What Car? Best Family Car
- 2012 Now Magazine: "Most Attractive Car For A Man To Drive"
- 2013 What Car? Best Estate Car
- 2013 What Car? Best Family Car

== Safety ==
ANCAP test results* Ford Mondeo all variants (2010)
Test	Score
Overall	5 /5 stars
Frontal offset	15.32/16
Side impact	15.81/16
Pole	2/2
Seat belt reminders	2/3
Whiplash protection	Not Assessed
Pedestrian protection	Marginal
Electronic stability control	Standard
