= Ford B-Max =

Mini MPV produced by Ford (2012-2017)

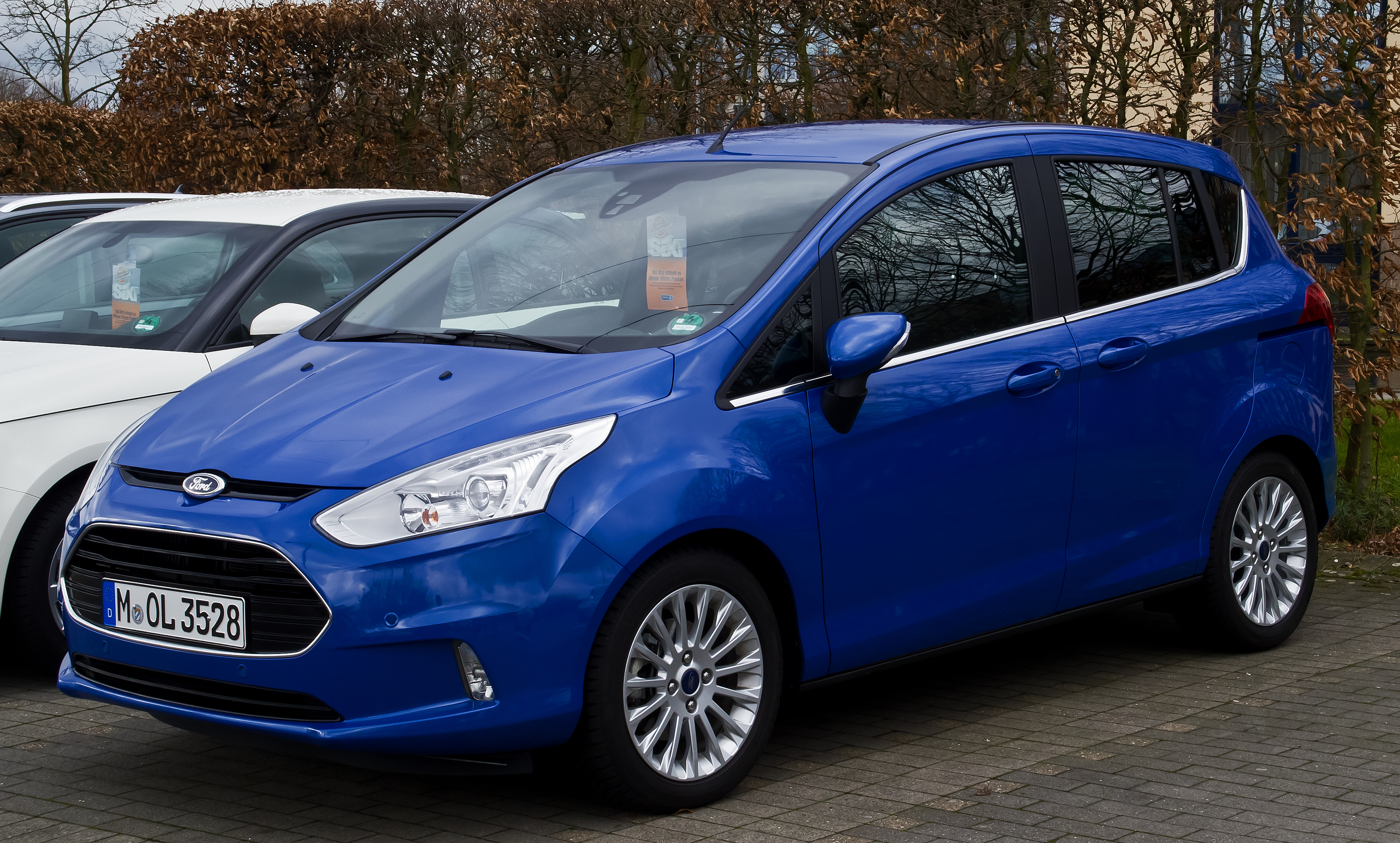

Overview
- Manufacturer: Ford Europe
- Model code: B232
- Production: June 2012 – September 2017
- Assembly: Romania: Craiova (Ford Romania)
- Designer: Ernesto Rupar; Eugen Enns

Body and chassis
- Class: Mini MPV (B)
- Body style: 5-door MPV
- Layout: Front-engine, front-wheel-drive
- Platform: Ford global B-car platform
- Related: Ford Fiesta Mk VI

Powertrain
- Engine: Petrol: 1.0 L EcoBoost SCTi I3; 1.4 L Duratec I4; 1.6 L Duratec Ti-VCT I4; Diesel: 1.5 L Duratorq TDCi I4; 1.6 L Duratorq TDCi I4
- Transmission: 5-speed iB5 Durashift manual (1.0/1.4 gasoline and 1.5/1.6 diesel only); 6-speed PowerShift dual-clutch automatic (1.6 gasoline only)

Dimensions
- Wheelbase: 2,489 mm (98.0 in)
- Length: 4,077 mm (160.5 in)
- Width: 1,751 mm (68.9 in)
- Height: 1,604 mm (63.1 in)

Chronology
- Predecessor: Ford Fusion
- Successor: Ford Puma (crossover)

The Ford B-Max (stylized as Ford B-MAX) is a mini MPV (M-segment) manufactured by Ford Europe from 2012 to 2017. Built on the Ford global B platform, it was initially unveiled as a concept car at the 2011 Geneva Motor Show, and was officially launched at the 2012 Mobile World Congress in Barcelona.

Production began in June 2012, and marketing of the first units started during late July. It was launched in the United Kingdom on 1 September 2012. The B-Max is based on the Ford Fiesta, and some of its main rivals were the Citroën C3 Picasso, Kia Venga, and Vauxhall Meriva.

== Overview ==
The styling of the B-Max continues the Ford Kinetic Design theme, and has rear sliding doors with no B-pillars. The B-Max is available with the new 1.0-litre three-cylinder engine of the Ford EcoBoost family, that features turbocharged direct injection and start-stop system.

This engine officially won the title of "International Engine of the Year 2012". The 1.6-litre Duratec engine can be fitted with the PowerShift six speed dual-clutch automatic gearbox.

It has three different trim levels: Studio, Zetec and Titanium. The Studio is the basic model, and it is available only with the 1.4-litre engine. The first B-Max was bought by the President of Romania, Traian Băsescu, on 25 June 2012, directly from the Craiova plant. In September 2017, production of B-Max ended, due to dwindling demand for the model, as well as a general decline in sales of mini MPVs.

Unusually for a Ford, this model did not receive a mid-cycle facelift in order to boost sales, the closest successors were the EcoSport as well as the Fiesta Active, transitioning from a MPV to a SUV design.

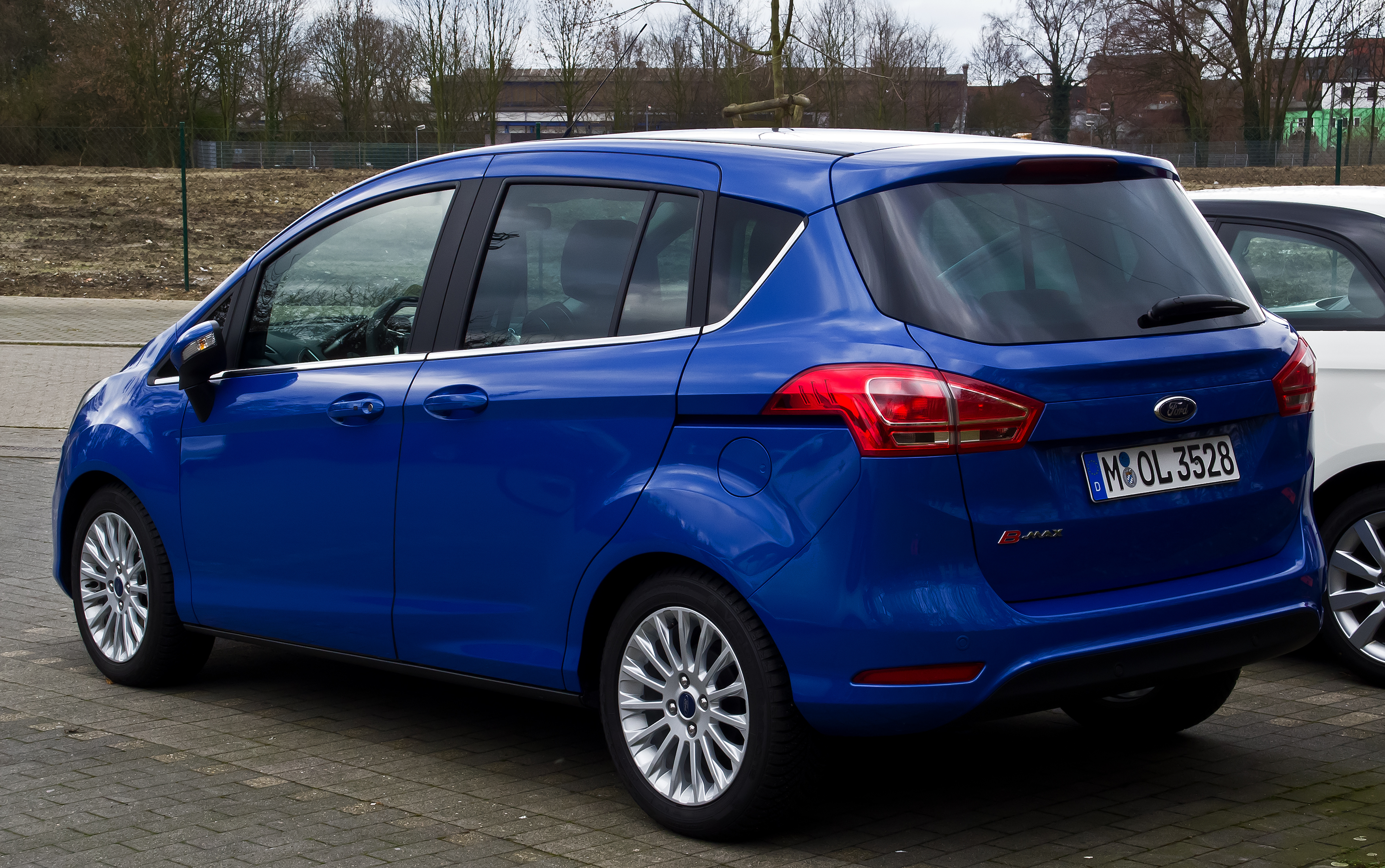
Ford B-Max Titanium

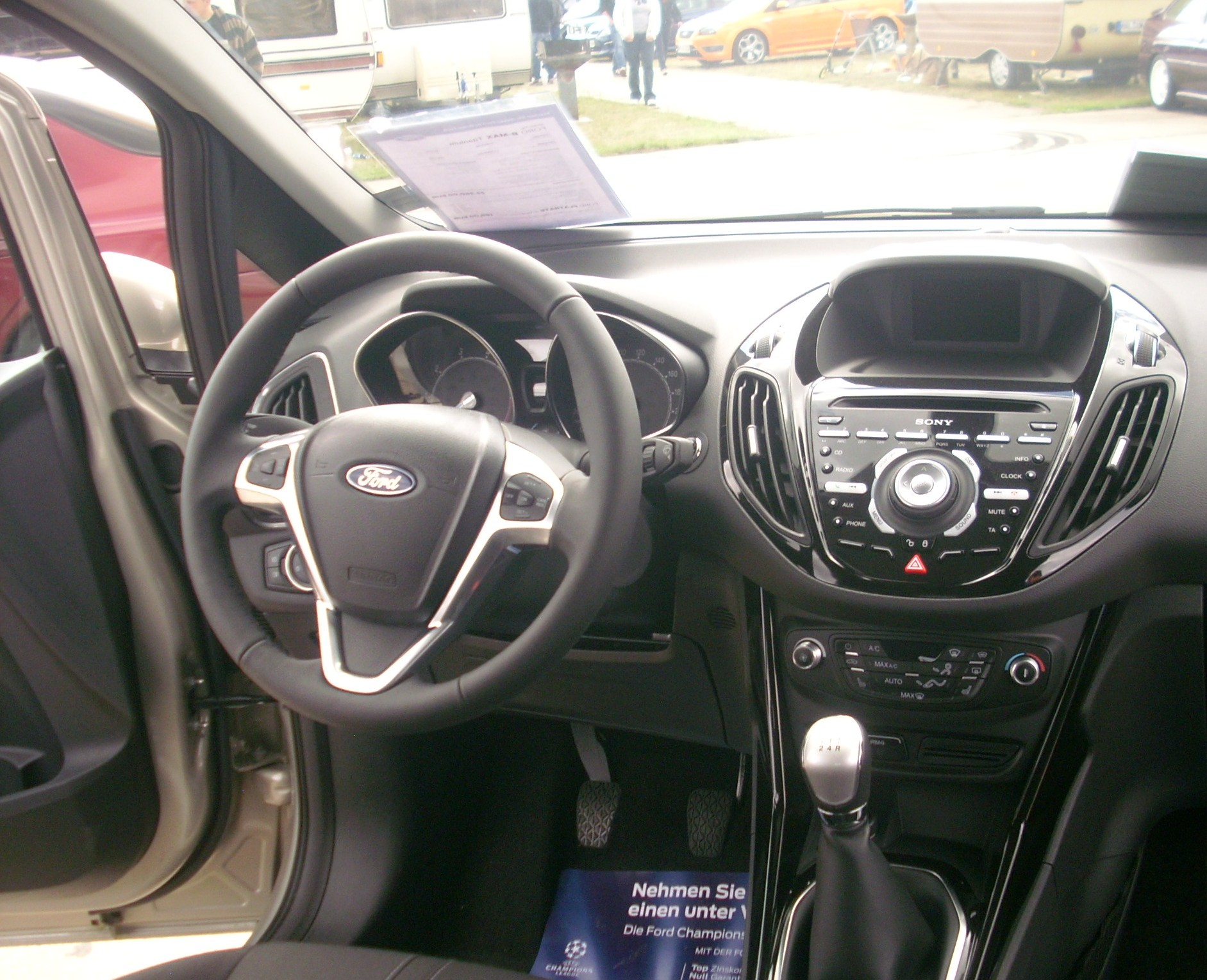
Interior

== Technology ==
The B-Max features the "Intelligent Protection" system. It also featured Ford's Torque Vectoring Control, which improves handling and agility, and the SYNC and Fold Flat systems. Ford's Emergency Assistance feature alerts local emergency services operators after an accident, in the correct language for the region. It was available in more than thirty countries, mostly in Europe.

== Safety ==
The Ford B-Max was tested by Euro NCAP in September 2012, receiving a five star safety rating.

| Test | Score | Points |
| Overall: | 5/5 stars | N/A |
| Adult occupant: | 92% | 33 |
| Child occupant: | 84% | 41 |
| Pedestrian: | 67% | 24 |
| Safety assist: | 71% | 5 |

== Reviews ==
The Telegraph reviewed the B-Max on 28 August 2012. The reviewer, Andrew English, gave the car a 4 out of 5 stars, and his verdict was that it “brings something new and useful to the market”.

What Car? magazine rated the B-Max with 4 out of 5 (later 3 out of 5) stars, giving the car a positive review.

== Engines ==
| Engine | Type | Displacement | Power | Torque | 0–100 km/h | Top speed | Combined consumption | CO_{2} emissions |
Petrol engines
| 1.0 Ecoboost | I3 | 999 cc | 101 PS (74 kW) | 169 N⋅m (125 lb⋅ft) at 1,400–4000 rpm | 13.2 s | 175 km/h (109 mph) | 4.9 L/100 km (58 mpg_{‑imp}; 48 mpg_{‑US}) | 112 g/km |
| 1.0 Ecoboost | I3 | 999 cc | 120 PS (88 kW) | 201 N⋅m (148 lb⋅ft) at 1,400–4500 rpm | 11.2 s | 188 km/h (117 mph) | 4.9 L/100 km (58 mpg_{‑imp}; 48 mpg_{‑US}) | 112 g/km |
| 1.4 Duratec | I4 | 1,388 cc | 90 PS (66 kW) | 127 N⋅m (94 lb⋅ft) at – rpm | 13.8 s | 171 km/h (106 mph) | 6.0 L/100 km (47 mpg_{‑imp}; 39 mpg_{‑US}) | 139 g/km |
| 1.6 Duratec | I4 | 1,596 cc | 105 PS (77 kW) | 150 N⋅m (111 lb⋅ft) at – rpm | 12.1 s | 180 km/h (112 mph) | 6.4 L/100 km (44 mpg_{‑imp}; 37 mpg_{‑US}) | 149 g/km |
Diesel engines
| 1.5 Duratorq | I4 | 1,498 cc | 75 PS (55 kW) | 190 N⋅m (140 lb⋅ft) at – rpm | 16.5 s | 158 km/h (98 mph) | 4.1 L/100 km (69 mpg_{‑imp}; 57 mpg_{‑US}) | 109 g/km |
| 1.5 Duratorq | I4 | 1,498 cc | 95 PS (70 kW) | 215 N⋅m (159 lb⋅ft) at – rpm | 13.0 s | 174 km/h (108 mph) | 4.0 L/100 km (71 mpg_{‑imp}; 59 mpg_{‑US}) | 98 g/km |
| 1.6 Duratorq | I4 | 1,560 cc | 97 PS (71 kW) | 215 N⋅m (159 lb⋅ft) at – rpm | 13.9 s | 173 km/h (107 mph) | 4.7 L/100 km (60 mpg_{‑imp}; 50 mpg_{‑US}) | 104 g/km |

== Sales ==
| Year | Europe |
|---|---|
| 2012 | 15,871 |
| 2013 | 68,557 |
| 2014 | 53,889 |
| 2015 | 46,147 |
| 2016 | 40,474 |
| 2017 | 43,339 |
| 2018 | 3,545 |
| 2019 | 3 |
