= Ford Sigma engine =

Ford Sigma Engine
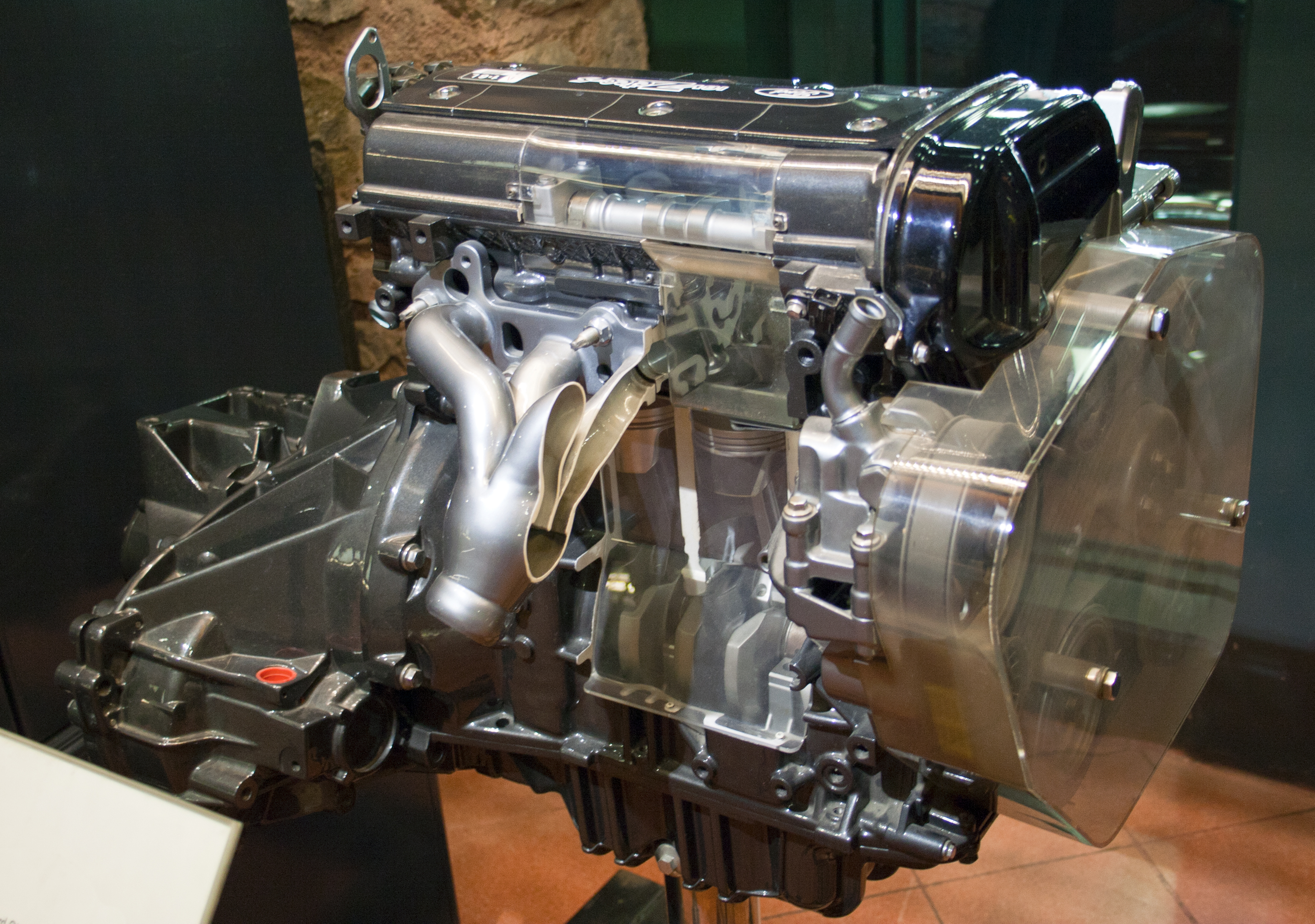

Overview
- Manufacturer: Ford Motor Company, Yamaha Motor Company
- Also called: Zetec-S; Zetec-SE; Duratec; Duratec Ti-VCT
- Production: 1995–present

Layout
- Configuration: I4
- Displacement: 1.2 L; 75.8 cu in (1,242 cc); 1.4 L; 84.7 cu in (1,388 cc); 1.5 L; 91.5 cu in (1,499 cc); 1.6 L; 97.4 cu in (1,596 cc); 1.7 L; 102.5 cu in (1,679 cc)
- Cylinder bore: 71.9 mm (2.83 in); 76 mm (2.99 in); 79 mm (3.11 in); 80 mm (3.15 in)
- Piston stroke: 76.5 mm (3.01 in); 81.4 mm (3.20 in); 83.5 mm (3.29 in)
- Cylinder block material: aluminium
- Cylinder head material: aluminium
- Valvetrain: SOHC 2 valves x cyl. DOHC 4 valves x cyl. w/Ti-VCT
- Compression ratio: 10.0:1, 10.3:1, 11.0:1, 11.8:1

Combustion
- Supercharger: On 2002 1.0-litre Ford Fiesta
- Fuel system: Electronic fuel injection Sequential multi-port FI
- Management: PCM, Siemens
- Fuel type: gasoline
- Oil system: Pressure-fed with full flow oil filter
- Cooling system: Water-cooled

Output
- Power output: 60–155 PS (44–114 kW; 59–153 hp)
- Torque output: 109–162 N⋅m (80–119 lb⋅ft)

Dimensions
- Dry weight: 81 kg (179 lb) (1.6 L Zetec); 90 kg (198 lb) (1.6 L Duratec)

Emissions
- Emissions target standard: Euro 4, Euro 5
- Emissions control systems: Close-coupled, closed loop, three-way catalyst with oxygen sensor

Chronology
- Predecessor: CVH Engine; Valencia-HCS engine
- Successor: Ford EcoBoost engine

The Ford Sigma is a small straight four automobile engine introduced in 1995 by Ford Motor Company. Its first evolution was sold as the Zetec-S (not to be confused with the trim level), then Zetec-SE and finally, in later years, renamed Duratec. The last upgrade of the engine is named Duratec Ti-VCT. Conceived for Ford's smaller models, the motor was intended to replace the older HCS (a derivative of the even older Kent unit) and smaller capacity CVH units.

== Introduction and production ==
As with the SHO V6 engine, development of the Zetec-S was a collaborative effort between Ford, Mazda and Yamaha. The engine's sound profile was refined in Ford's acoustics center in Cologne-Merkenich, Germany. Production of the Zetec-SE was carried out in the Ford Valencia Engine Plant, with Yamaha building the 1.7 L engine blocks in Japan.

When the Zetec-SE debuted in 1995, it included many firsts, including a plastic inlet manifold, a "ladder" style main bearing and crankcase assembly, and big-end bearing caps which are forged in one piece and subsequently split. It also incorporates powder metal connecting rods, which were quite exotic at the time. This feature makes the engine more challenging to rebuild at the end of its working life, since it is not possible to re-machine the bearing ladder as is done with a conventional cylinder block — the entire assembly has to be renewed. Despite this, engine tuners have found novel ways to increase the power of the unit through use of different valves and increasing the compression ratio of the engine through skimming of the cylinder head.

The engine first appeared in the Mk4 Ford Fiesta and the virtually identical Mazda 121 in 1.2 L (1,242 cc) capacity, with 1.4 L (1,388 cc), 1.6 litres (1,596 cc) and 1.7 L (1,679 cc) derivatives coming later.

== Difference between Zetec-SE/Zetec-S/Duratec/Duratec Ti-VCT ==
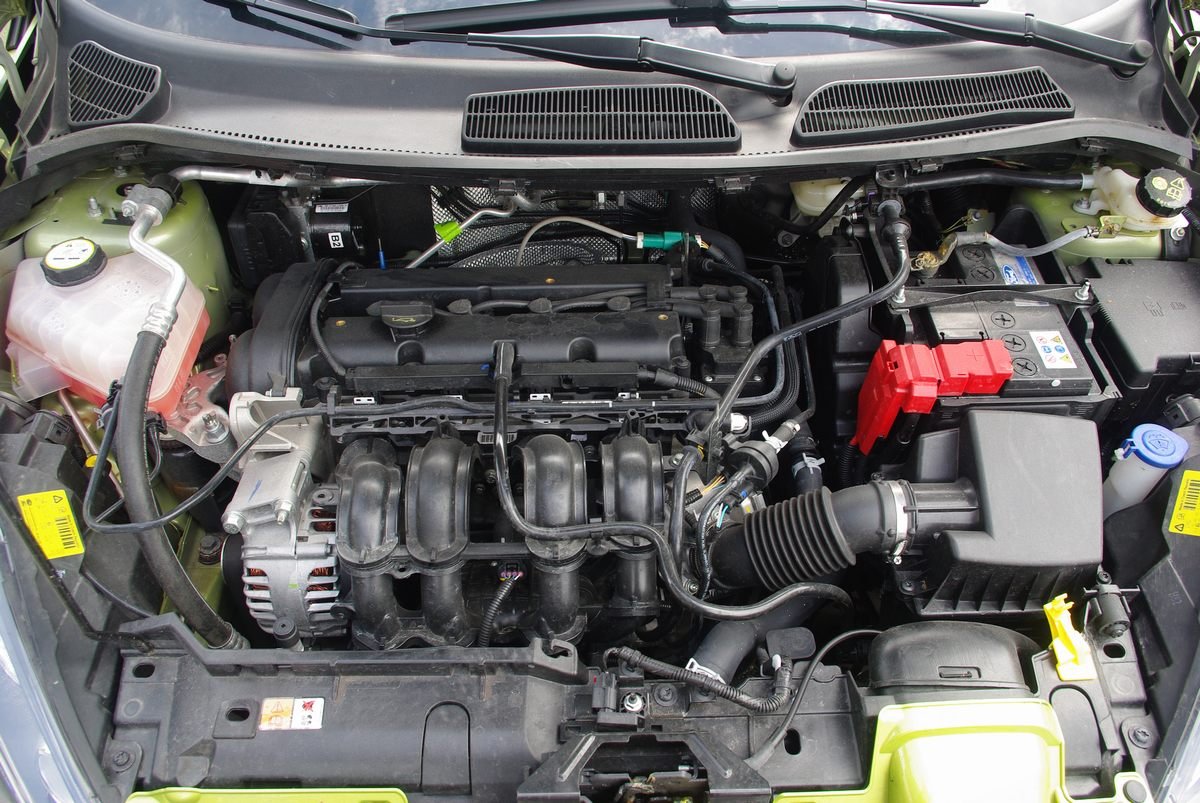
1.25-litre Duratec engine in a 2009 Ford Fiesta

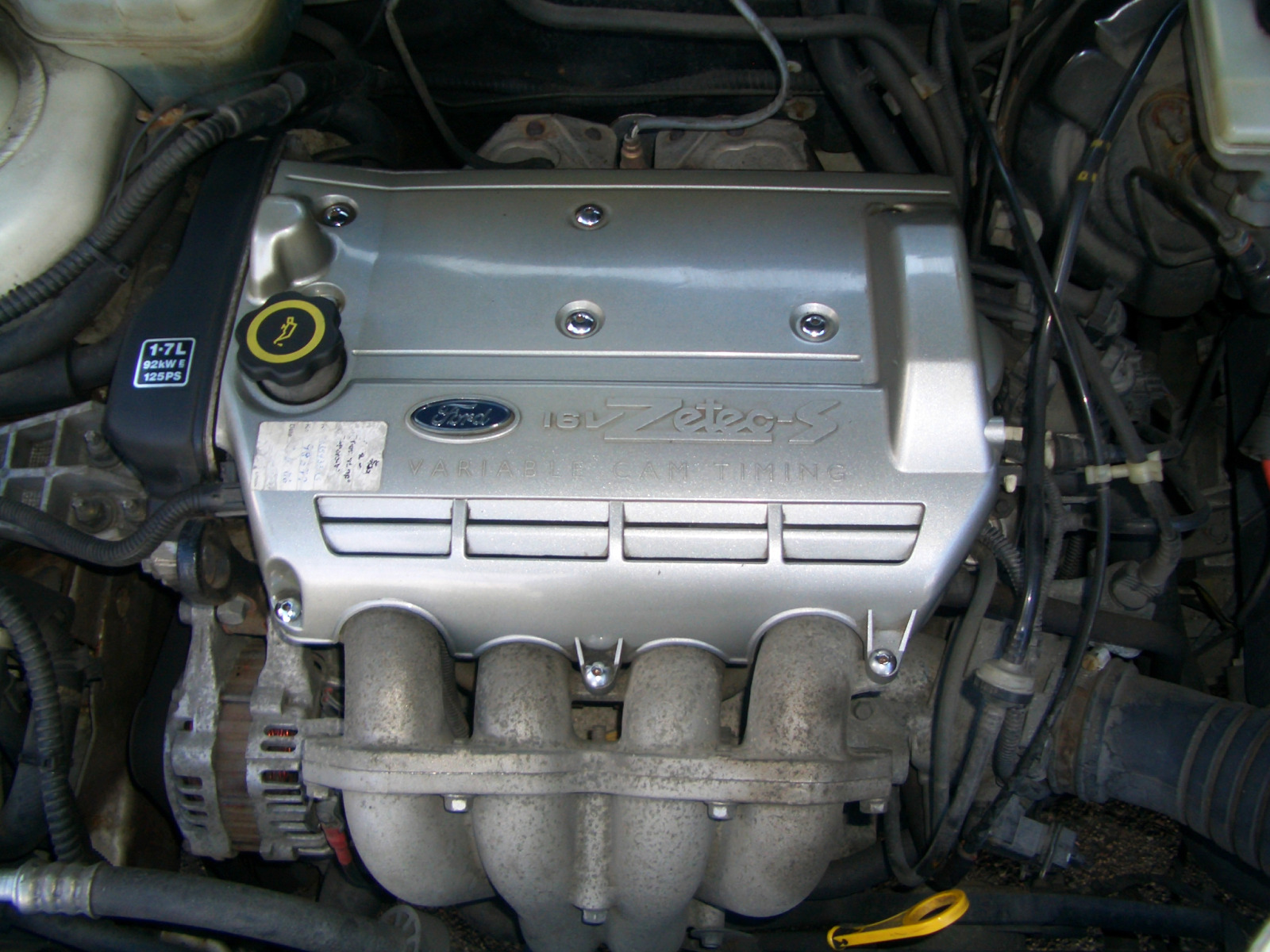
1.7-litre Zetec-S engine in a Ford Puma

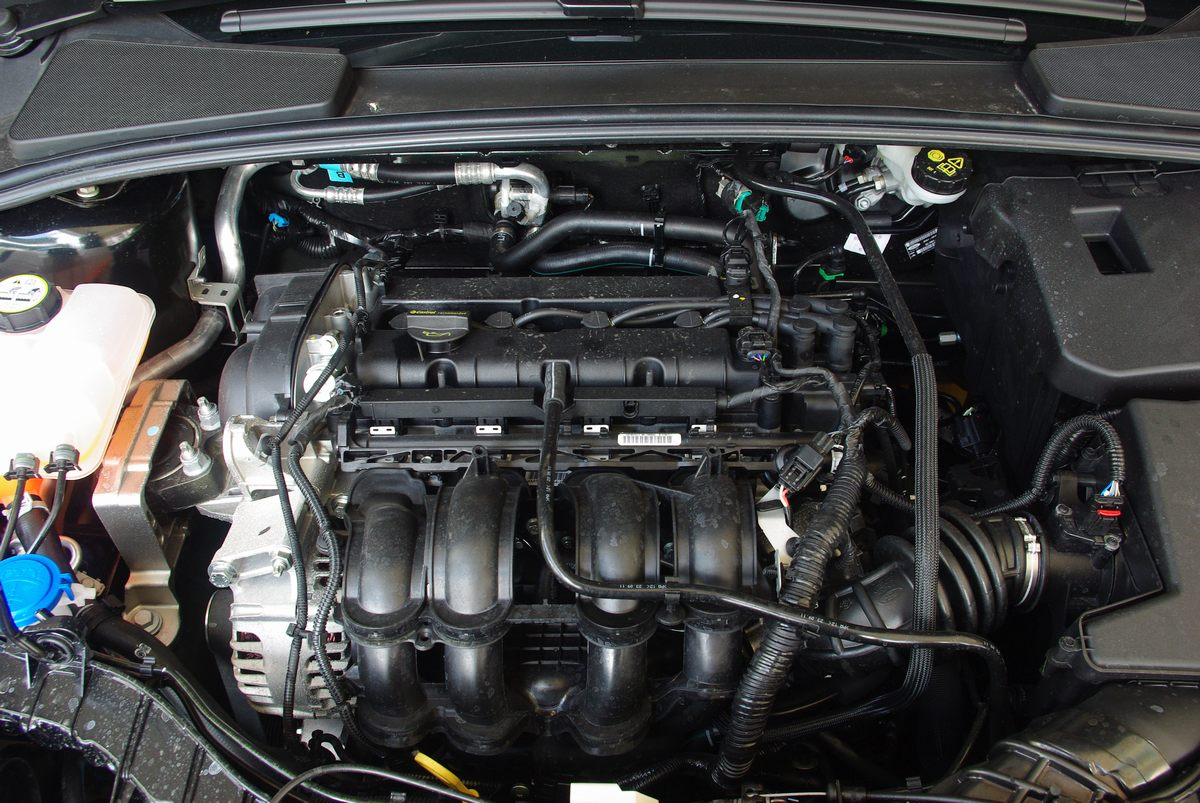
1.6-litre Duratec engine with TI-VCT in a 2012 Ford Focus

The Sigma engine was introduced under the Zetec-S name; after the upgrade it was renamed to Zetec-SE, Duratec and Duratec Ti-VCT. The latest upgrade of Sigma is called Ecoboost 1.6 engine (Not to be confused with the smaller 1.0 or larger 2.0/2.3 engines)

== Zetec-S/SE ==
Code	Years	Displacement	Bore x stroke	Power at rpm	Torque at rpm	Compression
1.25 Zetec-S/SE	1995–	1.2 L; 75.8 cu in (1,242 cc)	71.9 mm × 76.5 mm (2.83 in × 3.01 in)	75 PS (55 kW; 74 hp) at 5200	110 N⋅m (81 lb⋅ft) at 4000	10.0:1
1.4 Zetec-S/SE	1998–	1.4 L; 84.7 cu in (1,388 cc)	76 mm × 76.5 mm (2.99 in × 3.01 in)	75 PS (55 kW; 74 hp) at 5000	124 N⋅m (91 lb⋅ft) at 3500	11.0:1
1.4 Zetec-S/SE	1995–	1.4 L; 84.7 cu in (1,388 cc)	76 mm × 76.5 mm (2.99 in × 3.01 in)	90 PS (66 kW; 89 hp) at 5500	123 N⋅m (91 lb⋅ft) at 4000	10.3:1
1.6 Zetec-S/SE	1998–	1.6 L; 97.4 cu in (1,596 cc)	79 mm × 81.4 mm (3.11 in × 3.20 in)	100 PS (74 kW; 99 hp) at 6000	145 N⋅m (107 lb⋅ft) at 4000	11.0:1

== Zetec-S ==
1.7 Zetec-S VCT	1997–	1.7 L; 102.5 cu in (1,679 cc)	80 mm × 83.5 mm (3.15 in × 3.29 in)	125 PS (92 kW; 123 hp) at 6300	157 N⋅m (116 lb⋅ft) at 4500	10.3:1
1.7 Zetec-S VCT	1999–	1.7 L; 102.5 cu in (1,679 cc)	80 mm × 83.5 mm (3.15 in × 3.29 in)	155 PS (114 kW; 153 hp) at 7000	162 N⋅m (119 lb⋅ft) at 4500	10.3:1

The 1.7 L; 102.5 cu in (1,679 cc) engines uses a heavily modified 1.4 L engine block and features Variable Cam Timing on the inlet camshaft. This displacement has only been used in the Ford Puma. A 155 PS (114 kW; 153 hp) version of this engine was developed for the Ford Racing Puma with only 500 units built.

== Zetec RoCam ==
In 2000, Ford of Brazil developed a cheaper version of the Zetec-SE engine, to compete with the classic Volkswagen EA827 engine series known locally as Volkswagen AP (from Alta Performance, "High Performance" in English) engine in Brazil. It is 8v SOHC instead of 16v DOHC and its block is made of cast iron instead of aluminum. Also, its camshaft is driven by a chain instead of a belt. As a result this engine exhibits rougher behaviour, producing more vibration and noise.

On the other hand, it has a superb torque output thanks to the addition of the RoCam (Rollifinger Camshaft) feature. It's also a much smaller engine than the SE version, which allowed it to be installed on the Ford Ka, replacing the Endura-E engine which by that time was considered underpowered and outdated.

The engine also featured a new patented process for the aluminum head production, which resulted in a better alloy than those produced in Spain and UK, and at a lower production cost.

In 2002 a supercharged 1.0-litre 95 PS (70 kW; 94 hp) version was released for the Ford Fiesta, to compete with the 1.0 Turbo 16v 112 PS (82 kW; 110 hp) version of the Volkswagen Gol.

In 2001 the Zetec RoCam engine was introduced in Europe, but labeled as Duratec 8v, for the Ka and Fiesta. Later a 1.6-litre version was also released for the SportKa and StreetKa. The European versions of the engine are produced in the South Africa plant.

In October/2004 a newer bi-fuel version was introduced labeled "1.6 L Flex", capable of running on both petrol and ethanol, even mixed at any proportion. This version also featured a high compression ratio of 12.3:1 and "Compound High Turbulence" chambers, as used on the CHT engine. The 1.0 L Flex runs with a compression of 12.8:1.

Currently, this engine powers nearly all Brazilian Ford models – except those with 2.0 litre engines – in many different variants:

- 101/106 hp 1.6 L Flex (Ford Ka)
- 71/73 hp 1.0 L Flex (Ford Fiesta), 69/73 hp 1.0 L Flex after 2012 in Brazil
- 105/111 hp 1.6 L Flex (Ford Fiesta/ Fiesta Sedan), (Ford Focus), Ford EcoSport)

=== Applications ===
1.6 or 1.6 L; 97.4 or 97.5 cu in (1,596 or 1,597 cc) applications:

- 2003—2008 Ford SportKa 1.6, 95 PS (70 kW; 94 hp) and 100 lb⋅ft (136 N⋅m)
- 2003—2006 Ford StreetKa 1.6, 95 PS (70 kW; 94 hp) and 100 lb⋅ft (136 N⋅m)

== Duratec ==
After an upgrade to the Sigma, Ford renamed it the Duratec.

Code	Years	Displacement	Bore x stroke	Power	Torque	Compression
1.25 Duratec	2008–	1.2 L; 75.8 cu in (1,242 cc)	71.9 mm × 76.5 mm (2.83 in × 3.01 in)	60 PS (44 kW; 59 hp)	109 N⋅m (80 lb⋅ft)	11.0:1
1.25 Duratec	2008–	1.2 L; 75.8 cu in (1,242 cc)	71.9 mm × 76.5 mm (2.83 in × 3.01 in)	80 PS (59 kW; 79 hp)	114 N⋅m (84 lb⋅ft)	11.0:1
1.4 Duratec	2002–	1.4 L; 84.7 cu in (1,388 cc)	76 mm × 76.5 mm (2.99 in × 3.01 in)	80 PS (59 kW; 79 hp) at 5700	124 N⋅m (91 lb⋅ft) at 3500	11.0:1
1.4 Duratec	2008–	1.4 L; 84.7 cu in (1,388 cc)	76 mm × 76.5 mm (2.99 in × 3.01 in)	96 PS (71 kW; 95 hp)	125 N⋅m (92 lb⋅ft)	11.0:1
1.6 Duratec	2004–	1.6 L; 97.4 cu in (1,596 cc)	79 mm × 81.4 mm (3.11 in × 3.20 in)	100 PS (74 kW; 99 hp) at 6000	150 N⋅m (111 lb⋅ft) at 4000	11.0:1

Duratec technical details
Engine	2008 1.25 Duratec 60/82 hp (61 kW; 83 PS); 2008 1.4 Duratec 96 hp (72 kW; 97 PS)	2007 1.4 Duratec 80 hp (60 kW; 81 PS)	2007 1.6 Duratec 100 hp (75 kW; 101 PS)
Vehicle	Fiesta Mk6	Focus MkII face-lift	Focus MkII face-lift
Valve gear	DOHC, mechanical tappets, belt drive		
Valves per cylinder	4		
Camshaft drive	Belt		
Crankshaft	Spheroidal		
Crankshaft bearings	5		
Engine management	Siemens		
Fuel injection	EFI		
Ignition	Electronic distributor-less, wasted spark		
Emission control	Close-coupled, closed loop, three-way catalyst with oxygen sensor		
Emission level	Euro4		
Lubrication system	Pressure-fed lubrication system with full flow oil filter		
Lubrication system capacity with/without filter (L)	3.8/3.5		4.1/3.75
Cooling system	Water pump with thermostat and valves		
Cooling system capacity, incl. heater	5.5		5.8
Fuel type	ULP		
Fuel grade	95 RON		

== Duratec Ti-VCT ==
The 1.6 L; 97.4 cu in (1,596 cc) Ti-VCT (Twin independent Variable Camshaft Timing) version includes variable valve timing, and generates more power and torque than non-VVT counterparts. Latest versions comply with the Euro5 emission level.

Code	Years	Displacement	Bore x stroke	Power	Torque	Compression
1.5 Duratec Ti-VCT	2013–	1.5 L; 91.5 cu in (1,499 cc)	79 mm × 76.5 mm (3.11 in × 3.01 in)	112 PS (82 kW; 110 hp) at 6300	140 N⋅m (103 lb⋅ft) at 4300	11.0:1
1.6 Duratec Ti-VCT	2004–	1.6 L; 97.4 cu in (1,596 cc)	79 mm × 81.4 mm (3.11 in × 3.20 in)	115 PS (85 kW; 113 hp) at 6000	155 N⋅m (114 lb⋅ft) at 4150	11.0:1
1.6 Duratec Ti-VCT	2007–	1.6 L; 97.4 cu in (1,596 cc)	79 mm × 81.4 mm (3.11 in × 3.20 in)	110 PS (81 kW; 108 hp) at 6000	152 N⋅m (112 lb⋅ft) at 4050	11.0:1
1.6 Duratec Ti-VCT	2007–	1.6 L; 97.4 cu in (1,596 cc)	79 mm × 81.4 mm (3.11 in × 3.20 in)	125 PS (92 kW; 123 hp) at 6300	160 N⋅m (118 lb⋅ft) at 4100	11.0:1
1.6 Duratec Ti-VCT	2008–	1.6 L; 97.4 cu in (1,596 cc)	79 mm × 81.4 mm (3.11 in × 3.20 in)	120 PS (88 kW; 118 hp) at 6300	160 N⋅m (118 lb⋅ft) at 4100	11.0:1
1.6 Duratec Ti-VCT	2010–	1.6 L; 97.4 cu in (1,596 cc)	79 mm × 81.4 mm (3.11 in × 3.20 in)	105 PS (77 kW; 104 hp) at 6000	150 N⋅m (111 lb⋅ft) at 4000–4500	11.0:1
1.6 Duratec Ti-VCT	2011–	1.6 L; 97.4 cu in (1,596 cc)	79 mm × 81.4 mm (3.11 in × 3.20 in)	134 PS (99 kW; 132 hp) at 6700	160 N⋅m (118 lb⋅ft) at 4250	11.0:1

Duratec Ti-VCT technical details
Engine	2007 1.6 Duratec Ti-VCT 110 hp (82 kW; 112 PS); 2007 1.6 Duratec Ti-VCT 125 hp (93 kW; 127 PS); 2008 1.6 Duratec Ti-VCT 120 hp (89 kW; 122 PS); 2010 1.6 Duratec Ti-VCT 120 hp (89 kW; 122 PS)	2007 1.6 Duratec Ti-VCT 115 hp (86 kW; 117 PS)	2011 1.6 Duratec Ti-VCT 105 hp (78 kW; 106 PS)/125 hp (93 kW; 127 PS)
Vehicle	Mondeo; Mondeo face-lift Fiesta Mk6	Focus MkII face-lift	Focus MkIII
Valve gear	DOHC, tappets	DOHC	DOHC, twin independent variable cam timing
Valves per cylinder	4		
Included angle between valves	41.75°		
Valve sizes	Intake 30 mm (1.2 in), exhaust 24.1 mm (0.95 in)		
Camshaft drive	Belt		Belt with dynamic tensioner
Crankshaft	4 counter-weights		Cast iron, 4 counter-weights
Crankshaft bearings		5	
Engine management	Siemens ECM EMS2101 16-bit	Siemens	Siemens ECM EMS2101 16-bit
Fuel injection	EFI		
Ignition	Tower coil	Electronic distributor-less	
Emission control	Hego/CMS dual binary sensors	Close-coupled, closed loop, three-way catalyst with oxygen sensor	
Emission level	Euro4		Euro5
Lubrication system		Pressure-fed lubrication system with full flow oil filter	
Lubrication system capacity with/without filter (L)		4.1/3.75	4.1/
Cooling system		Water pump with thermostat and valves	
Cooling system capacity, incl. heater		6.0	5.5
Fuel type	ULP		
Fuel grade	95 RON		

== Crate engine versions ==
Crate engine versions of Zetec-SE engines are sold by Ford Power Products under the name ZSG Range.

Code	Years	Displacement	Bore x stroke	Power at rpm	torque at rpm	Compression
ZSG 414	?–	1.4 L; 84.7 cu in (1,388 cc)	76 mm × 76.5 mm (2.99 in × 3.01 in)	75 PS (55 kW; 74 hp) at 5700	124 N⋅m (91 lb⋅ft) at 3500	11.0:1
ZSG 416	?–	1.6 L; 97.3 cu in (1,595 cc)	79 mm × 81.4 mm (3.11 in × 3.20 in)	100 PS (74 kW; 99 hp) at 6000	146 N⋅m (108 lb⋅ft) at 4000	11.0:1

== Applications ==
Displacement	ratings	vehicles
1.2 L; 75.8 cu in (1,242 cc)	60 PS (44 kW; 59 hp), 109 N⋅m (80 lb⋅ft)	2008–2017 Ford Fiesta Mk6
1.2 L; 75.8 cu in (1,242 cc)	75 PS (55 kW; 74 hp) at 6000, 110 N⋅m (81 lb⋅ft) at 4000	1995–2002 Ford Fiesta Mk4 1.25; 2002–2008 Ford Fiesta Mk5 1.25; 2002–2007 Mazda2 (DY) 1.25
1.2 L; 75.8 cu in (1,242 cc)	80 PS (59 kW; 79 hp), 114 N⋅m (84 lb⋅ft)	2008–2017 Ford Fiesta Mk6
1.4 L; 84.7 cu in (1,388 cc)	75 PS (55 kW; 74 hp), 124 N⋅m (91 lb⋅ft)	1998–2004 Ford Focus Mk 1 1.4
1.4 L; 84.7 cu in (1,388 cc)	80 PS (59 kW; 79 hp) at 5700, 124 N⋅m (91 lb⋅ft) at 3500	2002–2008 Ford Fiesta Mk5 1.4; 2002–2010 Ford Fusion 1.4; 2002–2007 Mazda2 (DY) 1.4
1.4 L; 84.7 cu in (1,388 cc)	90 PS (66 kW; 89 hp), 125 N⋅m (92 lb⋅ft)	1995–2002 Ford Fiesta Mk4 1.4; 1997–2000 Ford Puma 1.4; 2012–2017 Ford B-Max 1.4
1.4 L; 84.7 cu in (1,388 cc)	96 PS (71 kW; 95 hp), 125 N⋅m (92 lb⋅ft)	2008–2019 Ford Fiesta Mk6
1.5 L; 91.5 cu in (1,499 cc) (with Ti-VCT)	112 PS (82 kW; 110 hp), 140 N⋅m (103 lb⋅ft)	2013–2023 Ford EcoSport 1.5; 2013–2019 Ford Fiesta Mk6 1.5
1.6 L; 97.4 cu in (1,596 cc)	100 PS (74 kW; 99 hp) at 6000, 145 N⋅m (107 lb⋅ft) at 4000	1998–2004 Ford Focus Mk 1 1.6; 1999–2002 Ford Fiesta Mk4 1.6; 2002–2008 Ford Fiesta Mk5 1.6; 2000–2002 Ford Puma 1.6; 2002–2010 Ford Fusion 1.6; 2002–2007 Mazda2 (DY) 1.6; 2004–2012 Volvo C30 1.6; 2004–2012 Volvo S40 1.6; 2004–2012 Volvo V50 1.6
1.6 L; 97.4 cu in (1,596 cc)	100 PS (74 kW; 99 hp) at 6000, 150 N⋅m (111 lb⋅ft) at 4000	2004–2011 Ford Focus Mk 2 1.6; 2003–2010 Ford Focus C-MAX 1.6; 2002–2008 Ford Fiesta Mk 5 1.6
1.6 L; 97.4 cu in (1,596 cc) (with Ti-VCT)	115 PS (85 kW; 113 hp) at 6000, 155 N⋅m (114 lb⋅ft) at 4150	2004–2011 Ford Focus Mk 2 1.6; 2004–2010 Ford C-MAX 1.6; 2007–2014 Ford Mondeo Mk3 1.6
1.6 L; 97.4 cu in (1,596 cc) (with Ti-VCT)	120 PS (88 kW; 118 hp) at 6000, 152 N⋅m (112 lb⋅ft) at 4050	2008–2019 Ford Fiesta Mk6
1.6 L; 97.4 cu in (1,596 cc) (with Ti-VCT)	105 PS (77 kW; 104 hp) at 6000, 150 N⋅m (111 lb⋅ft) at 4000–4500	2011–2019 Ford Focus Mk3 1.6; 2010–2019 Ford C-Max 1.6; 2012–2017 Ford B-Max 1.6
1.6 L; 97.4 cu in (1,596 cc) (with Ti-VCT)	110 PS (81 kW; 108 hp) at 6300, 160 N⋅m (118 lb⋅ft) at 4100	2007–2014 Ford Mondeo Mk4 1.6
1.6 L; 97.4 cu in (1,596 cc) (with Ti-VCT)	125 PS (92 kW; 123 hp) at 6000, 159 N⋅m (117 lb⋅ft) at 4000	2008–2014 Ford Mondeo Mk4 1.6; 2011–2019 Ford Focus Mk3 1.6; 2010–2019 Ford C-Max 1.6
1.7 L; 102.5 cu in (1,679 cc) (with VCT)	126 PS (93 kW; 124 hp) at 6300, 157 N⋅m (116 lb⋅ft) at 4500	1997–2002 Ford Puma 1.7
1.7 L; 102.5 cu in (1,679 cc) (with VCT)	155 PS (114 kW; 153 hp) at 7000, 162 N⋅m (119 lb⋅ft) at 4500	1999–2000 Ford Racing Puma 1.7

== Current use ==
The Ford Sigma engine was produced at Bridgend Ford in Wales, U.K. until September 2020 and at Taubate Engine and Transmission Plant, Taubate, São Paulo, Brazil. Today the Sigma engine is used as the basis for the four cylinder Ford Ecoboost 1.5 litre and 1.6 litre engines. A 110 bhp (82 kW; 112 PS) version was used by Morgan for their 4/4 Roadster coupled to a Mazda transmission from 2009 until the model was discontinued in 2018.

=== 1.25/1.4/1.6 L Sigma ===
These engines in the first generation Focus produced 75 and 100 brake horsepower (75 kW; 101 PS) respectively, but for MkII Focus the 1.4 variant was slightly modified and produced 80 brake horsepower (60 kW; 81 PS). Both engines have belt driven camshafts and Electronic Fuel Injection systems. They weigh 90 kilograms (198 lb). The 1.6 Ti-VCT was introduced in 2004, it features Variable Cam Timing; this 115 brake horsepower (86 kW; 117 PS) version is used in MkII Focus. A new 105 brake horsepower (78 kW; 106 PS) or 125 brake horsepower (93 kW; 127 PS) EU5 version is used in the MkIII Focus, also a 1.6 L 120 horsepower (89 kW; 122 PS) version is used in Ford Fiesta Zetec-S. The Sigma is usually coupled to the Ford IB5 five-speed manual transmission.

==== Brazil ====
Recently the Sigma engine was present in modern Brazilian versions of the Fiesta, Focus and Ecosport (1.6 L TI-VCT version) and a 1.5 version was used by Ka. This engine was able to use the flex technology.

Power with ethanol:

- 1.5 L Sigma (non TI-VCT) — IB5+ manual transmission
  - Fiesta (2014–2016) — 112 metric horsepower (82 kW; 110 hp)
  - Ka (2014–2021) — 110 metric horsepower (81 kW; 108 hp)
- 1.6 Sigma (non TI-VCT) — IB5+ manual transmission (both) and PowerShift (Fiesta Only).
  - Fiesta (2008–2014) — 116 metric horsepower (85 kW; 114 hp)
  - Ecosport (2012–2023) — 116 metric horsepower (85 kW; 114 hp)
- 1.6 Sigma TI-VCT — IB5+ manual transmission and PowerShift.
  - Focus (2013–2019) — 135 metric horsepower (99 kW; 133 hp)
  - Fiesta (2008–2014) — 128 metric horsepower (94 kW; 126 hp)
  - Ecosport (2012–2023) — 131 metric horsepower (96 kW; 129 hp)

- In 2018 the Sigma engine was replaced in all Ford compact/subcompact cars to the newer and stronger "Dragon" engine, displacing 1.5 L with a 3-Cylinder layout and with a power output of 136HP.

== Caterham usage ==
Some Caterham Cars use modified Ford Sigma engines such as the Caterham Seven 270, which uses a tuned Sigma engine producing 135 horsepower (101 kW; 137 PS) at 6,800 rpm as a modern equivalent to the original Ford Kent Crossflow engine used in the Lotus 7 from 1957 to 1972.
Ford Sigma 1.6-litre overview Technical features:

- a high level of running refinement and low emission levels
- aluminium alloy cylinder block and head
- cross flow cylinder head
- structural aluminium oil-pan for increased engine stiffness
- individual throttle bodies in place of the standard intake manifold
- twin overhead camshafts each with five bearings
- sequential multi-port fuel injection system
- long life, glass fibre reinforced camshaft drive belt with automatic tensioner
- state-of-the-art Twin Independent Variable Camshaft Timing (on Ti-VCT variant)

Code	Displacement	Bore x stroke	Power at rpm	torque at rpm	Compression
Ford Sigma 1.6	1.6 L; 97.3 cu in (1,595 cc)	79 mm × 81.4 mm (3.11 in × 3.20 in)?	125 PS (92 kW; 123 hp) at 6100	162 N⋅m (119 lb⋅ft) at 5350	11.0:1
Ford Sigma 1.6	1.6 L; 97.3 cu in (1,595 cc)	79 mm × 81.4 mm (3.11 in × 3.20 in)?	150 PS (110 kW; 148 hp) at 6900	162 N⋅m (119 lb⋅ft) at 5600	11.0:1
Caterham Sigma 1.6 Ti-VCT EU4	1.6 L; 97.3 cu in (1,595 cc)	79 mm × 81.4 mm (3.11 in × 3.20 in)?	115 PS (85 kW; 113 hp) at 6000	155 N⋅m (114 lb⋅ft) at 4150	11.0:1

== SCCA Spec Racer ==
The third generation of the SCCA Spec Racer, commonly known as the Gen3 was introduced in 2015, and uses the 1.6 L Sigma engine. The engine is sold by SCCA Enterprises as a sealed unit.

== Zetec-E comparison ==
The Zetec-SE has no common parts or design with the larger Zetec-E engines apart from the name. This gives rise to some confusion since it suggests that they are members of the same family when they are, in fact, completely different. Zetec-E units are mounted transversely with the inlet manifold at the rear, whereas the Zetec-SE units are mounted with the inlet manifold at the front.

== Replacement ==
In 2012 Ford replaced the Sigma engine with a brand new 3-cylinder 1.0-litre EcoBoost engine for some markets and models. The new engine provides more power and torque with less fuel consumption and lower CO_{2} emissions.

== See also ==
- List of Ford engines
