= Ford Fusion (Europe) =

Multi-purpose car by Ford (2002–2012)

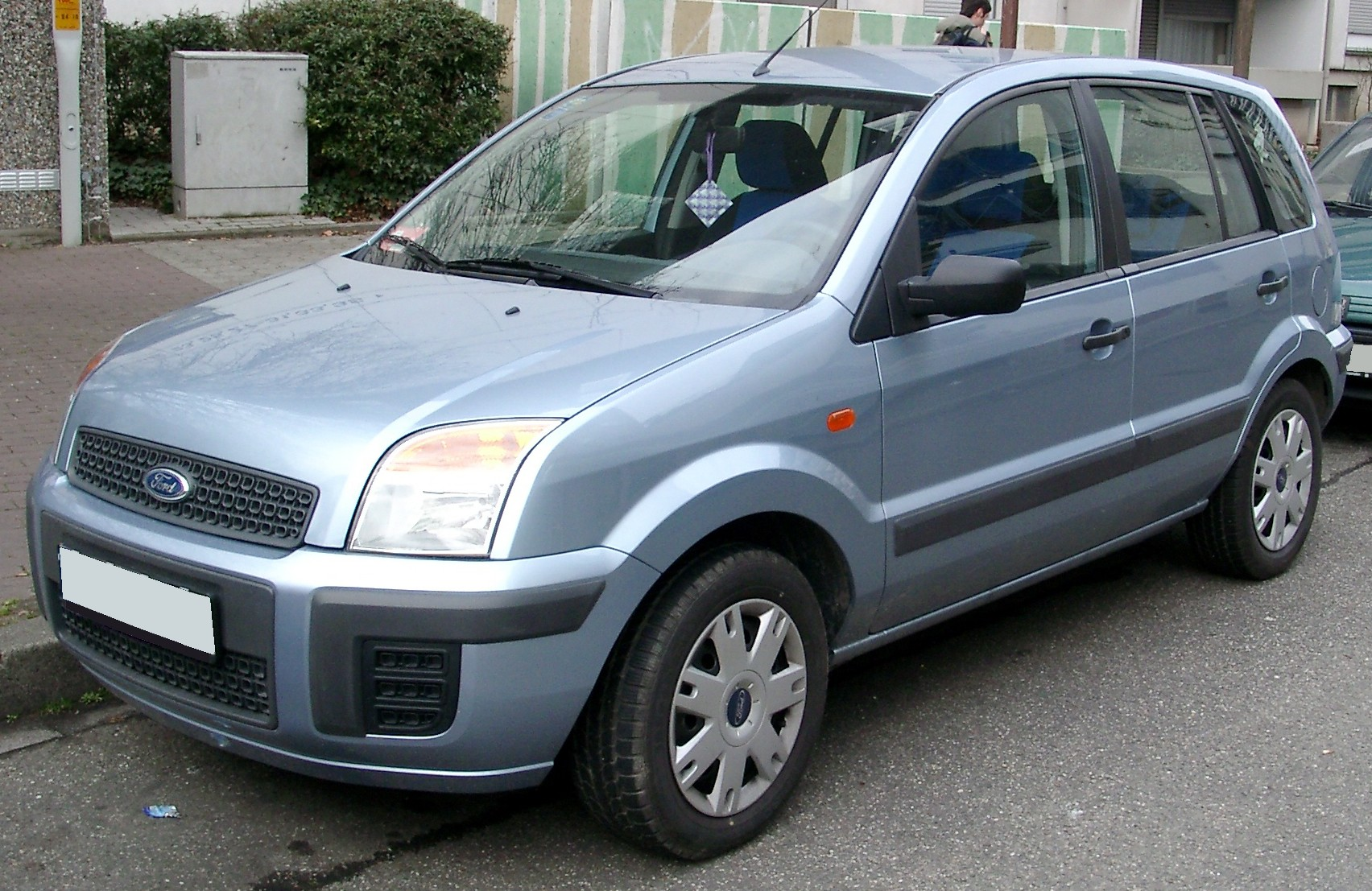

Overview
- Manufacturer: Ford Europe
- Production: 2002–2012
- Assembly: Germany: Cologne; India: Chennai
- Designer: Mark Adams

Body and chassis
- Class: Mini MPV (M)
- Body style: 5-door hatchback
- Layout: Front-engine, front-wheel-drive
- Platform: Ford B3 platform
- Related: Ford Fiesta Mk5; Ford EcoSport; Mazda2

Powertrain
- Engine: Petrol: 1.25 L Zetec-SE I4; 1.4 L Duratec I4; 1.6 L Duratec I4; Diesel: 1.4 L Duratorq TDCi I4; 1.6 L Duratorq TDCi I4 TDCi
- Transmission: 4-speed Aisin 80-40LE automatic (1.6 gasoline only); 5-speed DuraShift-EST automated manual (1.4 gasoline and diesel only); 5-speed iB5 Durashift manual

Dimensions
- Wheelbase: 2,490 mm (98.0 in)
- Length: 4,020 mm (158.3 in)
- Width: 1,710 mm (67.3 in)
- Height: 1,500 mm (59.1 in)

Chronology
- Successor: Ford B-MAX

The European Ford Fusion is a car manufactured and marketed by Ford Europe from 2002 to 2012 across a single generation. It has a high roof, five-door, five-passenger, front-wheel-drive, mini MPV design and is described in the motor industry as being part of the B-segment.

Sharing its platform with the Ford Fiesta Mk5 supermini, the Fusion was longer, wider and taller than the Fiesta — with high h-point seating, rear 'theatre-style' and 60/40 folding rear seats, fold-flat front passenger seat and a load floor flush with the cargo sill. Ford marketed the Fusion as an 'Urban Activity Vehicle', its Fusion nameplate referring to its combination of small hatchback, MPV and SUV design features: economical operation from its B-class underpinnings; enhanced maneuverability from its four-metre footprint as well as enhanced roominess, accessibility, passenger and cargo volume from its tall configuration — but notably without all-wheel drive.

Having debuted initially as a concept at the 2001 Geneva Motor Show and in production form at the same show in 2002, sales of the Fusion began in late 2002. The Fusion was manufactured at Ford's Cologne-Niehl assembly and exported to more than 50 countries, including Turkey and Russia.

Beginning in September 2005, Ford marketed a mildly facelifted Fusion with revised front and rear lights, bumper fascias, side mouldings, door mirrors, brighter exterior color palette, revised interior design with 'soft touch' materials and revised analogue instrument display.

Ford of Brazil and a number of Latin American countries marketed a crossover SUV variant as the Ford EcoSport with revised styling and increased ground clearance for light off-roading.

The Fusion received a four-star NCAP crash safety rating and was succeeded in September 2012 with the B-Max.

== Equipment ==
Options included power-folding mirrors, automatic and 'home safe' headlights, automatic windscreen wipers, Bluetooth with voice control, trip computer, MP3 player connectivity, and the Electronic Stability Program. In the United Kingdom, the car was available in Style+, Zetec and Titanium trim levels. (1, 2, 3, and '+' were the trim levels for the original Fusion).

Equipment on the entry-level 1 included central locking and dual front airbags. The 2 featured electric heated mirrors, electric front windows, a CD player, and air conditioning. The 3 added alloy wheels, front fog lights, and an alarm. The + model, introduced in June 2003 added larger alloys and privacy glass.

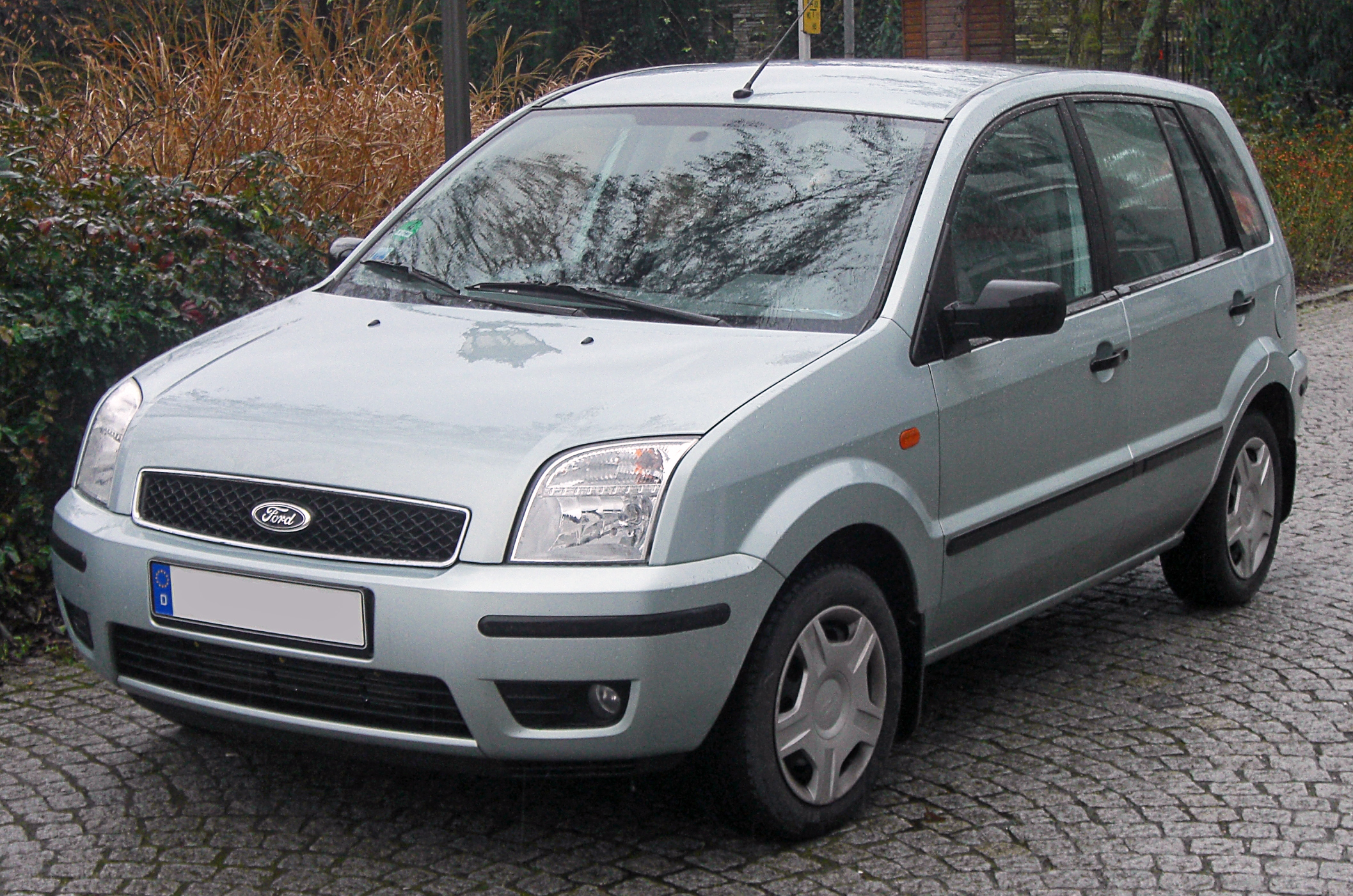
Ford Fusion (pre-facelift)

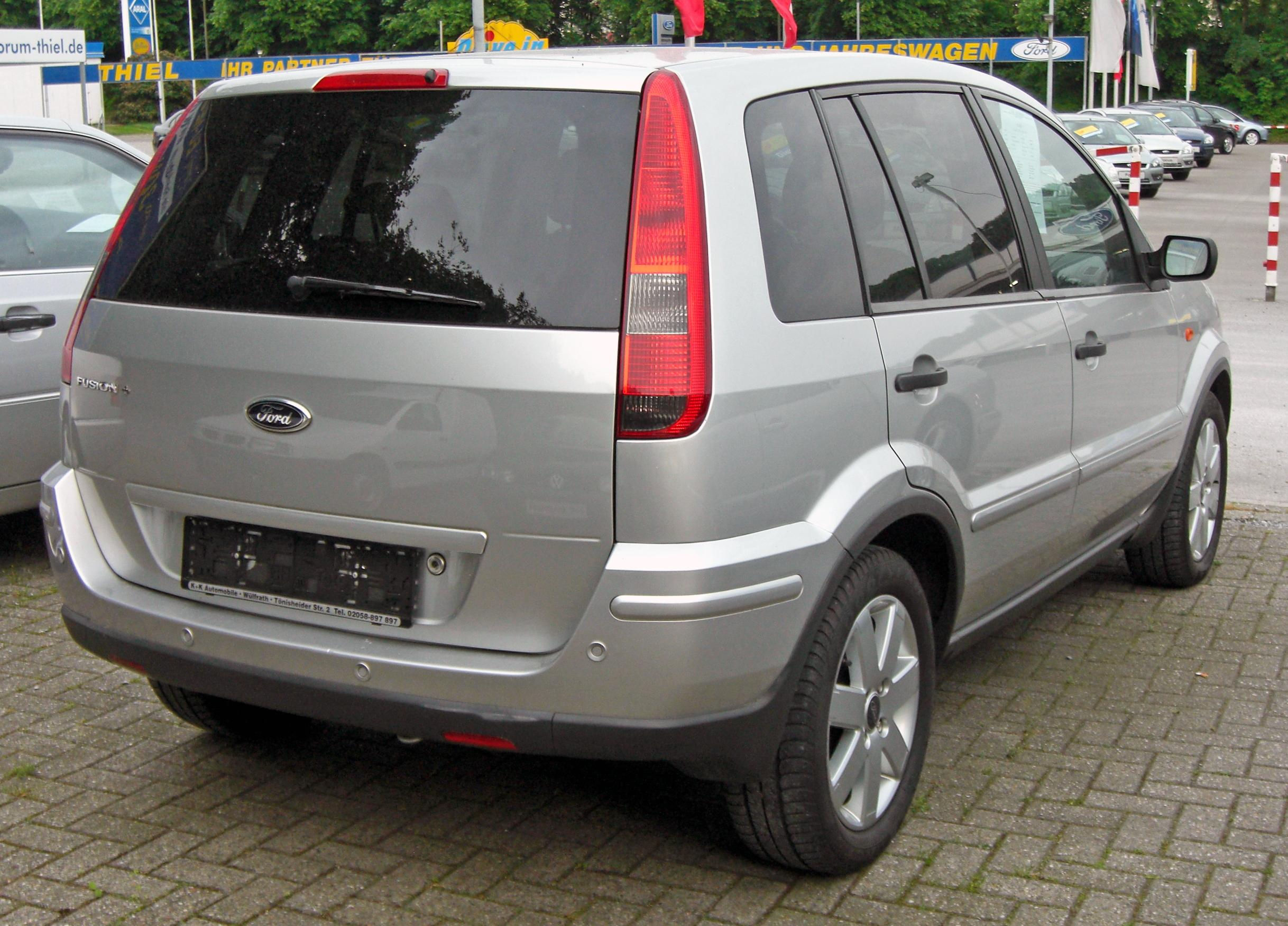
Ford Fusion (pre-facelift)

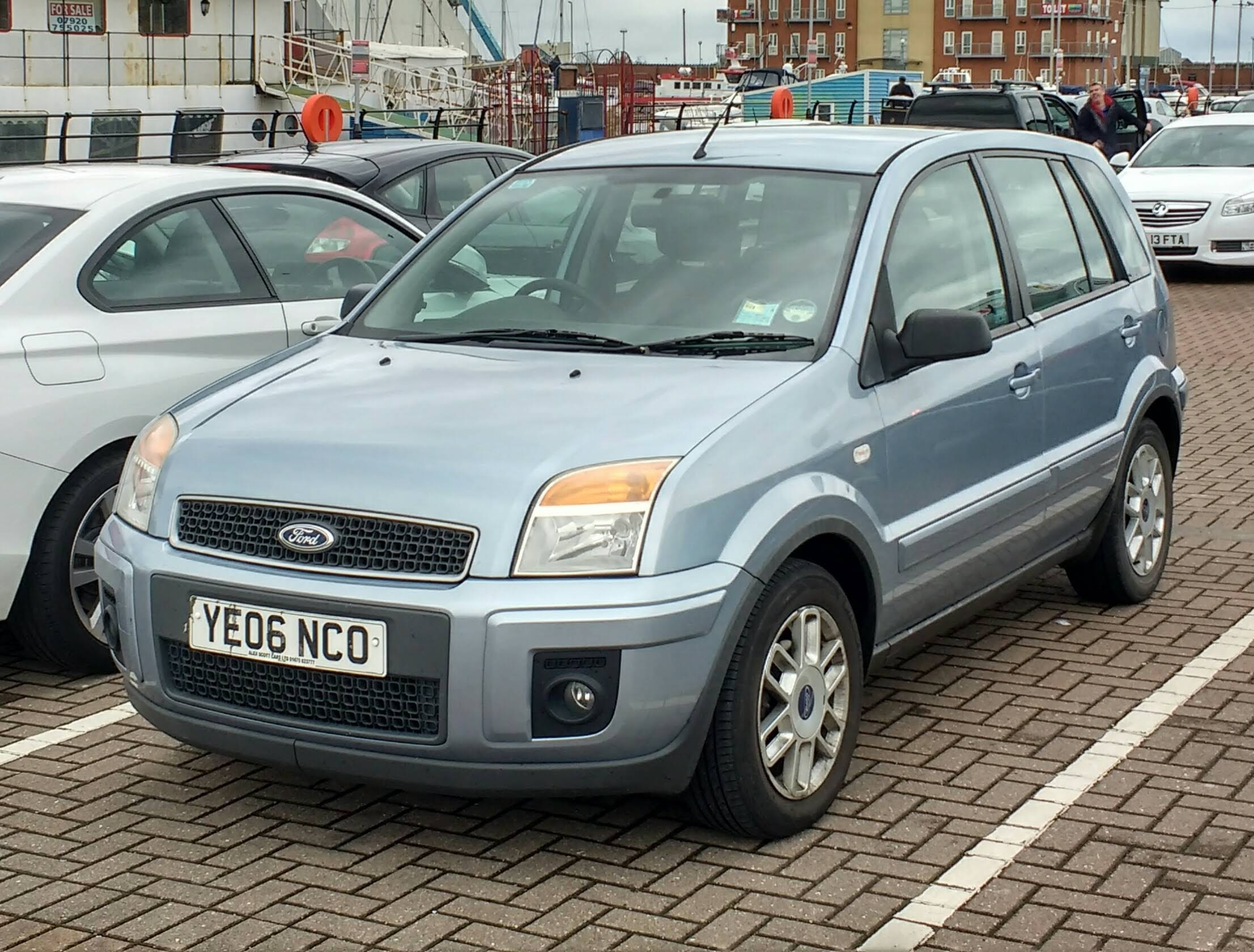
Ford Fusion (facelift)

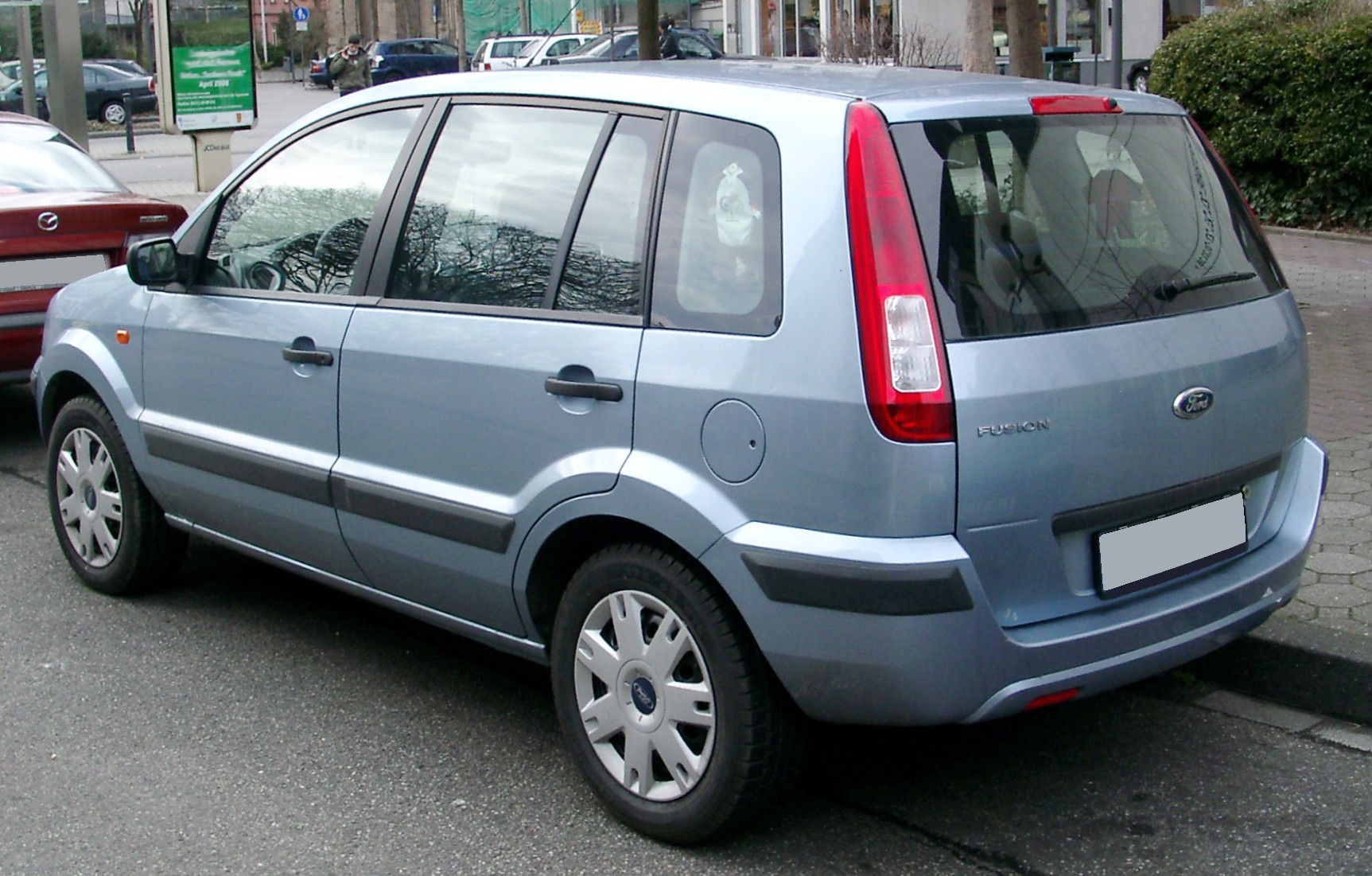
Ford Fusion (facelift)

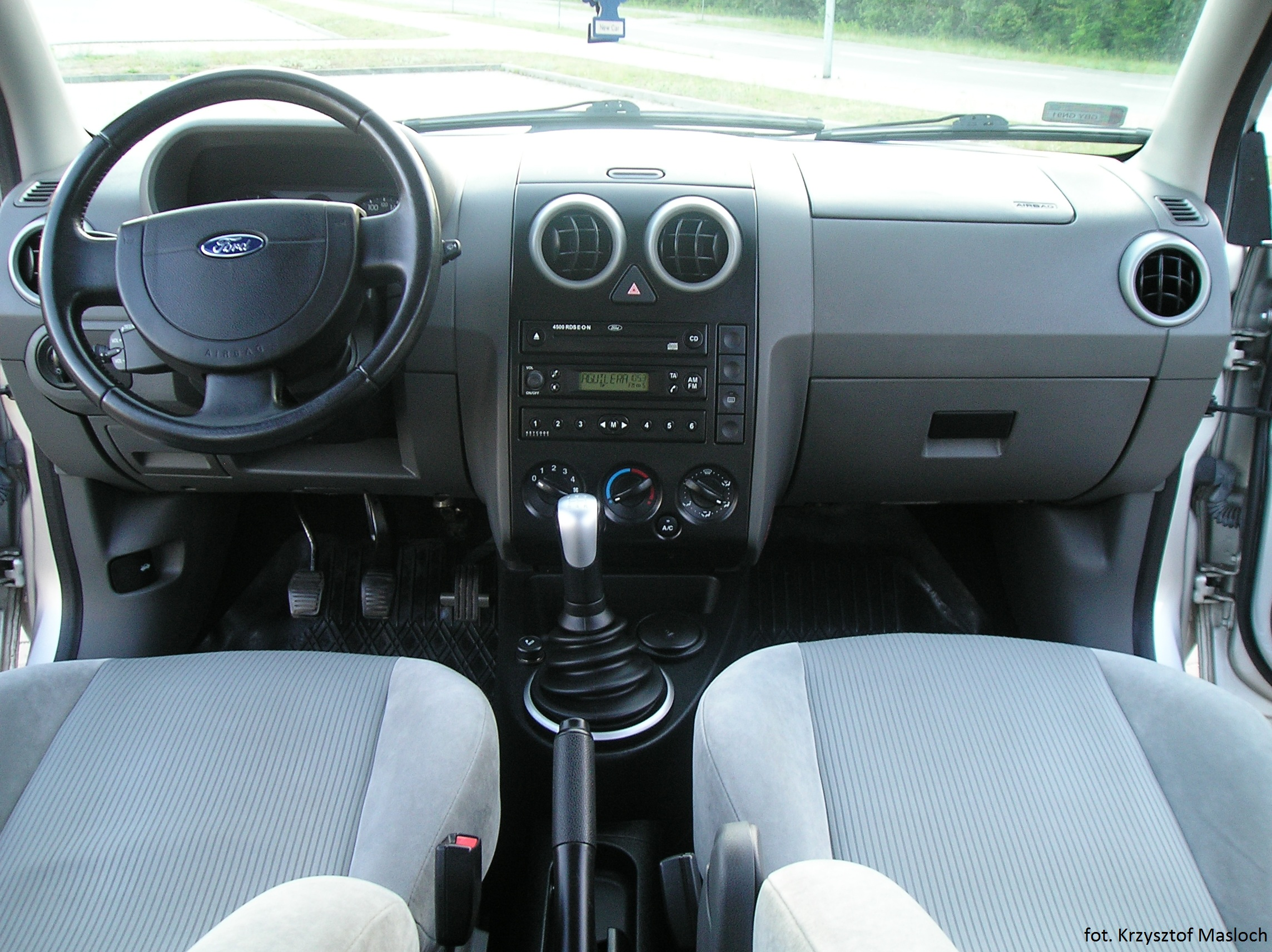
Ford Fusion 2002–2005 - interior

== Technical data ==
Model	1.25	1.4	1.6	1.4 TDCi	1.6 TDCi
Engine	4-cylinder 4-stroke in-line engine				
Displacement	1242 cm³	1388 cm³	1596 cm³	1399 cm³	1560 cm³
Max. power at engine speed	55 kW (74 hp; 75 PS); 6000 rpm	59 kW (80 PS); 5700 rpm	74 kW (101 PS); 6000 rpm	50 kW (68 PS); 4000 rpm	66 kW (90 PS); 4000 rpm
Max. torque at engine speed	110 Nm; 4000 rpm	124 Nm; 3500 rpm	146 Nm; 4000 rpm	160 Nm; 2000 rpm	204 Nm; 1750 rpm
Transmission	5-speed	5-speed or Durashift-EST	5-speed or 4-speed automatic	5-speed or Durashift-EST	5-speed
Top speed	159 km/h (99 mph)	163 km/h (101 mph); Durashift-EST: 164 km/h	178 km/h (111 mph) automatic: 176 km/h	158 km/h (98 mph); Durashift-EST: 158 km/h	176 km/h (109 mph)
Acceleration; 0–100 km/h	15.5 s	14.0 s Durashift-EST: 15.3	11.1 s automatic: 13.1 s	16.1 s Durashift-EST: 17.5 s	12.9 s
Fuel consumption in liters/100 km	6.4 S	6.5 S Durashift-EST: 6.3 S	6.6 S automatic: 7.6 S	4.6 D Durashift-EST: 4.5 D	4.5 D
CO_{2}-emissions in g/km	152	154; Durashift-EST: 149	157 automatic: 181	122; Durashift-EST: 119	119
