= Ford Durashift =

Automatic and manual transmission range

Durashift is the brand name of a range of Ford automatic and manual transmissions.

== Durashift EST ==
Durashift EST (Electronic Shift Transmission) features electronic control with manual selection of gears. It is an automated manual transmission with a shift and clutches electric actuator.

The 2000-2006 Ford Transit featured a 5-speed Durashift EST automatic transmission. It had different modes, such as Economy, Winter, and Tow-Haul mode. This is known as the ASM (auto-shifting manual) system in the Australian market.

Both Fusion and Ford Fiesta MK6 models feature a 5-speed Durashift EST in a 1.4L Otto (petrol fuel engine) and 1.4 TDCi (diesel fuel engine), automatic powertrain.

== Durashift CVT ==
There was a CVT version for smaller cars like some rare versions of Ford Focus.

== Durashift Manual ==
The Durashift name has been applied to the current Ford Transit manual only lineup, suggesting that the brand name has a broader meaning.

== Failure ==
When a Durashift transmission fails, the transmission often will not go back in neutral and the car will not start, causing extra problems for car owners and mechanics. Repairs of Durashift transmissions tend to cost lots of time and therefore money. It takes specialized knowledge of both computer and mechanical parts to repair a Durashift transmission, which is why repair is often perceived as complicated.

== See also ==
- List of Ford transmissions
