= Ford DLD engine =

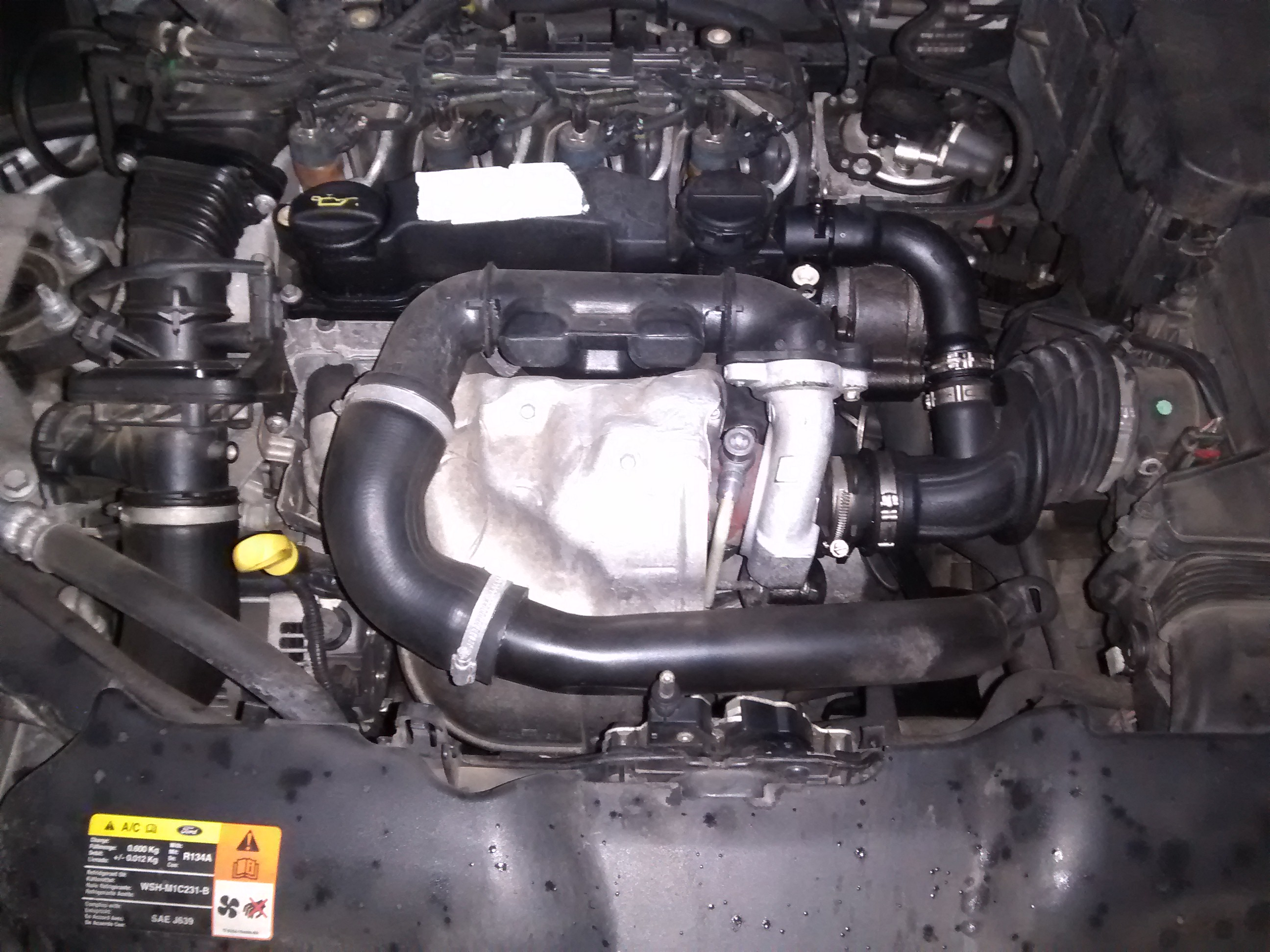

Overview
- Manufacturer: Ford of Britain & PSA Group
- Also called: DuraTorq TDCi
- Production: 1998-

Layout
- Configuration: Straight-4
- Displacement: 1.4 L (1398 cc); 1.5 L (1499 cc); 1.6 L (1560 cc); 1.8 L (1753 cc)
- Valvetrain: SOHC 2 valves x cyl. DOHC 4 valves x cyl.

Combustion
- Turbocharger: BorgWarner KP35 or Garrett GT1544V Variable-geometry with intercooler (some versions)
- Fuel system: Common rail Direct injection
- Management: Delphi Corp. DCR1400, Bosch EDC15C2 or EDC16C34, Siemens SID804 or SID802, Continental SIN 807
- Fuel type: Diesel
- Cooling system: Water-cooled

Output
- Power output: 55–125 PS (40–92 kW; 54–123 hp)
- Torque output: 130–320 N⋅m (96–236 lb⋅ft)

Emissions
- Emissions target standard: Euro 3 - Euro 6
- Emissions control systems: Diesel particulate filter (DPF)

The Ford DLD engine is an automobile engine family - a group of compact inline-four Diesel engines developed jointly by Ford of Britain and the automotive-diesel specialist PSA Group (Peugeot/Citroën). The Ford of Britain/PSA joint-venture for the production of the DLD/DV was announced in September 1998. Half of the total engine count are produced at Ford of Britain's main plant at Dagenham, England and at Ford's Chennai plant in India, the other half at PSA's Trémery plant in France.

The inline-four engines are sold under the DuraTorq TDCi name by Ford, and as the HDi by Citroën and Peugeot. Mazda also uses the Ford-made DLD engine in the Mazda2 and the Mazda 3, calling it the MZ-CD or CiTD.

Officially, there are two families of engines in the range:

- The 1.4 L DLD-414 is generally non-intercooled
- The 1.5 L derived from the 1.6 L
- The 1.6 L DLD-416 is always intercooled

Ford later added their unrelated 1.8 L DLD-418 engine to the DLD family, though it is properly part of the Ford Endura-D engine family.

In 2012, Ford added the 1.5-litre, closely derived from the 1.6-litre engine.

== DLD-414 ==
The Duratorq DLD-414 (or DV4) is a 1.4 L (1398 cc) straight-4 turbo-diesel. Output is 68 PS (50 kW; 67 hp) at 4500 rpm and 160 N⋅m (118 lb⋅ft) at 2000 rpm.

The DV4 is available in two versions:

- One, a SOHC 8-valve design, uses a KKK KP35 turbocharger but no intercooler. This is the same turbocharger as the Renault K9K Diesel. It is Euro 3 compliant, but will receive a Diesel particulate filter from 2006 to make it Euro 4 compliant. In Ford, Mazda, and most PSA applications it uses a Siemens SID804 or SID802 common rail injection system. The PSA Variant in the 2005-2008 Citroën C1/Peugeot 107/Toyota Aygo 1.4 HDi uses the Siemens SID805 common rail injection system with a lower power output compared to other applications to compensate for the weaker 5-speed manual transmission used in these models. In some PSA applications a Bosch common rail system is used.
- A second version uses a DOHC 16-valve design, with an intercooled variable-geometry turbocharger. This engine uses Delphi Corp.'s DCR1400 common-rail injection system. This derivation will no longer be built from 2006, as it will not be able to comply with the EURO4 regulations.
Applications:
- 8-valve non-intercooled, 55 PS (40 kW; 54 hp) and 130 N⋅m (96 lb⋅ft)
  - 2005–2008 Citroën C1/Peugeot 107/Toyota Aygo 1.4 HDi
- 8-valve non-intercooled, 68 PS (50 kW; 67 hp) and 150 N⋅m (111 lb⋅ft)
  - 2003–2009 Citroën C2 1.4 HDi
- 8-valve non-intercooled, 68 PS (50 kW; 67 hp) and 160 N⋅m (118 lb⋅ft)
  - 2002–2016 Citroën C3 1.4 HDi
  - 2002–2008 Ford Fiesta 1.4 TDCi
  - 2002–2008 Ford Fusion (Europe) 1.4 TDCi
  - 2002–2009 Peugeot 206 1.4 HDi
  - 2005–2009 Peugeot 1007 1.4 HDi
  - 2004 Citroen Xsara 1.4 HDI
  - 2002–2007 Mazda 2/Demio 1.4D
  - 2008–present Mazda 2/Demio 1.4D
  - 2007–present Ford Figo 1.4 TDCi Fiesta, also marketed as the Ikon in South Africa.
  - 2008–present Ford Bantam TDCi commercial vehicle in South Africa.
- 16-valve intercooled, 90 PS (66 kW; 89 hp) and 200 N⋅m (148 lb⋅ft)
  - 2001–2005 Citroën C3 1.4 HDi 16V
  - 2002–2005 Suzuki Liana 1.4 DDiS

Model	Output	Notes
DV4 TD	70 PS (51 kW; 69 hp)	Turbo-Diesel 8-valve
DV4 TED4	92 PS (68 kW; 91 hp)	Turbo-Diesel 16-valve

== DLD-415 ==
The Duratorq DLD-415 (or DV5) is a 1.5 L (1499 cc) straight-4 turbo-diesel. Output is 75 PS (55 kW; 74 hp) to 130 PS (96 kW; 128 hp) at 3500 rpm to 3750 rpm and 230 N⋅m (170 lb⋅ft) to 300 N⋅m (221 lb⋅ft) at 1750 rpm.

The DV5 has a DOHC 16-valve design, with an intercooled variable-geometry turbocharger (for example, Garrett GT1544V), and with Diesel particulate filter is Euro 6.2 compliant.

Applications:
- 16-valve intercooled, 75 PS (55 kW; 74 hp) and 230 N⋅m (170 lb⋅ft)
  - 2018– Peugeot Rifter/Partner 1.5 BlueHDi 75CV
  - 2018– Citroën Berlingo III 1.5 BlueHDi 75CV
  - 2018– Opel Combo E 1.5 Diesel 75cv
- 16-valve intercooled, 102 PS (75 kW; 101 hp) and 250 N⋅m (184 lb⋅ft)
  - 2018– Peugeot 2008 1.5 BlueHDi 100CV
  - 2019– Opel Zafira Life / Vivaro C 1.5 Diesel
  - 2018– Peugeot Traveller/Citroën Spacetourer 1.5 BlueHDi 100CV
  - 2018– Toyota ProAce 1.5 D4-D
  - 2018– Peugeot Rifter/Partner 1.5 BlueHDi 100CV
  - 2018–2022 Citroën C-Elysée 1.5 BlueHDi
  - 2018–2021 Peugeot 301 1.5 BlueHDi
  - 2018– Citroën C4 Cactus 1.5 BlueHDi 100
  - 2018– Citroën Berlingo III 1.5 BlueHDi 100CV
  - 2018– DS 3 Crossback 1.5 BlueHDi 100
  - 2018– Opel Combo E 1.5 Diesel 102CV
  - 2019– Opel Corsa F 1.5 Diesel 102CV
- 16-valve intercooled, 120 PS (88 kW; 118 hp) and 300 N⋅m (221 lb⋅ft)
  - 2018– Peugeot 2008 1.5 BlueHDi 120CV
  - 2019– Opel Zafira Life / Vivaro C 1.5 Diesel
  - 2018– Peugeot Traveller / Citroën Spacetourer 1.5 BlueHDi 120CV
  - 2018– Citroën C4 Cactus 1.5 BlueHDi 120
  - 2018– Toyota ProAce 1.5 BlueHDi 120CV
- 16-valve intercooled, 130 PS (96 kW; 128 hp) and 300 N⋅m (221 lb⋅ft)
  - 2017– Peugeot 308 II 1.5 BlueHDi
  - 2018– Peugeot 508 II 1.5 BlueHDi
  - 2018– Peugeot Rifter/Partner 1.5 BlueHDi 130CV
  - 2018– Citroën Berlingo III 1.5 BlueHDi 130CV
  - 2018– DS 3 Crossback 1.5 BlueHDi 130
  - 2018– Opel Combo E 1.5 Diesel 130cv
  - 2017– Peugeot 3008 II 1.5 BlueHDi
  - 2017– Peugeot 5008 II 1.5 BlueHDi
  - 2018– Citroën C4 Spacetourer 1.5 BlueHDi
  - 2018– Citroën C5 Aircross 1.5 BlueHDi
  - 2017– DS 7 Crossback 1.5 BlueHDi
  - 2018– Opel Grandland X 1.5 Turbo D

Model	Output	Notes
DV5 RE	75 PS (55 kW; 74 hp)	Turbo-Diesel 16-valve
DV5 RD	102 PS (75 kW; 101 hp)	Turbo-Diesel 16-valve
DV5	120 PS (88 kW; 118 hp)	Turbo-Diesel 16-valve
DV5RC	130 PS (96 kW; 128 hp)	Turbo-Diesel 16-valve

== DLD-416 ==
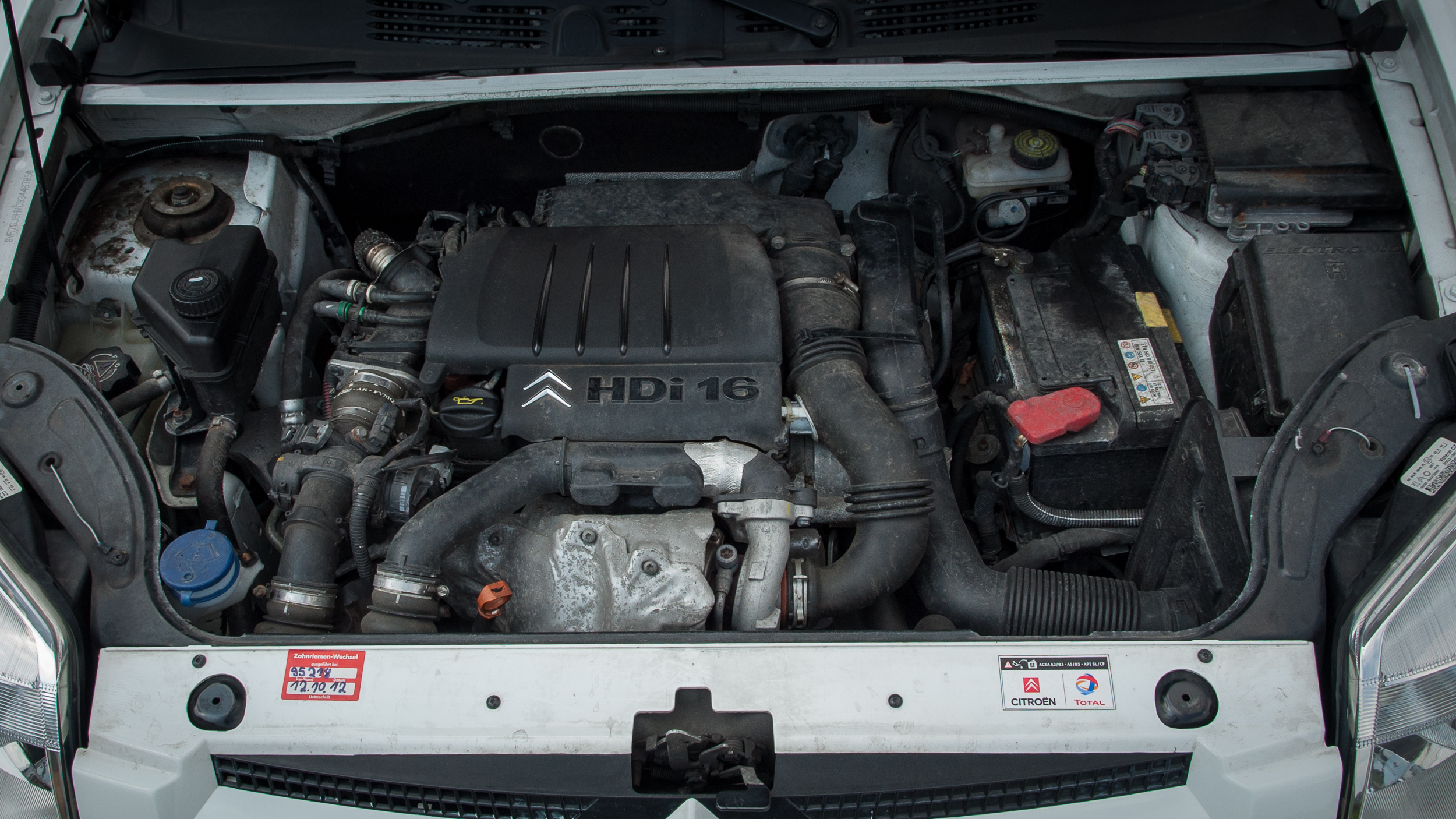
PSA DV6B engine in a Citroën Berlingo

The DLD-416 (or DV6) is a 1.6 L (1560 cc) UK-built version used by Ford, Volvo, PSA, Mini and Mazda.

The DV6 has a DOHC 16-valve design, with an intercooled variable-geometry turbocharger (for example, Garrett GT1544V), and with Diesel particulate filter is Euro 5 compliant. In 2011 the 16V DOHC was reduced to 8V and only SOHC and called DV-6C/DV-6D

Applications include:

Years	Model	Power output	Torque
2007–2008	Suzuki SX4 1.6 DDiS	90 PS (66 kW; 89 hp)	215 N⋅m (159 lb⋅ft)
2007–2009	MINI Cooper D 1.6	110 PS (81 kW; 108 hp)	240 N⋅m (177 lb⋅ft)
2007–present	Citroën C4 Picasso 1.6 HDi	110 PS (81 kW; 108 hp)	240 N⋅m (177 lb⋅ft)
2010–present	Citroën C3 Picasso 1.6 HDi	110 PS (81 kW; 108 hp)	240 N⋅m (177 lb⋅ft)
2006–present	Citroën Berlingo 1.6 HDi	75–90 PS (55–66 kW; 74–89 hp)	172–215 N⋅m (127–159 lb⋅ft)
2008–2009	Citroën C2 1.6 HDi	110 PS (81 kW; 108 hp)	269 N⋅m (198 lb⋅ft)
2005–present	Citroën C3 1.6 HDi	90 PS (66 kW; 89 hp)	215 N⋅m (159 lb⋅ft)
2009–present	Citroën DS3 1.6 HDi	90 PS (66 kW; 89 hp)	230 N⋅m (170 lb⋅ft)
2009–present	Citroën DS3 1.6 HDi	110 PS (81 kW; 108 hp)	269 N⋅m (198 lb⋅ft)
2011–present	Citroën DS4 1.6 HDi	110 PS (81 kW; 108 hp)	269 N⋅m (198 lb⋅ft)
2004–present	Citroën C4 1.6 HDi	90–109 PS (66–80 kW; 89–108 hp)	215–240 N⋅m (159–177 lb⋅ft)
2004–present	Citroën C5 1.6 HDi	109 PS (80 kW; 108 hp)	240 N⋅m (177 lb⋅ft)
2004–2009	Citroën Xsara Picasso 1.6 HDi	109 PS (80 kW; 108 hp)	240 N⋅m (177 lb⋅ft)
2010–present	Ford C-Max/Grand C-Max 1.6 TDCi	115 PS (85 kW; 113 hp)	270 N⋅m (199 lb⋅ft)
2005–2010	Ford Fiesta 1.6 TDCi	90 PS (66 kW; 89 hp)	200 N⋅m (148 lb⋅ft)
2010–present	Ford Fiesta 1.6 TDCi	95 PS (70 kW; 94 hp)	212 N⋅m (156 lb⋅ft)
2005–2012	Ford Fusion (Europe) 1.6 TDCi	90 PS (66 kW; 89 hp)	215 N⋅m (159 lb⋅ft)
2004–present	Ford Focus 1.6 TDCi 90	90 PS (66 kW; 89 hp)	215 N⋅m (159 lb⋅ft)
2004–present	Ford Focus 1.6 TDCi 110	109 PS (80 kW; 108 hp)	240 N⋅m (177 lb⋅ft)
2004–2010	Ford Focus C-MAX 1.6 TDCi 90	90 PS (66 kW; 89 hp)	215 N⋅m (159 lb⋅ft)
2003–2010	Ford Focus C-MAX 1.6 TDCi 110	109 PS (80 kW; 108 hp)	240 N⋅m (177 lb⋅ft)
2008–present	Mazda2 MZ-CD 1.6	90 PS (66 kW; 89 hp)	212 N⋅m (156 lb⋅ft)
2003–present	Mazda3 MZ-CD 1.6	109 PS (80 kW; 108 hp)	240 N⋅m (177 lb⋅ft)
2003–2006	Peugeot 206 1.6 HDi	109 PS (80 kW; 108 hp)	240 N⋅m (177 lb⋅ft)
2006–2012	Peugeot 207 1.6 HDi	90–109 PS (66–80 kW; 89–108 hp)	215–240 N⋅m (159–177 lb⋅ft)
2019–present	Peugeot 208 (UB) 1.6 HDi (Morocco)	92 PS (68 kW; 91 hp)	230 N⋅m (170 lb⋅ft)
2005–2008	Peugeot 307 1.6 HDi	90–109 PS (66–80 kW; 89–108 hp)	215–240 N⋅m (159–177 lb⋅ft)
2008–present	Peugeot 308 1.6 HDi		
2008–2016	Peugeot 3008 1.6 HDi	110 PS (81 kW; 108 hp)	240 N⋅m (177 lb⋅ft)
2016–2017	Peugeot 3008 1.6 BlueHDi	120 PS (88 kW; 118 hp)	300 N⋅m (221 lb⋅ft)
2003–2010	Peugeot 407 1.6 HDi	109 PS (80 kW; 108 hp)	240 N⋅m (177 lb⋅ft)
2010–present	Peugeot 508 1.6 HDi	112 PS (82 kW; 110 hp)	240 N⋅m (177 lb⋅ft)
2007–2012	Volvo C30 D2 and DRIVe	115 PS (85 kW; 113 hp)	270 N⋅m (199 lb⋅ft)
2004–2012	Volvo S40 1.6D	109 PS (80 kW; 108 hp)	240 N⋅m (177 lb⋅ft)
2004–2012	Volvo V50 1.6D	109 PS (80 kW; 108 hp)	240 N⋅m (177 lb⋅ft)
2010–2013	Volvo S60/V60 1.6D	115 PS (85 kW; 113 hp)	240 N⋅m (177 lb⋅ft)
2007–2013	Volvo V70 1.6D	115 PS (85 kW; 113 hp)	240 N⋅m (177 lb⋅ft)
2009–2013	Volvo S80 1.6D DRIVe	109 PS (80 kW; 108 hp)	240 N⋅m (177 lb⋅ft)
2012–2014	Volvo V40 (2012–2019) D2 and DRIVe	115 PS (85 kW; 113 hp)	270 N⋅m (199 lb⋅ft)

Model	Output	Notes
DV6 ATED4	90 PS (66 kW; 89 hp)	Turbo-Diesel 16-valve
DV6 B	75 PS (55 kW; 74 hp)	Turbo-Diesel 16-valve
DV6 TED4	110 PS (81 kW; 108 hp)	Turbo-Diesel 16-valve
DV6 C	112 PS (82 kW; 110 hp)	Turbo-Diesel 8-valve
DV6 D	92 PS (68 kW; 91 hp)	Turbo-Diesel 8-valve
DV6 FE	75 PS (55 kW; 74 hp)	Turbo-Diesel 8-valve
DV6 FD	95 PS (70 kW; 94 hp)	Turbo-Diesel 8-valve
DV6 FC	120 PS (88 kW; 118 hp)	Turbo-Diesel 8-valve

== DLD-418 ==
The Duratorq DLD-418 is a 1.8 L (1753 cc) intercooled common rail diesel engine. It is only a DLD by name, since it is completely unrelated to the 1.4/1.6 units, and is derived from Ford's own 1.8 8v Endura-D engine that saw service through the 1980s and 1990s. However, Ford considers it part of the DLD family, as evidenced by the official "DLD" name.

The Endura-D was heavily revised and updated with a variable-vane turbocharger and a Delphi high-pressure common rail injection system and relaunched in 2001 as the DuraTorq TDCi, with the original engine being rebadged 'DuraTorq TDDi'.

The output of the original 2001 unit is 115 PS (85 kW; 113 hp) at 3800 rpm and 250 N⋅m (184 lb⋅ft) at 1850 rpm. In August 2002, a version appeared in the Ford Focus with reduced power, producing 99 PS (73 kW; 98 hp) at 3850 rpm and 240 N⋅m (177 lb⋅ft) at 1750 rpm. Early 2005 saw the more powerful unit's torque boosted to 280 N⋅m (207 lb⋅ft) at 1900 rpm, with power remaining unchanged at 115 PS (85 kW; 113 hp).

The latest versions of the DLD-418 were released with the 2007 Ford Mondeo. One has an output of 99 PS (73 kW; 98 hp) at 3850 rpm and 280 N⋅m (207 lb⋅ft) at 1800 rpm. The more powerful variant has an output of 125 PS (92 kW; 123 hp) at 3700 rpm and 320 N⋅m (236 lb⋅ft) at 1800 rpm. This variant was the first production car engine featuring a "wet belt", with its timing belt in an oil bath for theoretically improved efficiency. Wet belts are better known for their later use in PSA's PureTech and Ford's own EcoBoost engines.

Applications:
- 115 PS (85 kW; 113 hp) and 250 N⋅m (184 lb⋅ft):
  - 2001–2004 Ford Focus 1.8 TDCi 115PS
- 100 PS (74 kW; 99 hp) and 220 N⋅m (162 lb⋅ft):
  - 2002–2004 Ford Focus 1.8 TDCi 100PS
- 115 PS (85 kW; 113 hp) and 280 N⋅m (207 lb⋅ft):
  - 2005–2011 Ford Focus 1.8 TDCi 115PS
  - 2005–2010 Ford Focus C-MAX 1.8 TDCi 115PS
- 100 PS (74 kW; 99 hp) and 280 N⋅m (207 lb⋅ft):
  - 2006–2012 Ford Galaxy 1.8 TDCi 100PS
  - 2007–2012 Ford Mondeo 1.8 TDCi 100PS
- 125 PS (92 kW; 123 hp) and 320 N⋅m (236 lb⋅ft):
  - 2006–2012 Ford Galaxy 1.8 TDCi 125PS
  - 2006–2012 Ford S-Max 1.8 TDCi 125PS
  - 2007–2012 Ford Mondeo 1.8 TDCi 125PS

See also:

== See also ==
- Ford Duratorq engine
- List of Ford engines
- PSA HDi engine
- List of PSA engines
