= Variable camshaft timing =

Automobile variable valve timing technology

Right-hand side VCT oil control solenoid and harness from a Ford 4.6L SOHC 3V V8 engine

Variable camshaft timing (VCT) is an automobile variable valve timing technology developed by Ford. It allows for improved engine performance, reduced emissions, and increased fuel efficiency compared to engines with fixed camshafts. It uses electronically controlled hydraulic valves that direct high pressure engine oil into the camshaft phaser cavity. These oil control solenoids are bolted into the cylinder heads towards the front of the engine near the camshaft phasers. The powertrain control module (PCM) transmits a signal to the solenoids to move a valve spool that regulates the flow of oil to the phaser cavity. The phaser cavity changes the valve timing by rotating the camshaft slightly from its initial orientation, which results in the camshaft timing being advanced. The PCM adjusts the camshaft timing depending on factors such as engine load and rpm.

== History ==
For twin-cam or DOHC engines, VCT was used on either the intake or exhaust camshaft. (Engines that have VCT on both camshafts are now designated as Ti-VCT.↓) The use of variable camshaft timing on the exhaust camshaft is for improved emissions, and vehicles with VCT on the exhaust camshaft do not require exhaust gas recirculation (EGR) as retarding the exhaust cam timing achieves the same result. VCT on the intake camshaft is used primarily for increasing engine power and torque as the PCM is able to optimize the opening of the intake valves to match the engine conditions.

VCT is used in Ford's Triton 5.4L 3-valve V8 engine, the Australian Barra 182 and 240 Inline-6s, and Ford's 4.6L 3-valve V8 engine used in the 2006–2010 Ford Explorer and 2005–2010 Ford Mustang GT.

The 2.0L Zetec inline-4 used in the 1998–2003 Ford Escort ZX2, Ford Contour, and 1999–2002 Mercury Cougar used VCT on the exhaust camshaft. The 2002–2004 SVT Focus (ST170 in Europe) also featured VCT, but on the intake camshaft of its modified version of the 2.0L Zetec engine. In addition, the 1.7L Zetec-S engine found in the European Ford Puma was equipped with variable camshaft timing. The 6.2L V8 introduced in the 2010 SVT Raptor also uses VCT. That motor has a single cam per bank, so it is dual-equal variable cam timing.

== Ti-VCT ==
Twin independent variable camshaft timing (Ti-VCT) is the name given by Ford to engines with the ability to advance or retard the timing of both the intake and exhaust camshafts independently, unlike the original versions of VCT, which only operated on a single camshaft. This allows for improved power and torque, particularly at lower engine RPM, as well as improved fuel economy and reduced emissions. Some Ford Ti-VCT engines use BorgWarner's cam torque actuation (CTA) which utilizes the "existing torsional energy in the valve train to rotate the camshaft" instead of traditional oil pressure driven cam phasing.

Many new Ford engines feature Ti-VCT, including ones used in the 2011-2012 Mustangs, 2011 Edge and Edge Sport, 2011 Lincoln MKX, 2011 Fiesta, 2011 Explorer, 2011-2016 F-150, and 2012 Focus.

Engines using CTA system:

- 5.0 Coyote

Engines without CTA:

- 3.7 Cyclone

== See also ==
- Variable valve timing
- Exhaust gas recirculation
