= CV-7 =

CV7 may refer to:

- USS Wasp (CV-7), an aircraft carrier operated by the United States Navy from 1940 until 1942, when it was sunk by Japanese submarine I-19 en route to Guadalcanal
- de Havilland Canada DHC-5 Buffalo, a specialized cargo aircraft with short takeoff and landing (STOL) capability
- Landwind CV7, a subcompact sedan
