= Mazda 121 =

The Mazda 121 name has been used on a variety of Mazda automobiles for various export markets from 1975 until 2002:

- 1975–1981 — Piston engined variants of the second generation Mazda Cosmo sports car
- 1986–1991 — First generation Ford Festiva; subcompact car
- 1991–1998 — Autozam Revue; subcompact four-door sedan
- 1996–2002 — First generation Mazda Demio; subcompact car (in countries where the Fiesta-based "121" was not sold)
- 1996–2002 — Badge engineered version of the fourth-generation Ford Fiesta subcompact car, sold in some European markets
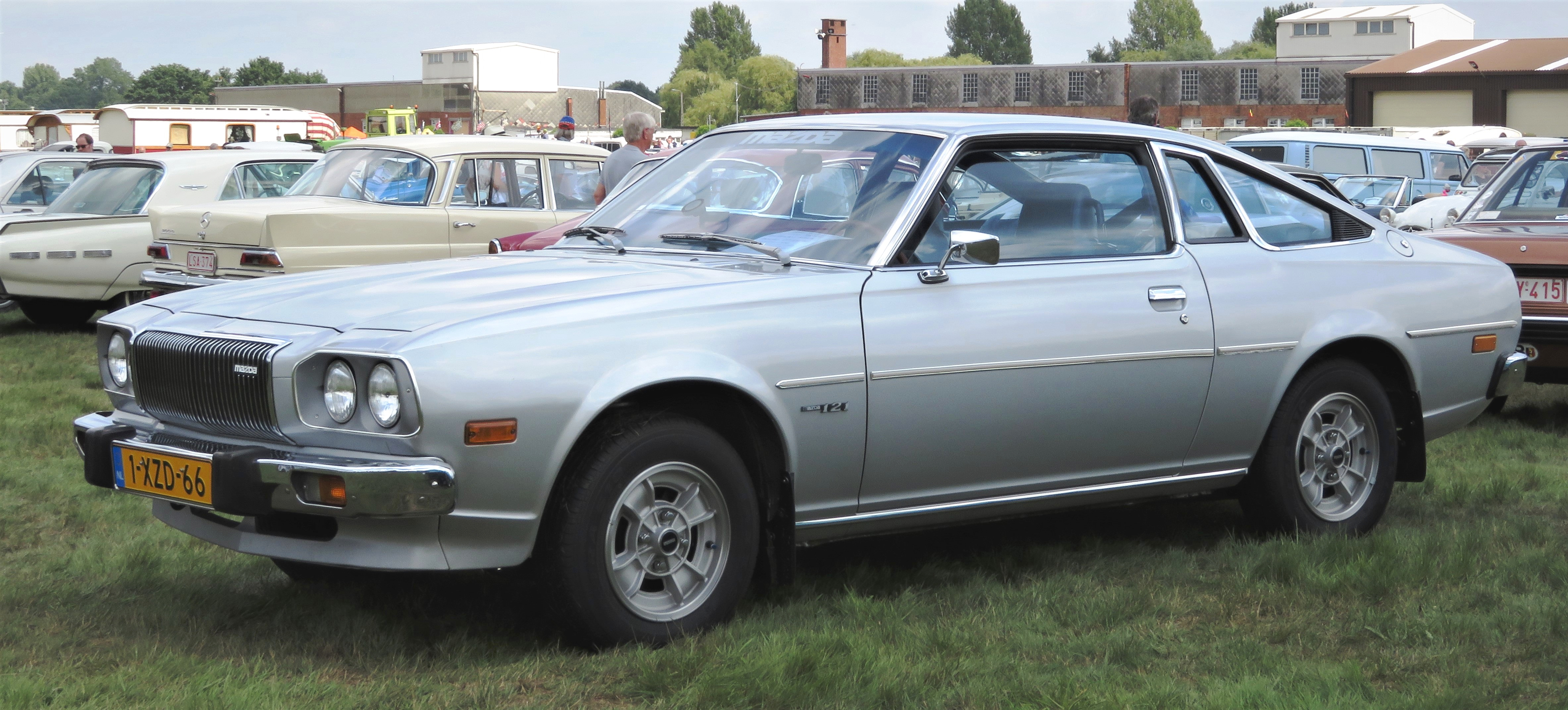
Mazda 121 (1975–1981)

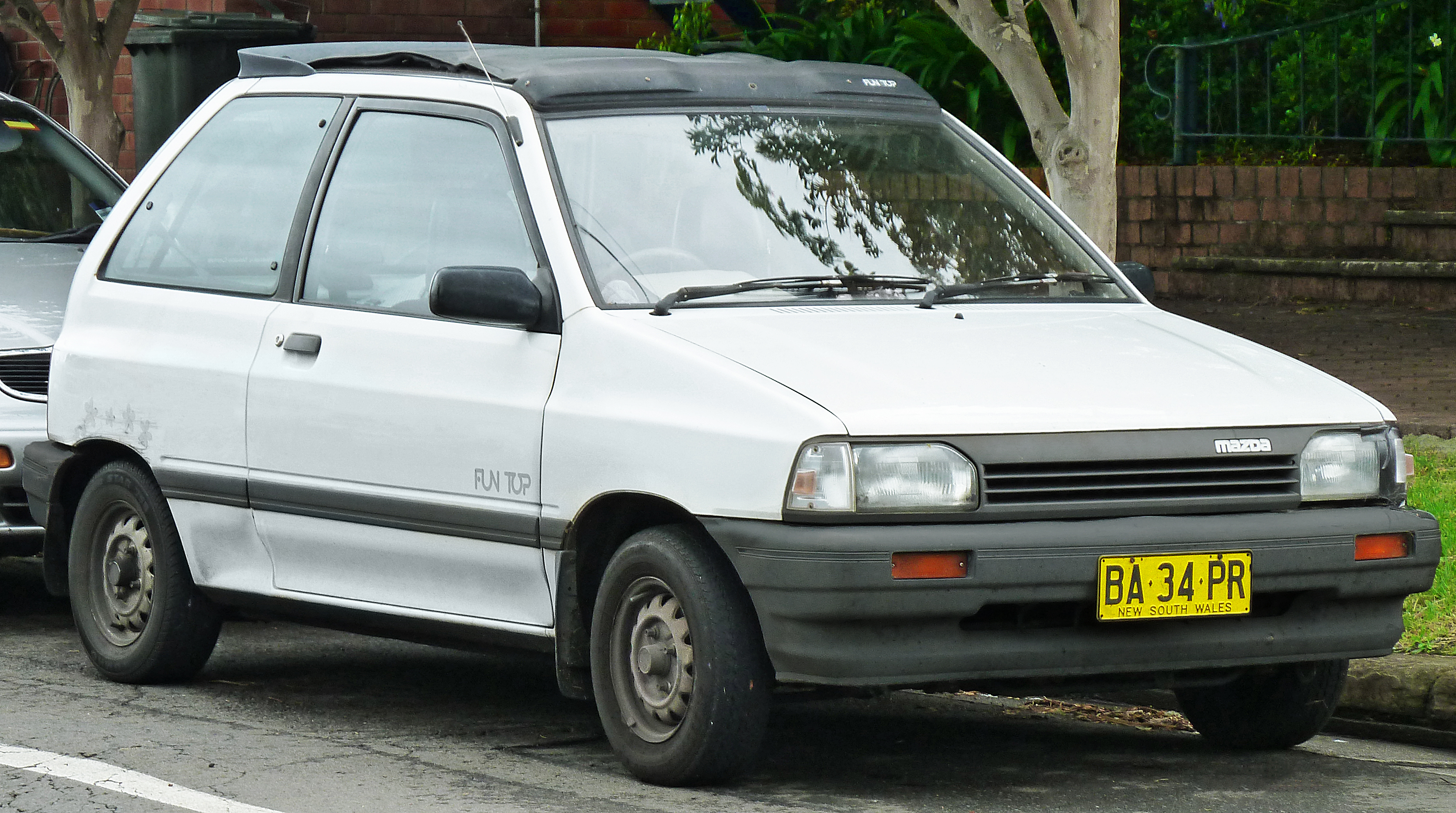
Mazda 121 (DA) (1986–1991)

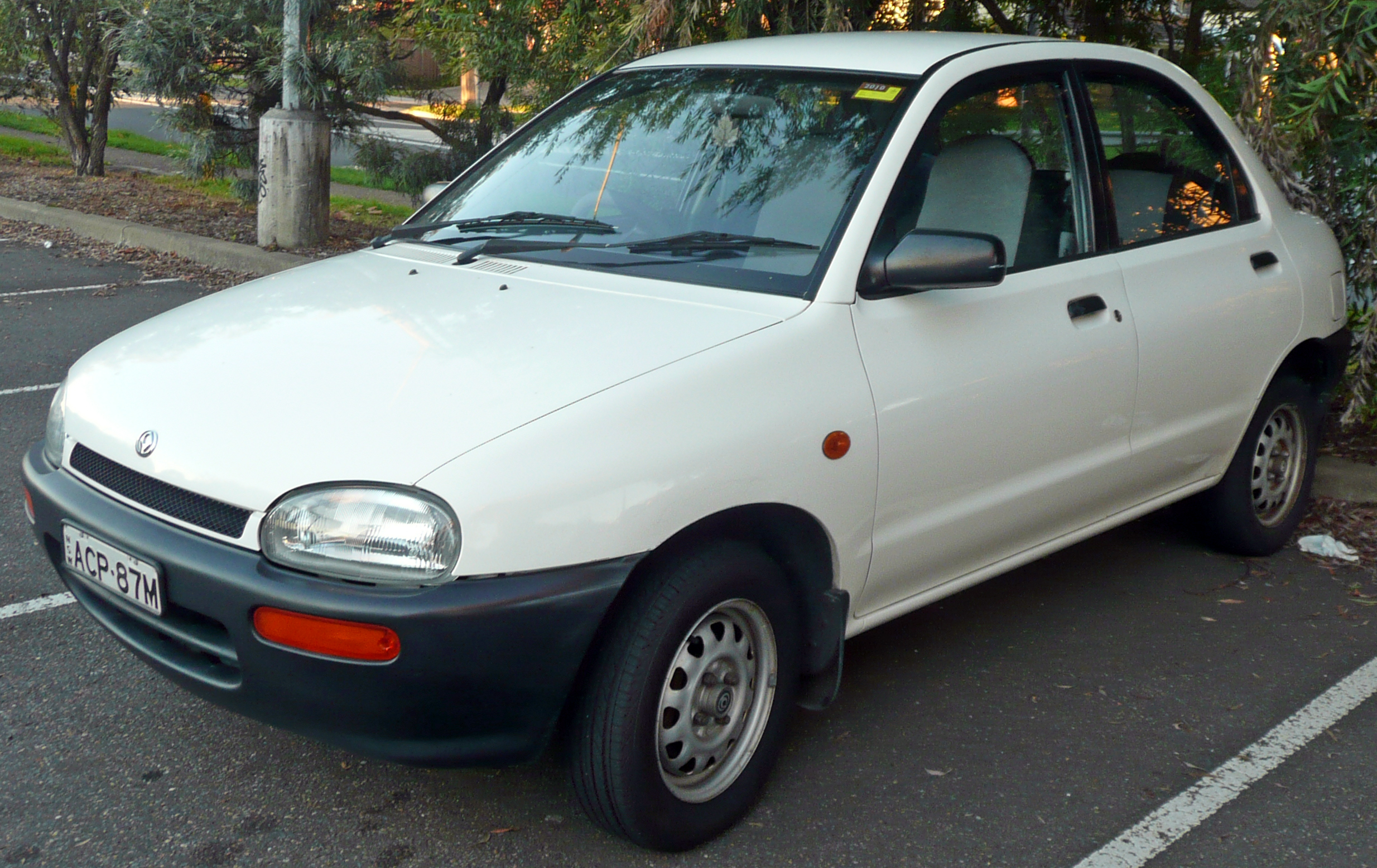
Mazda 121 (DB) (1991–1998)

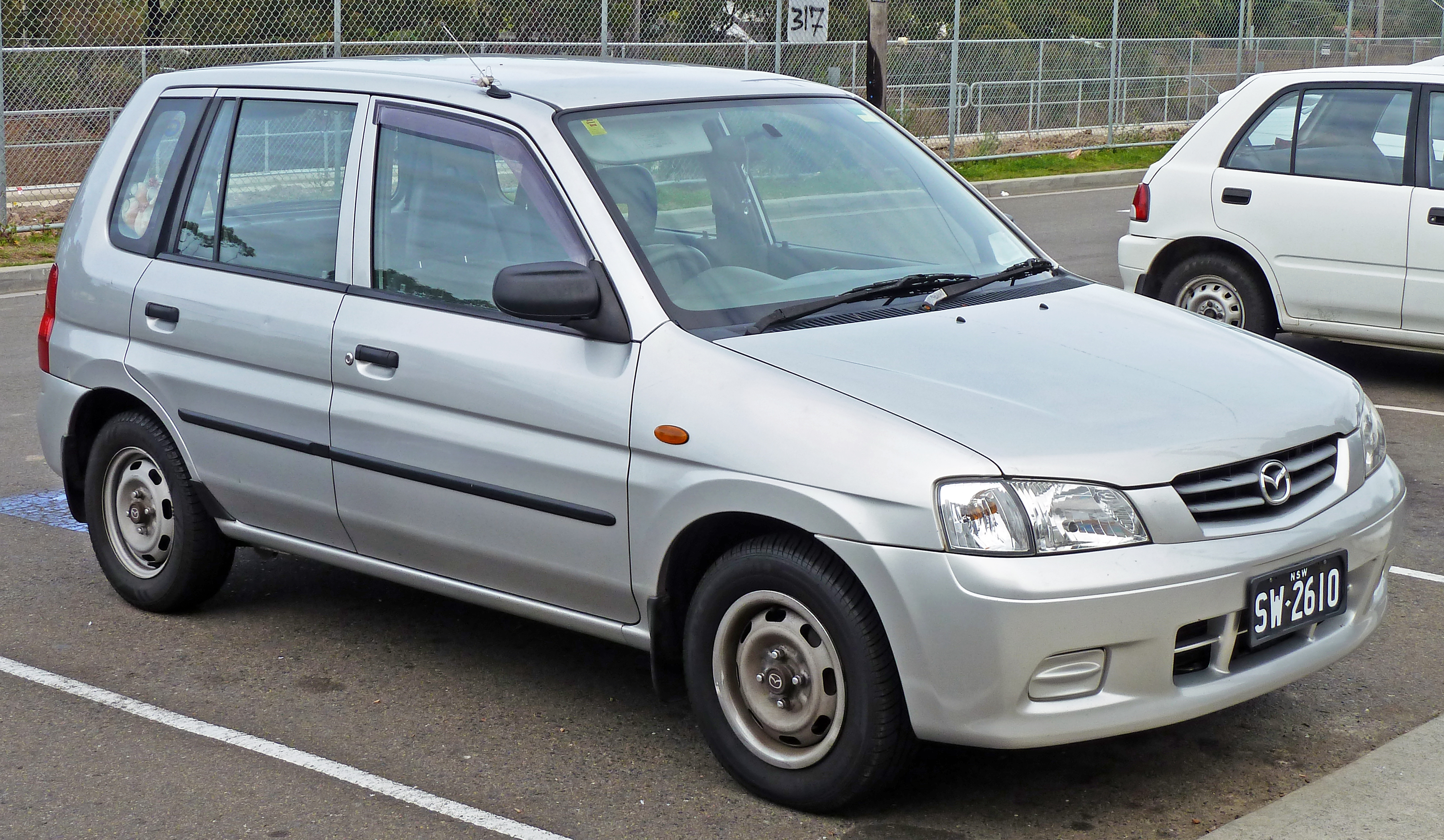
Mazda 121 (DW) (1996–2002)

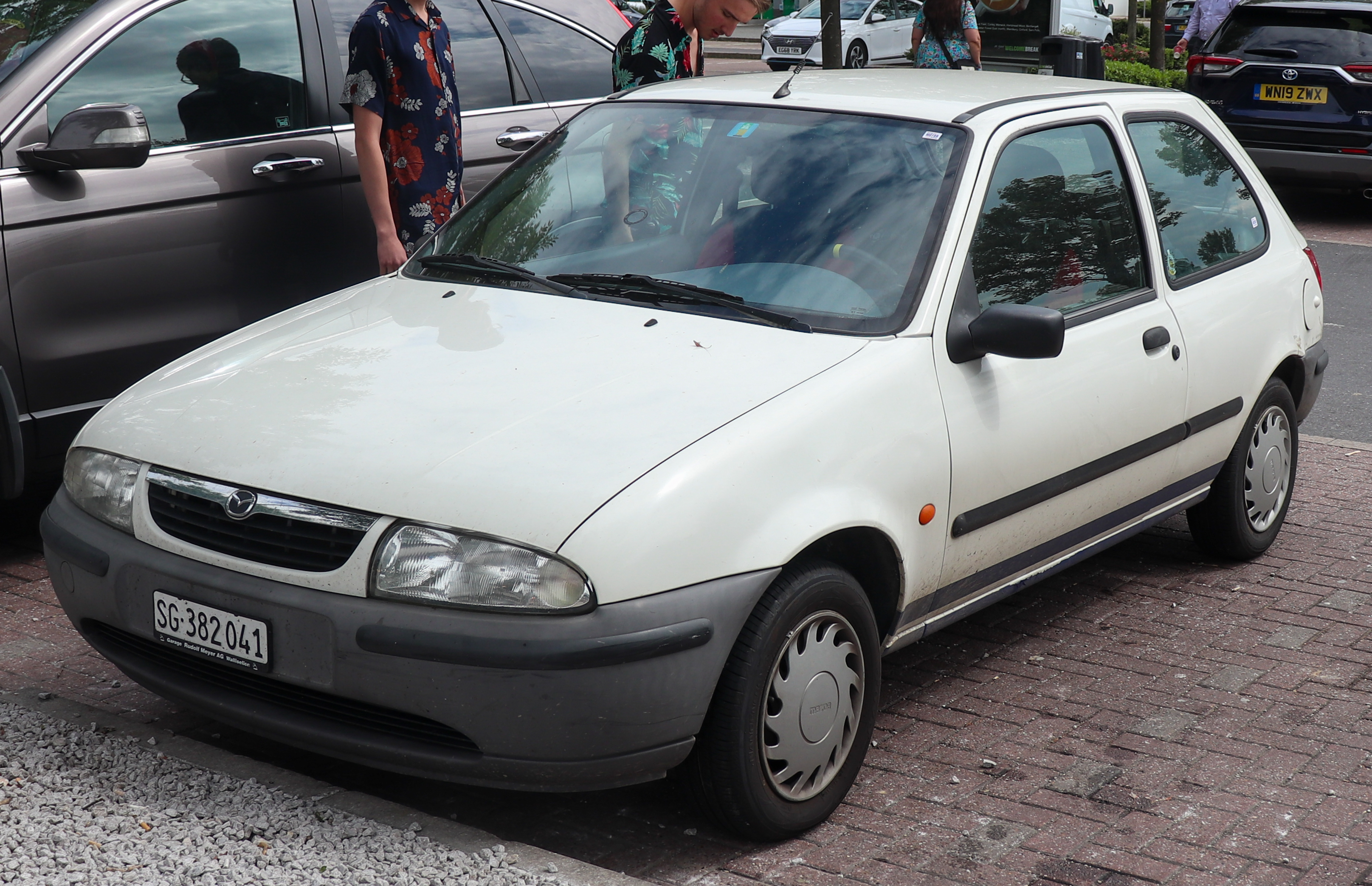
Mazda 121 (1996–2002)
