= Ford Fiesta (fourth generation) =

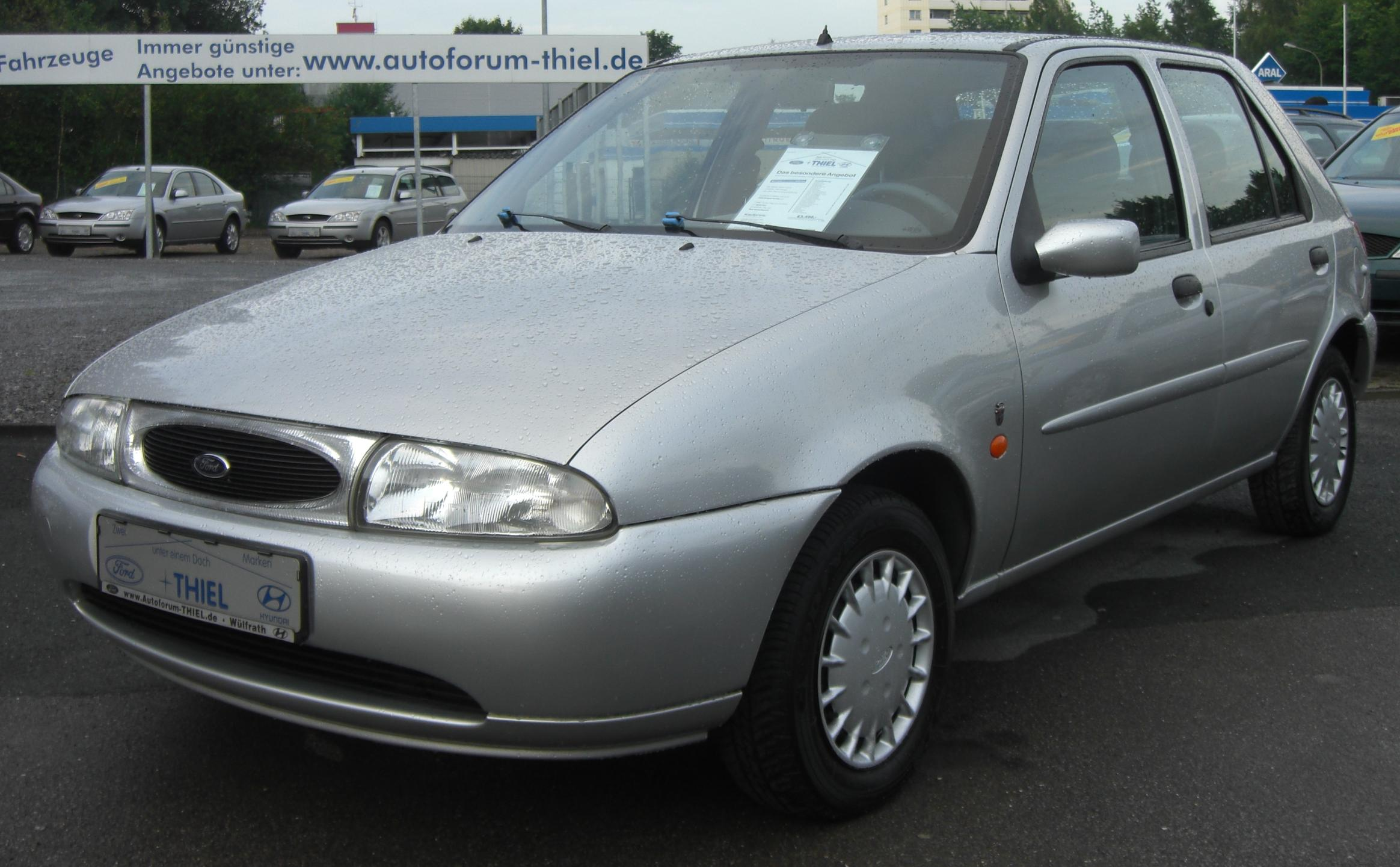
- Ford Fiesta 5-door hatchback (pre-facelift)

Overview
- Also called: Mazda 121 (hatchback; Europe); Mazda 121 Soho (hatchback; South Africa); Ford Fiesta Street (Brazil); Ford Ikon (sedan); Landwind CV7 (sedan; China); Changan CV7 (sedan; outside China)
- Production: October 1995 – December 2002 (Europe); 1996–2013 (Brazil); 1997–2011 (South Africa); 1999–2011 (India); 2003–2006 (China)
- Assembly: Spain: Almussafes (Ford Valencia); United Kingdom: Dagenham (Ford Dagenham); Germany: Cologne (CB&A); Germany: Saarlouis (SB&A); Brazil: São Bernardo do Campo (Ford Brazil); China: Chongqing (Changan Ford Mazda); China: Nanchang (Landwind); South Africa: Pretoria (FMCSA)

Body and chassis
- Body style: 3/5-door hatchback; 3-door panel van; 4-door sedan (also known as Ikon); 3-door high cube panel van (Courier); 2 door coupé utility (Courier/Bantam)
- Platform: Ford B platform
- Related: Ford Ka; Ford Puma; Ford Courier; Ford Bantam

Powertrain
- Engine: Petrol: 998 cc (60.9 cu in) Rocam I4; 999 cc (61.0 cu in) Endura-E I4; 1,242 cc (75.8 cu in) Zetec-SE I4; 1,299 cc (79.3 cu in) Endura-E I4; 1,301 cc (79.4 cu in) JL474Q I4; 1,388 cc (84.7 cu in) Zetec-SE I4; 1,392 cc (84.9 cu in) CVH I4; 1,497 cc (91.4 cu in) JL475Q I4; 1,596 cc (97.4 cu in) Zetec-SE I4; 1,596 cc (97.4 cu in) Rocam I4; Diesel: 1,753 cc (107.0 cu in) Endura-D I4; 1,753 cc (107.0 cu in) Endura-TDDi I4-TD
- Transmission: 5-speed IB5 manual; CVT automatic

Dimensions
- Wheelbase: 2,446 mm (96.3 in) (hatchback); 2,486 mm (97.9 in) (sedan); 2,492 mm (98.1 in) (sedan; China)
- Length: 3,828–3,833 mm (150.7–150.9 in) (hatchback); 4,140 mm (163 in) (sedan); 4,167–4,220 mm (164.1–166.1 in) (sedan; China)
- Width: 1,634 mm (64.3 in)
- Height: 1,334 mm (52.5 in); 1,634 mm (64.3 in) (sedan; China)
- Curb weight: 924–1,058 kg (2,037–2,332 lb) (hatchback); 1,004–1,040 kg (2,213–2,293 lb) (sedan)

Chronology
- Predecessor: Ford Fiesta (third generation); Mazda 121 (for Mazda)
- Successor: Ford Fiesta (fifth generation) Ford Ikon (Sedan); Mazda2 (for Mazda); Changan Alsvin (for Landwind/Changan CV7)

The Fiesta Mark IV (internal code name was BE91) was launched in October 1995 and became Britain's best-selling car from 1996 to 1998, when it was overtaken by the all-new Ford Focus, a replacement for the Ford Escort. The facelift Mark IV is sometimes referred to as the Fiesta Mark V.

== Design ==
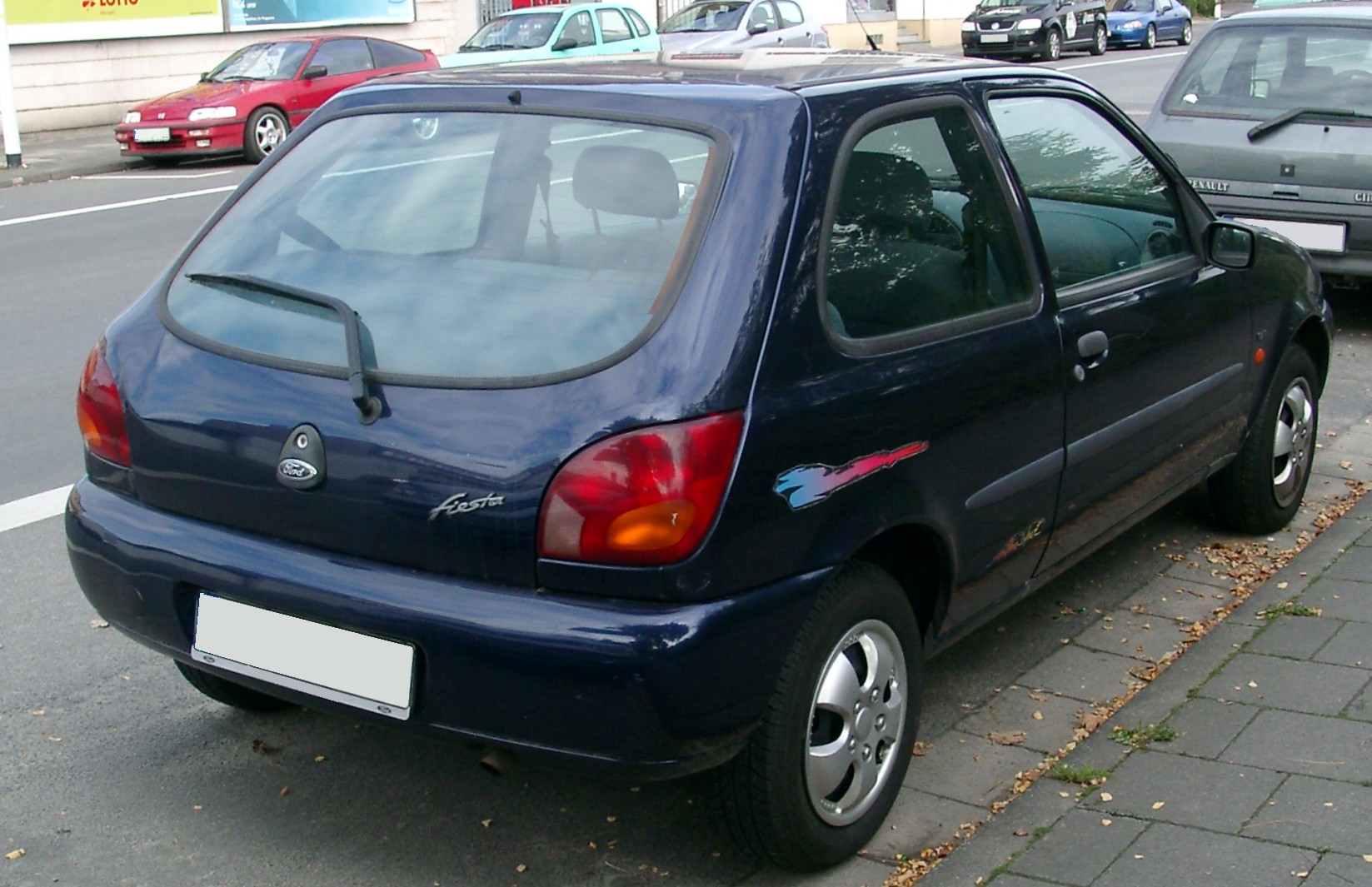
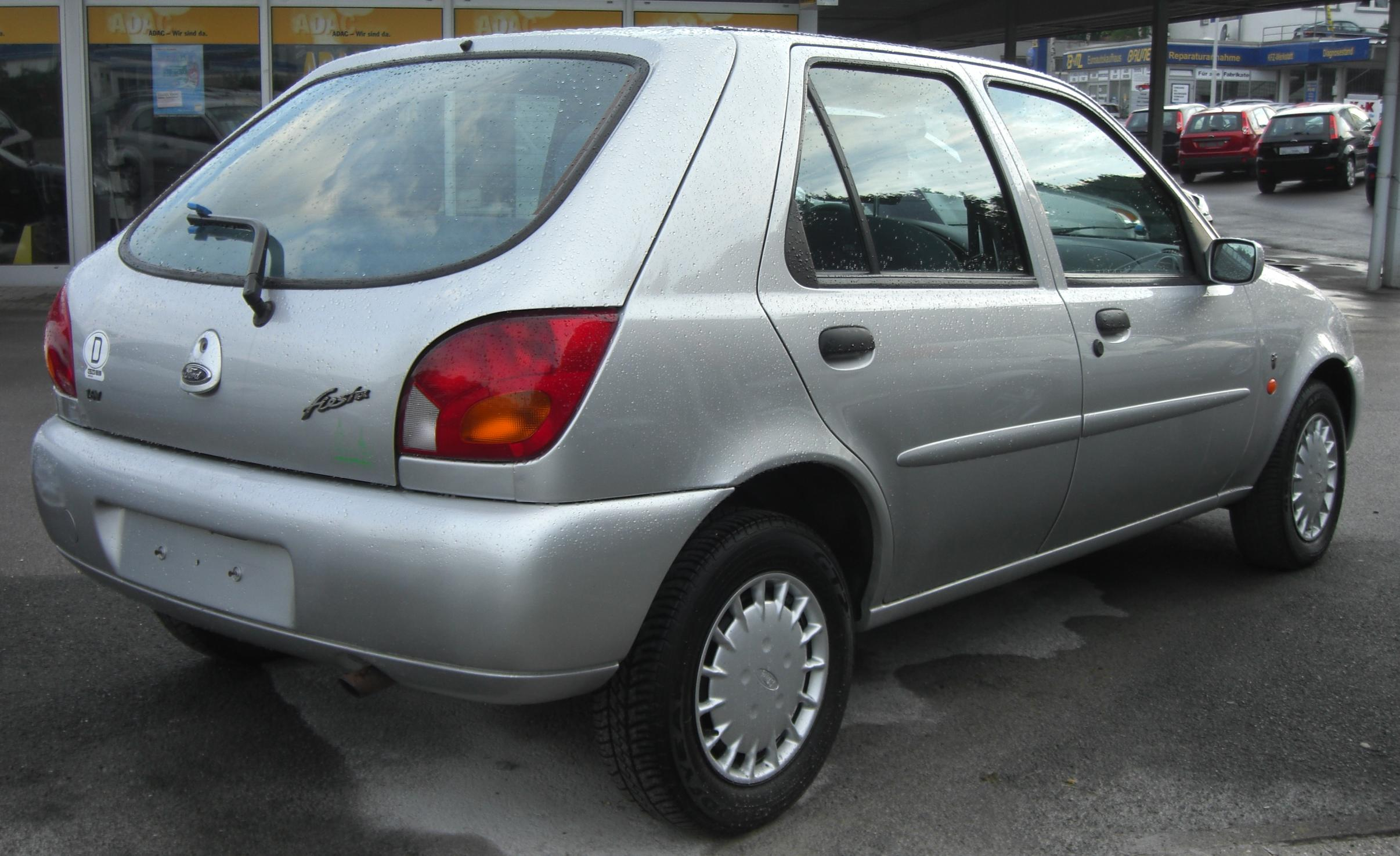

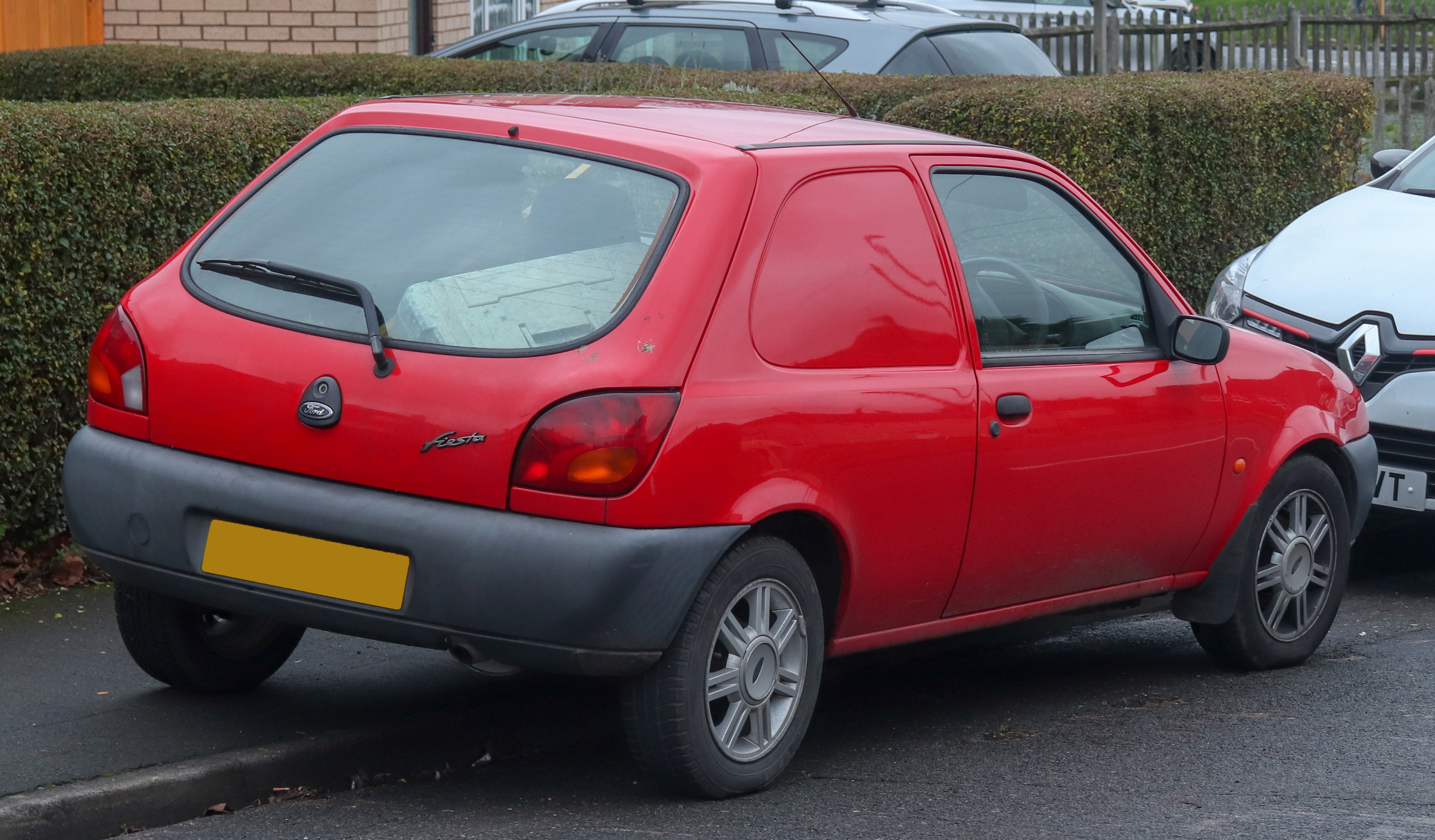
Pre-facelift models of 3/5-door hatchbacks and panel van

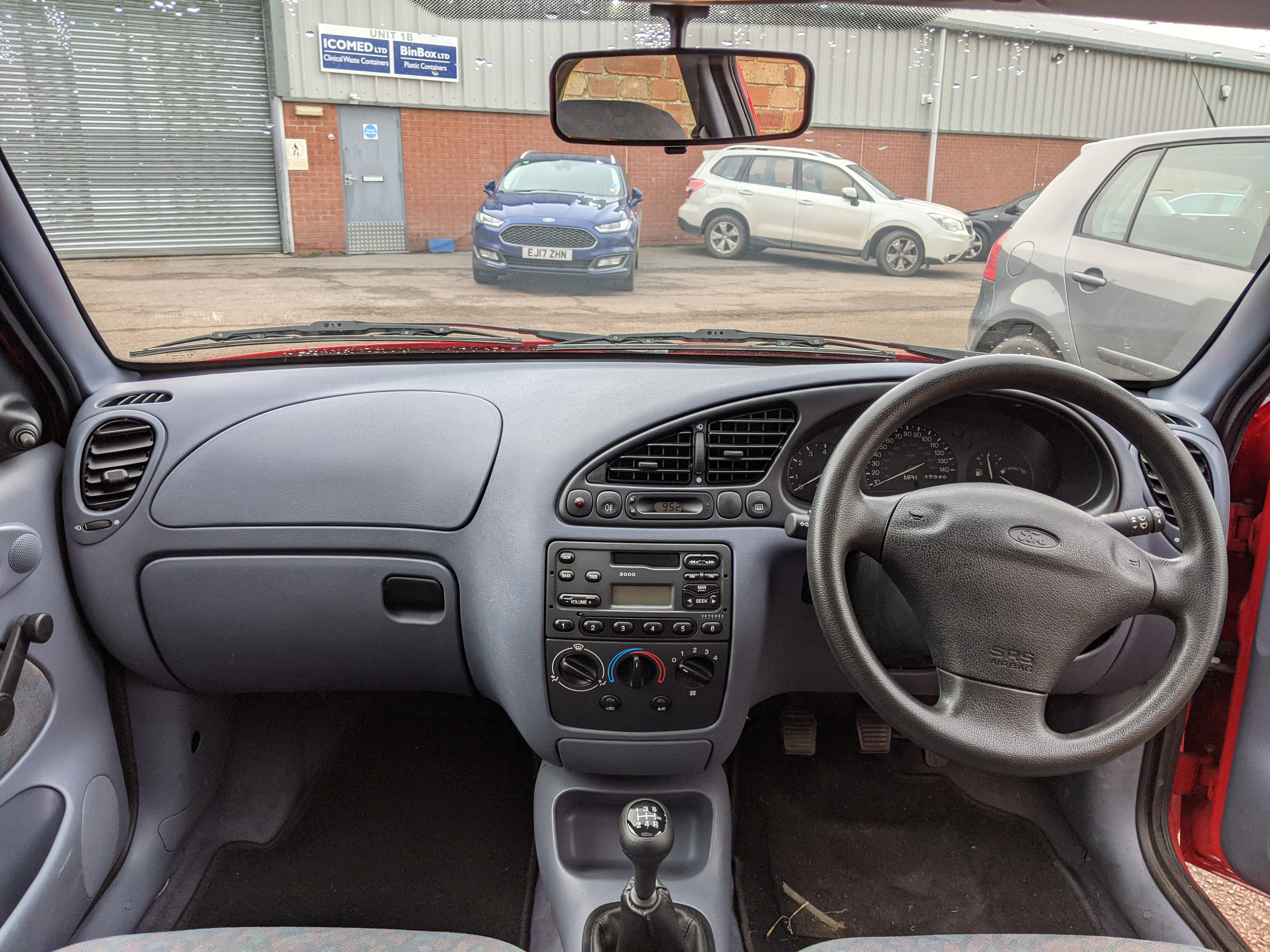

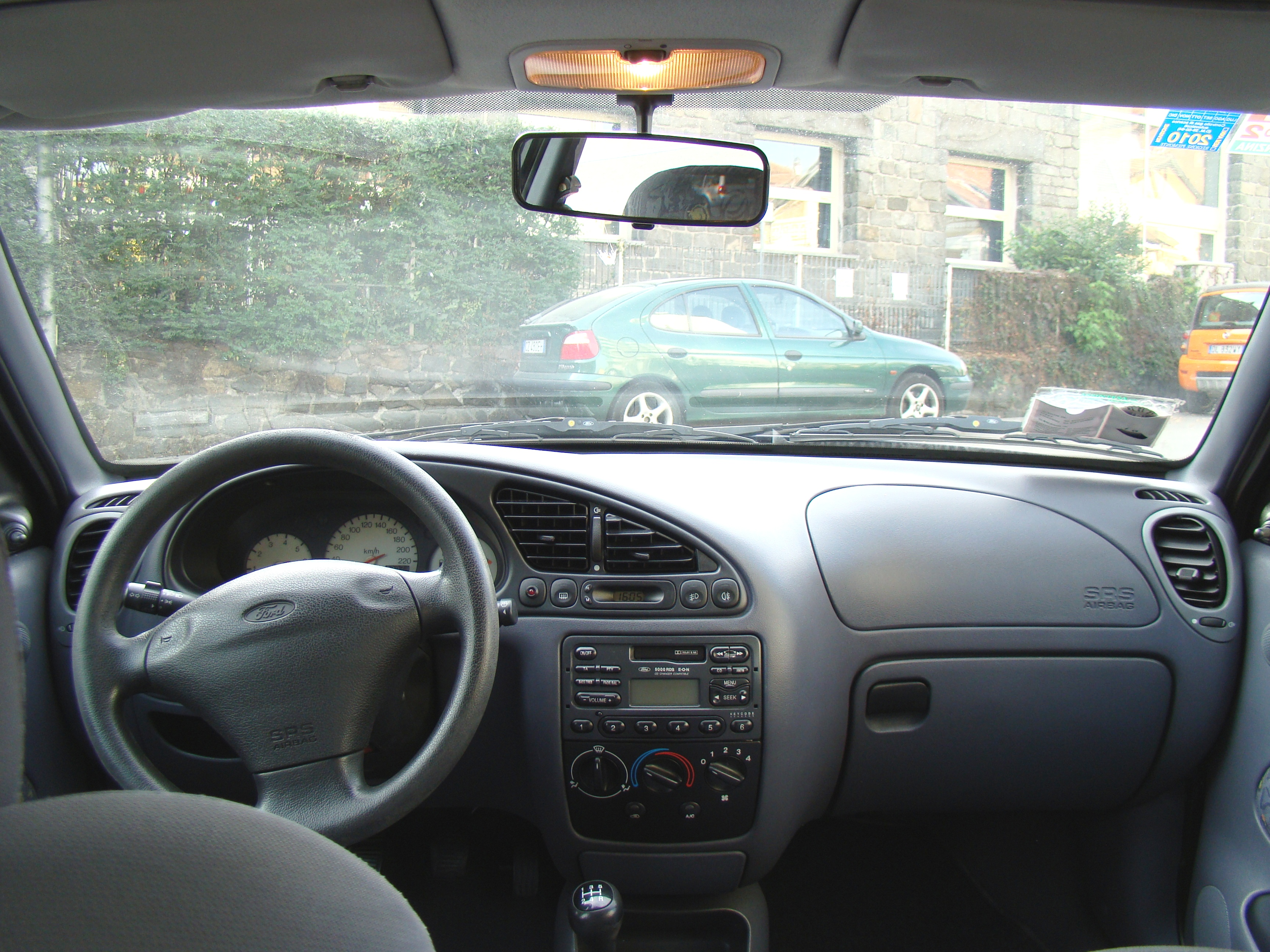
Interior (RHD and LHD)

The fourth generation Ford Fiesta, launched in the autumn of 1995, was based on the previous Fiesta, but was significantly restyled on the interior and exterior. It retained the body structure on the five-door versions, and a minor revision to the three-door version. The RS1800 and RS Turbo models were not carried over to the updated Fiesta range.

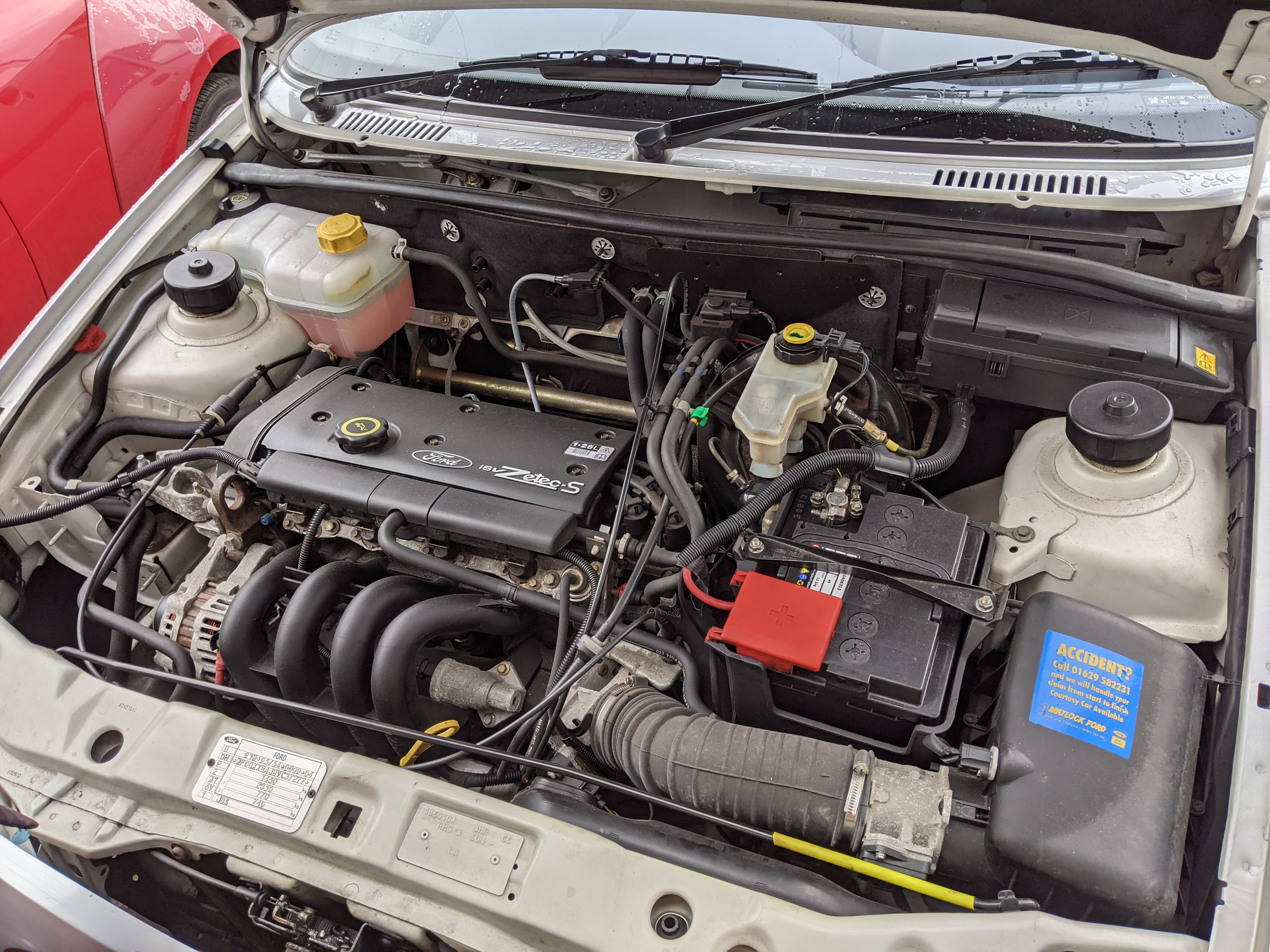
Ford Zetec S 1.25 L engine

The model featured a range of new Zetec-SE engines, available in 1.25 L and 1.4 L forms; the 1.8 litre diesel engine was slightly modified for the Mark IV, now marketed as the "Endura DE". Lower specification models used what would be the final development of the long-running "Valencia" engine which had been with the Fiesta since the Mk1 - now known as Endura-E - in both 1.0 L and 1.3 L capacities. The chassis and suspension were also re-engineered to give vastly improved ride and handling.

In Brazil a 1.0 litre (Endura Engine) version was available in Popular trim level. Also a 1.3 litre (Endura) and a 1.4 litre 16V (Zetec-SE) was available in CLX trim level; it was sold in Argentina and Chile. The UK trim level line up had relatively few changes over the years: (1995, Encore, LX, Si, Ghia; 1996, Ghia X added as range-topper; 1998, Si replaced by Zetec, petrol LX models briefly renamed Zetec LX, Ghia X models axed; 1999, Finesse added between Encore and Zetec).

In 1997, the Mark IV was introduced in South Africa, the first time the Fiesta had been sold in that market. Only one engine was available, the 1.3 litre Endura E. It subsequently won the South African Car of the Year award. The 1.3 litre engine was replaced with the 1.4 litre PTE (CVH) engine in 1999.

The Mark IV was not sold in North America.

The German-built Ford Puma, launched in 1997, was based on the Mark IV, sharing its underpinnings. For this reason the 1.7 VCT engine from the Ford Puma has become an extremely popular engine swap into the Mark IV and Mark IV facelift Fiesta. This gives the popular hatchback an extra 100 cc over the previous largest engine size available, variable cam timing and better ratio gearbox while still retaining a factory finish as all components are a direct swap.

== Specifications ==
Engine type(s)	Inline-four engines: Petrol, Ford Kent/Endura-E (OHV), Zetec-SE (OHC), and Diesel (OHC)
Capacity	Petrol: 1,242–1,596 cc (75.8–97.4 cu in) Diesel: 1,753 cc (107.0 cu in)
Power	59–91 bhp (44–68 kW)
Max. speed	96–112 mph (154–180 km/h)
Acceleration	0-62 mph (100 km/h): 1.25 Zetec: 11.9 s 1.3: 16.4 s 1.4 Zetec: 10.8 s 1.8D: 14.7 s 1.8D: 16.2 s
Fuel efficiency	38–46 mpg_{‑imp} (31.6–38.3 mpg_{‑US}; 7.4–6.1 l/100 km)

== Facelift ==
In 1999, the Fiesta received a facelift aimed at giving the car a New Edge look, with a Focus-inspired face, new bumpers and wheel designs. The facelift is also known as Mark V (Mk5) in the United Kingdom and elsewhere.

Other changes include 1.6i 16V Zetec engine, fitted to the new Zetec S model, and later available in Ghia and Freestyle trims. New features were made available, such as side airbags and (after launch) the reintroduction of leather trim. An environmentally friendly E-Diesel model was released for 2001, with CO_{2} emissions of 120 g/km. The Lynx 1.8 TDDi engine was also introduced after launch.

The fourth generation facelift was the last generation of Fiesta to be built at Dagenham in England, and was indeed the final Ford model to be built at Dagenham prior to the closure of the car assembly plant in 2002. The internal code name of this Fiesta was still BE91. The UK trim level line-up consisted of: 1999, Encore, Finesse, Zetec, LX, Ghia; 2000, Zetec S added; 2001, E-Diesel added at bottom of range. Seeing the production of the fifth generation Fiesta, the Flight and Freestyle trims were respectively replaced by Finesse and Zetec.

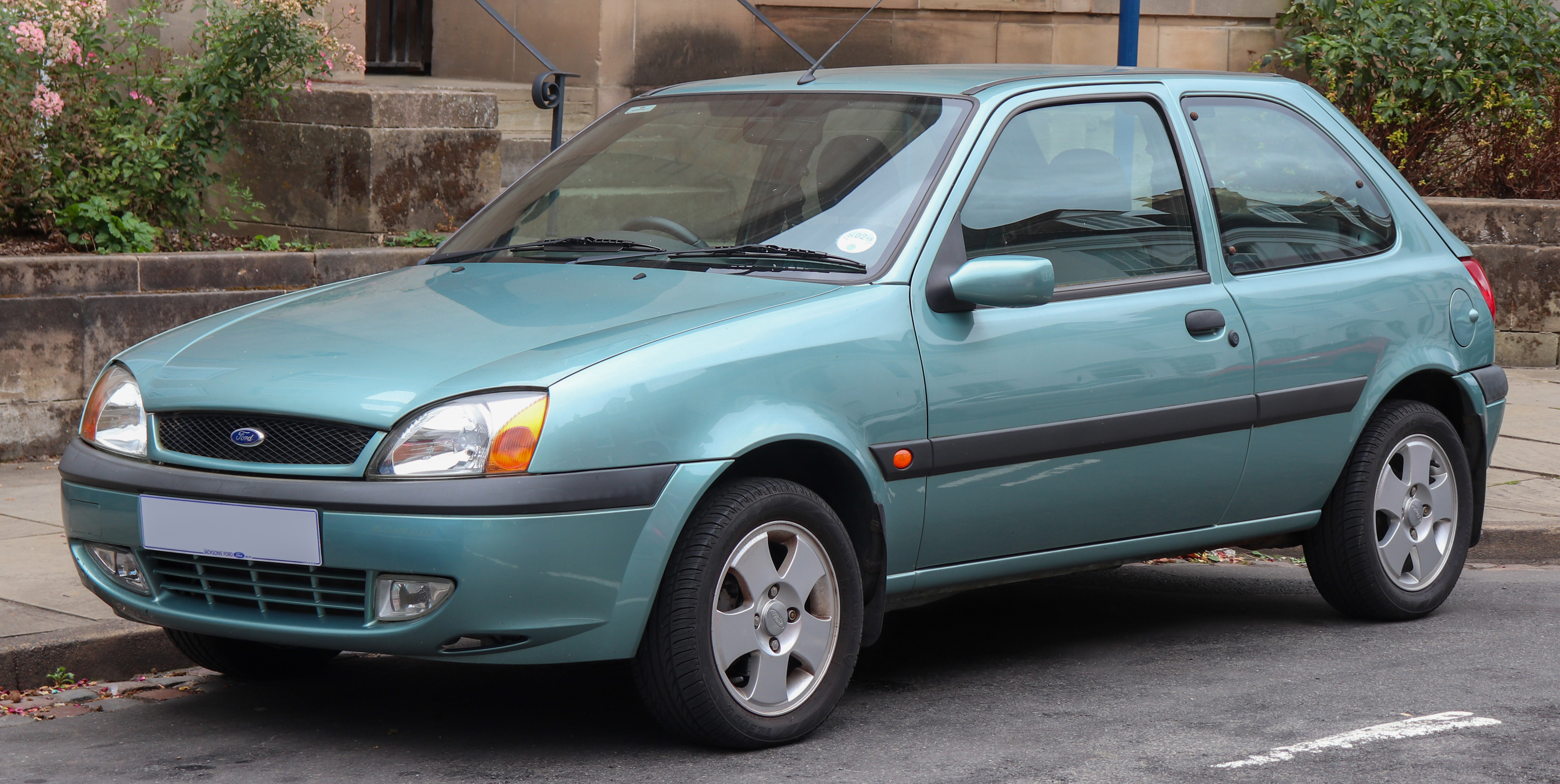
3-door (facelift)

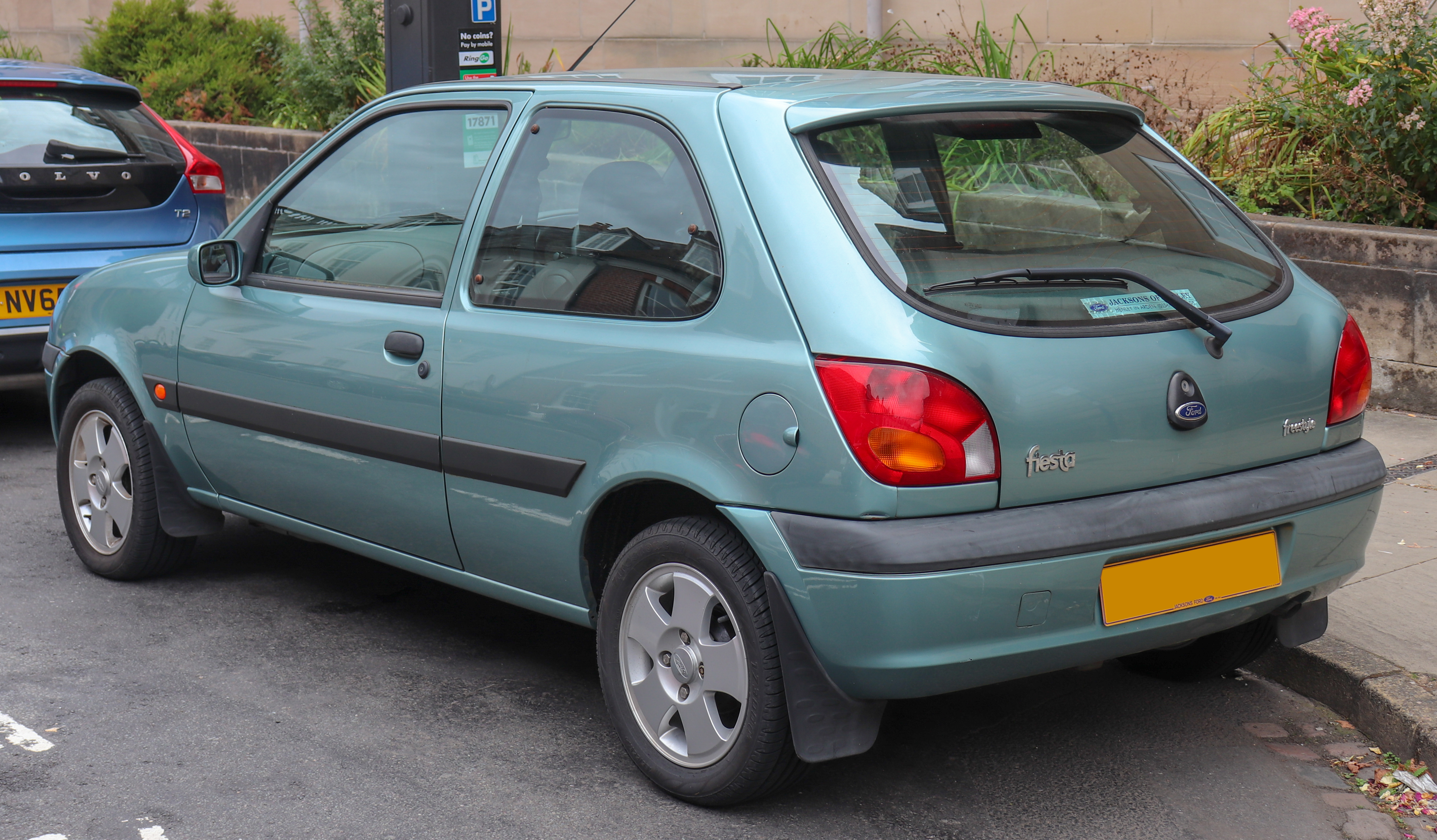
3-door (facelift)

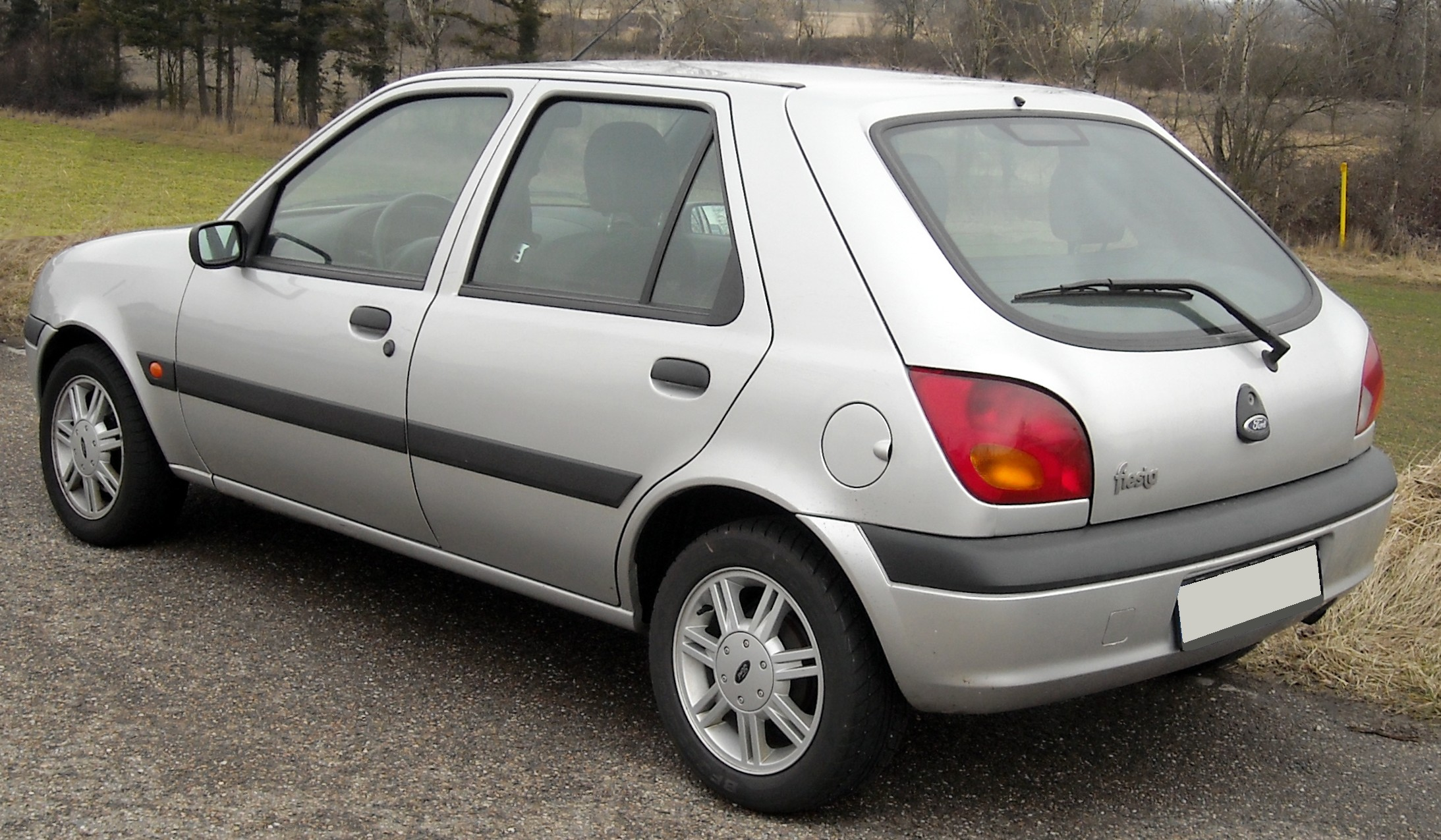
5-door (facelift)

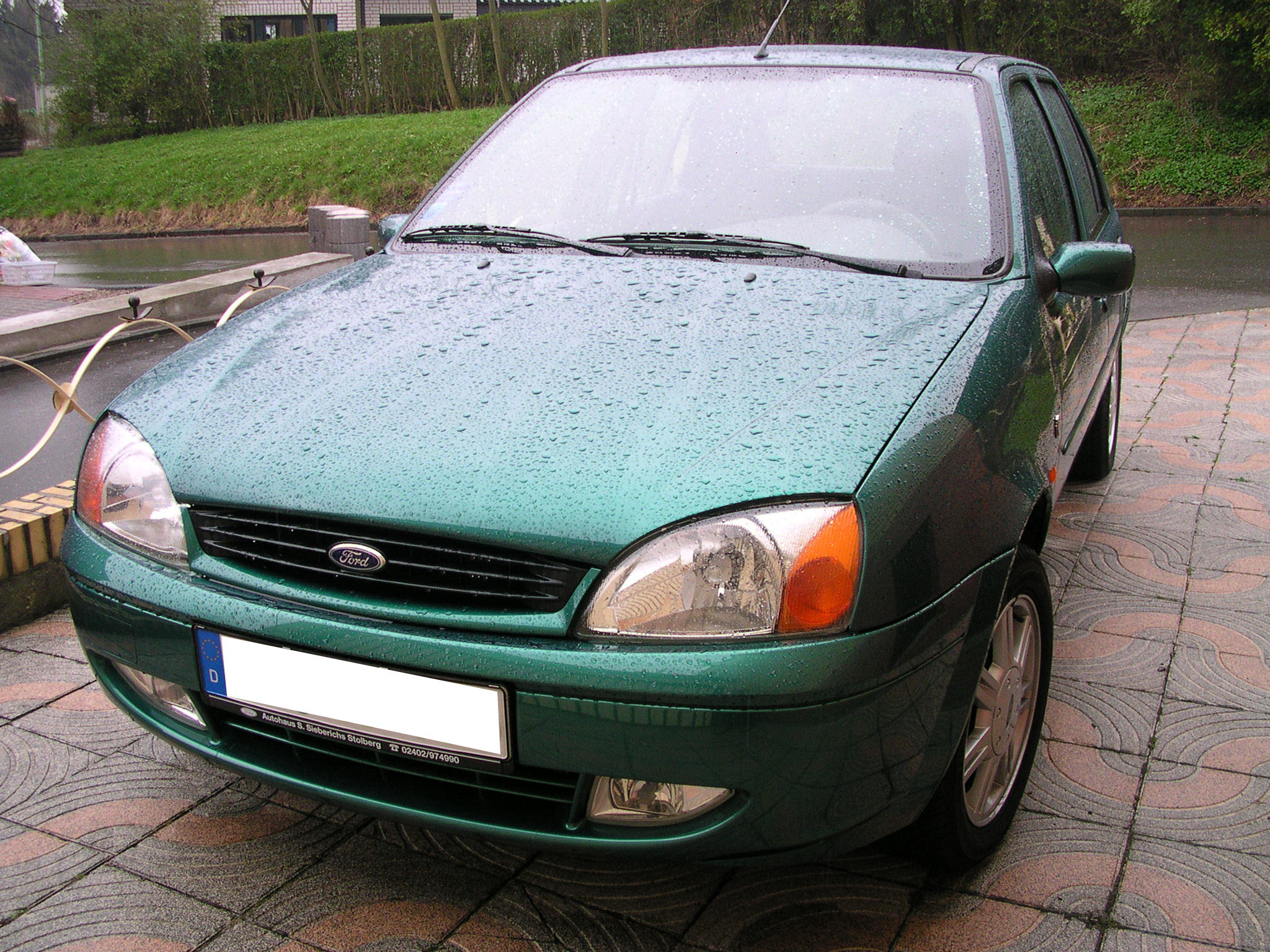
Facelift (With different grille design)

In South Africa, the facelift used the Port Elizabeth-built 1.3 L and 1.6 L Rocam engines, instead of the European Sigma 16-valve engines. This model formed the basis of the Ford Ikon (code name C195), which is a four-door saloon designed for India, where Ford was then producing cars in a joint venture with Mahindra. The Ikon was also introduced in other developing countries, such as Brazil (where it is known as the Fiesta Sedan), South Africa, Mexico (where it was called Fiesta Ikon) and China, where saloons are preferred to hatchbacks. They are extremely reliable, and became one of Ford's successes.

There were also four utility variants, the simplest being the "Fiesta Van" which was a three-door hatchback with the rear quarter windows blanked over and the rear seat omitted (in other words, a sedan delivery).

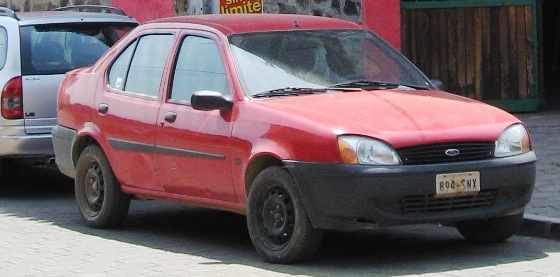
Latin American market

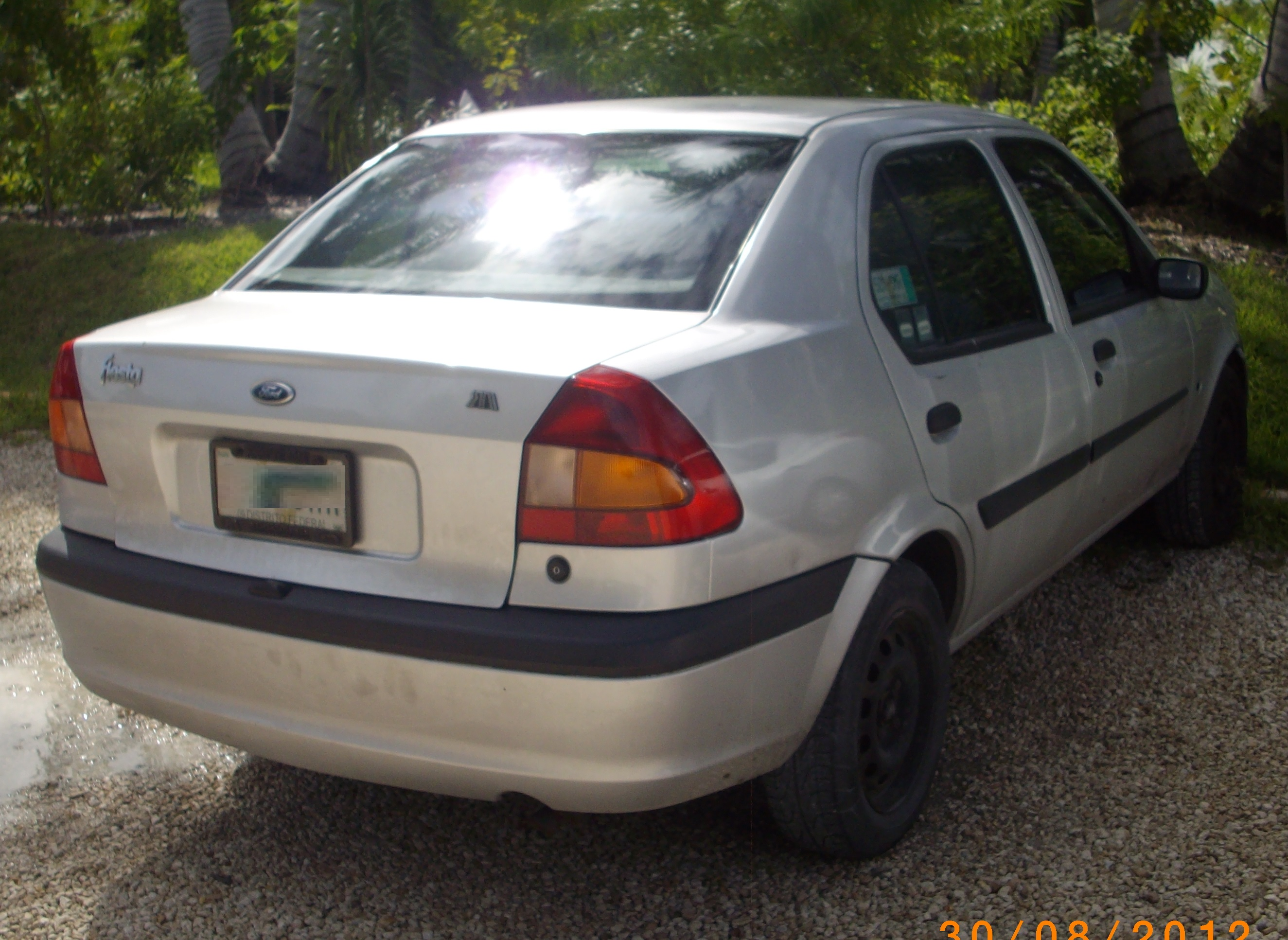
Latin American market

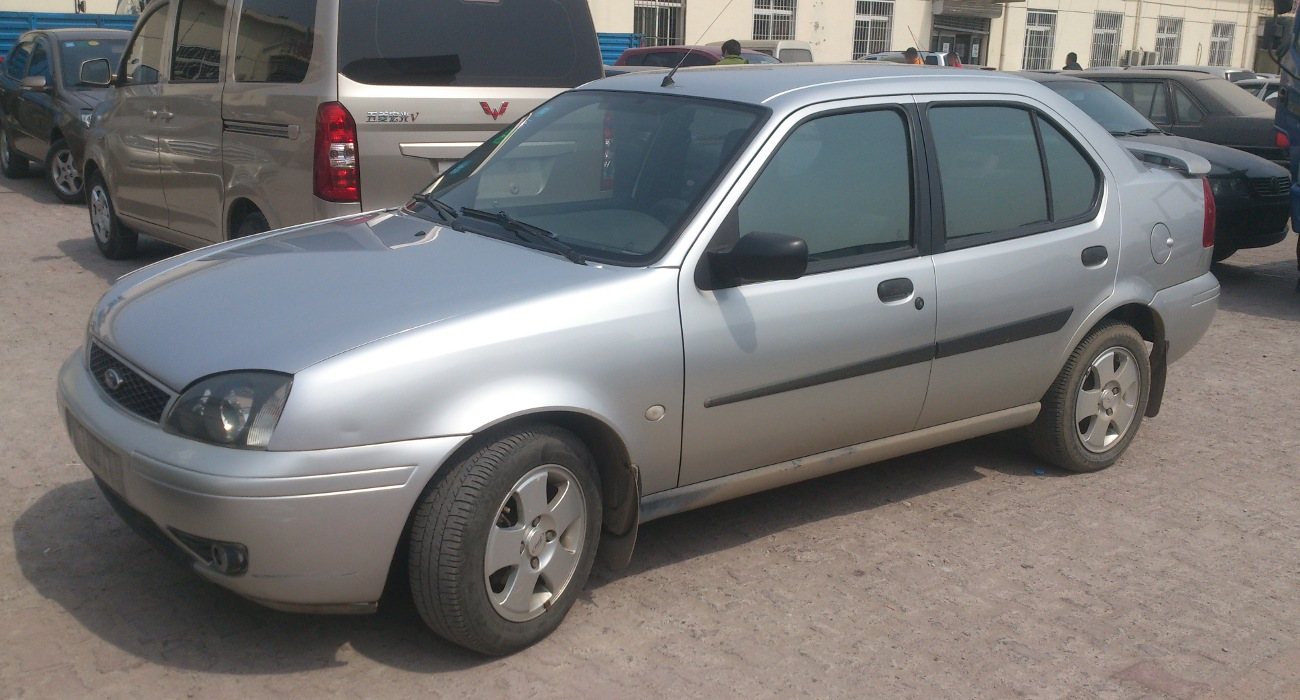
Chinese market

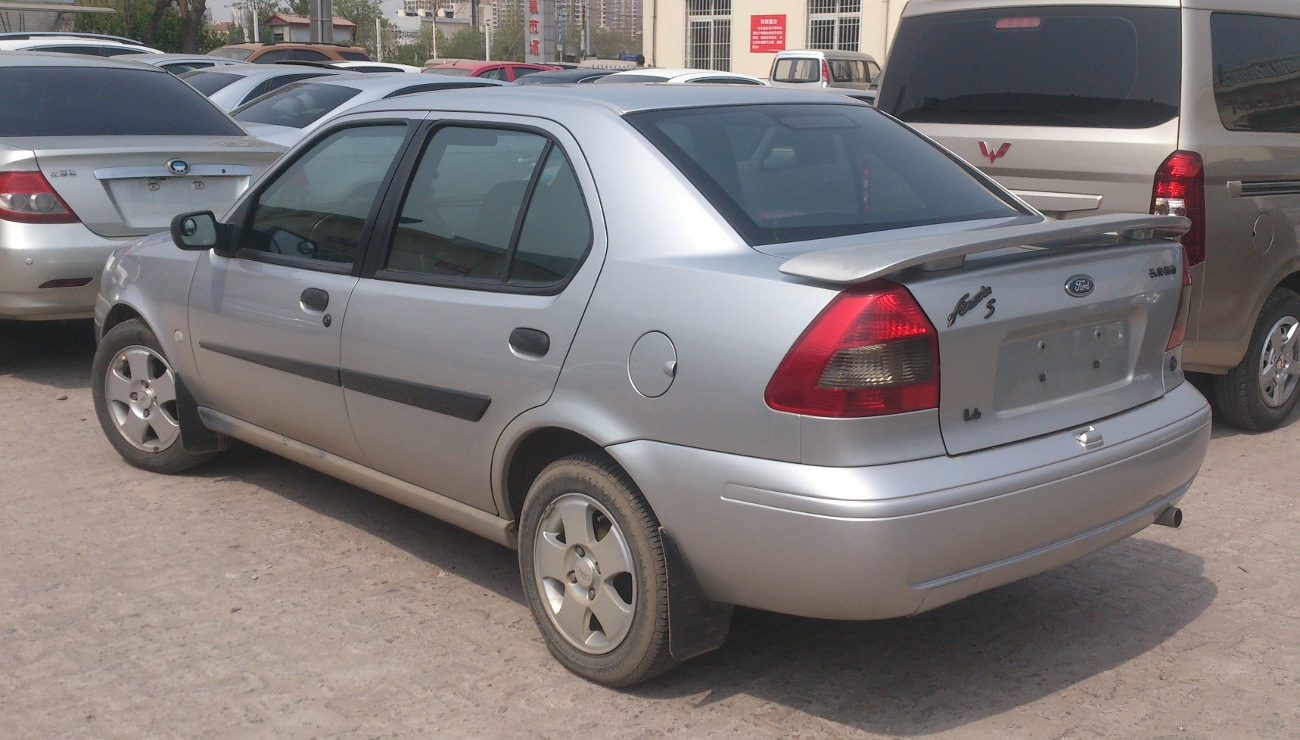
Chinese market

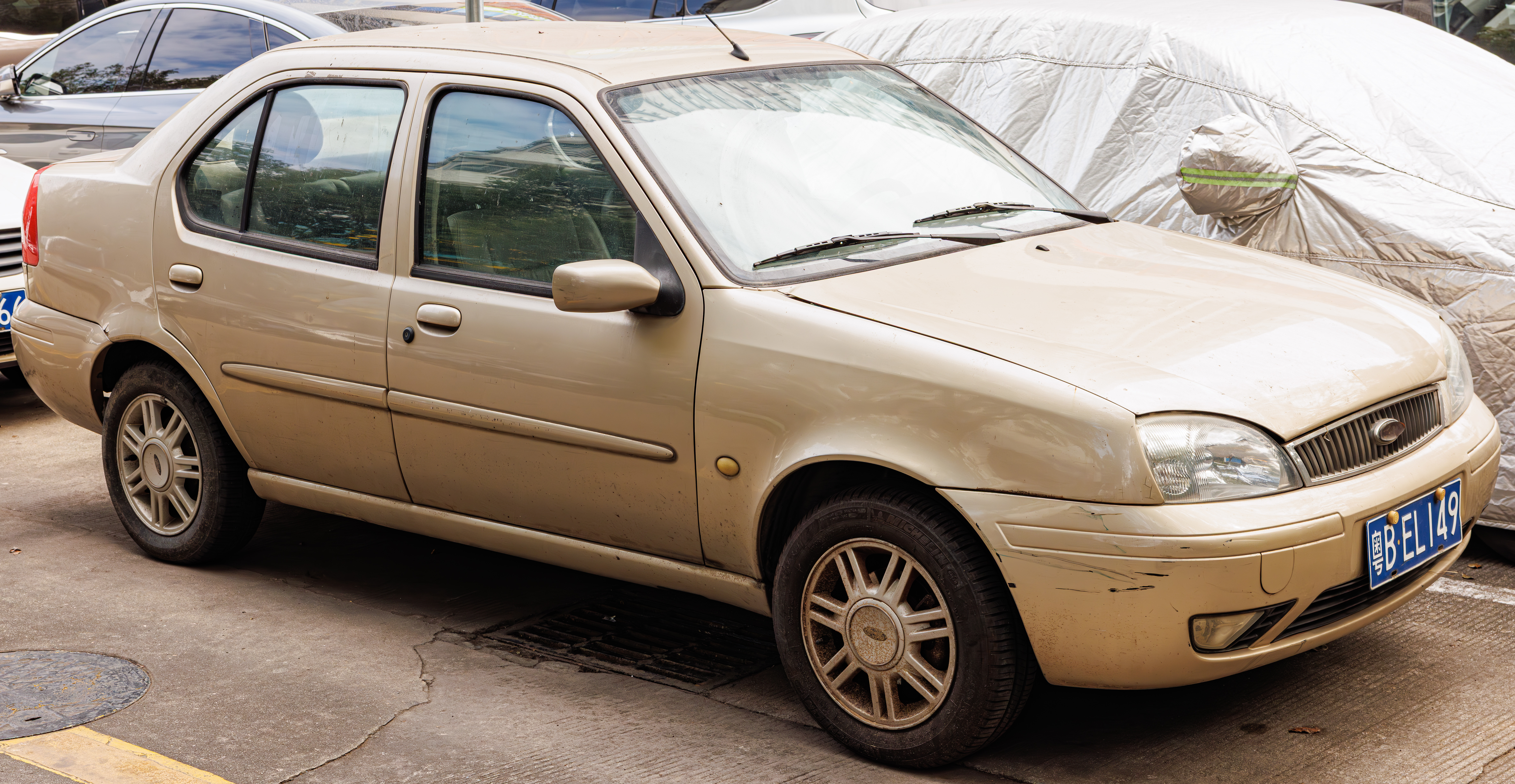
Chinese market

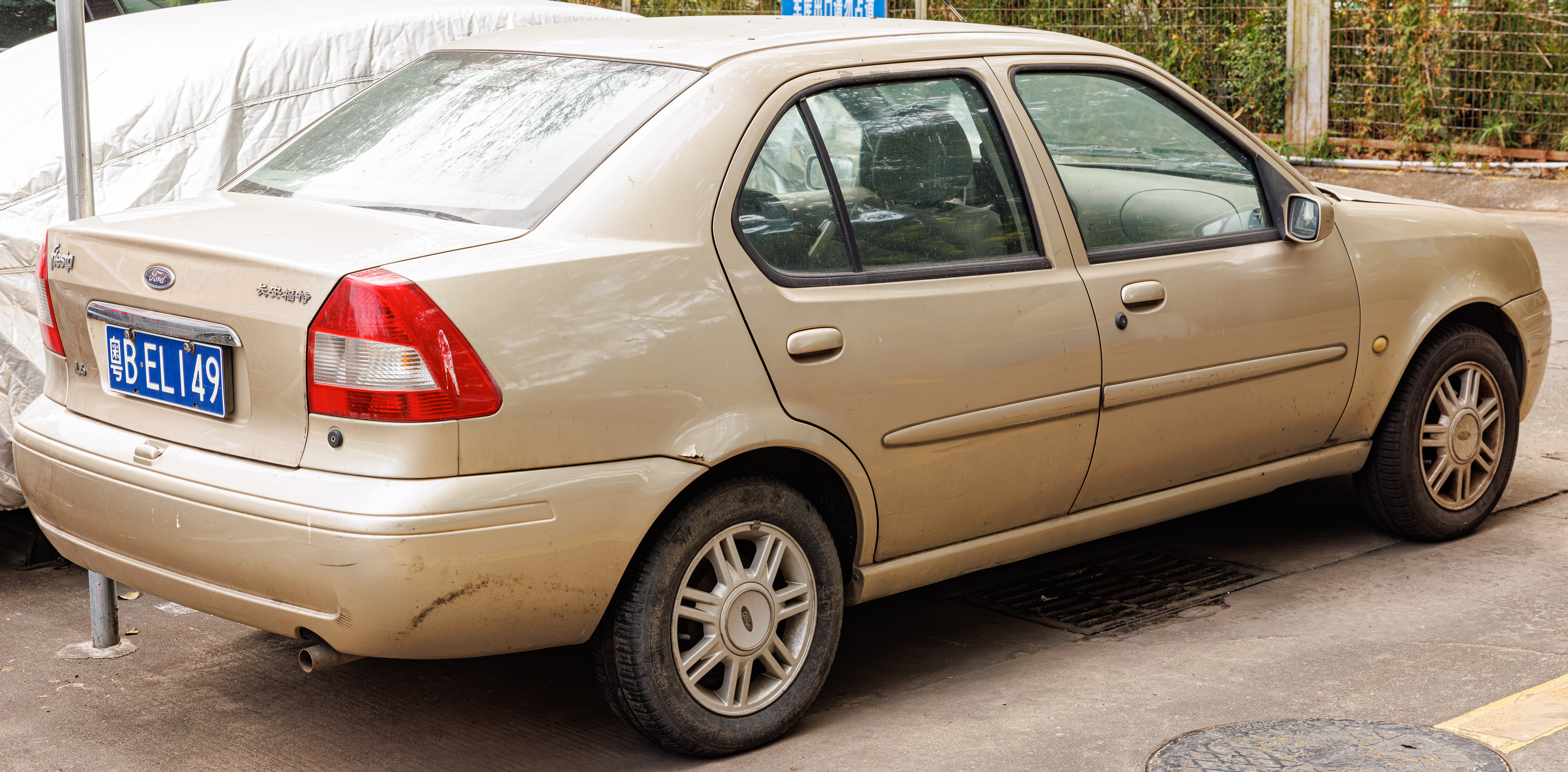
Chinese market

The Fiesta was still Britain's best-selling supermini in 2001, by which time it was making use of a design over a decade old (though heavily updated visually and mechanically). In three-door form, it was sold alongside the fifth generation Fiesta from April to December 2002. In Brazil, it was sold as the Fiesta Street until 2006. This generation was also assembled in China by Changan Ford Mazda in sedan form only from 2003 to 2008 and continued until 2010 by Landwind (a joint venture marque between Changan Automobile and Jiangling Motor Holding) as Landwind CV7, this car was also exported as Changan CV7. There was a version with sporty bumpers sold in China as CV7 Sport with 1.5 L 94bhp petrol engine.

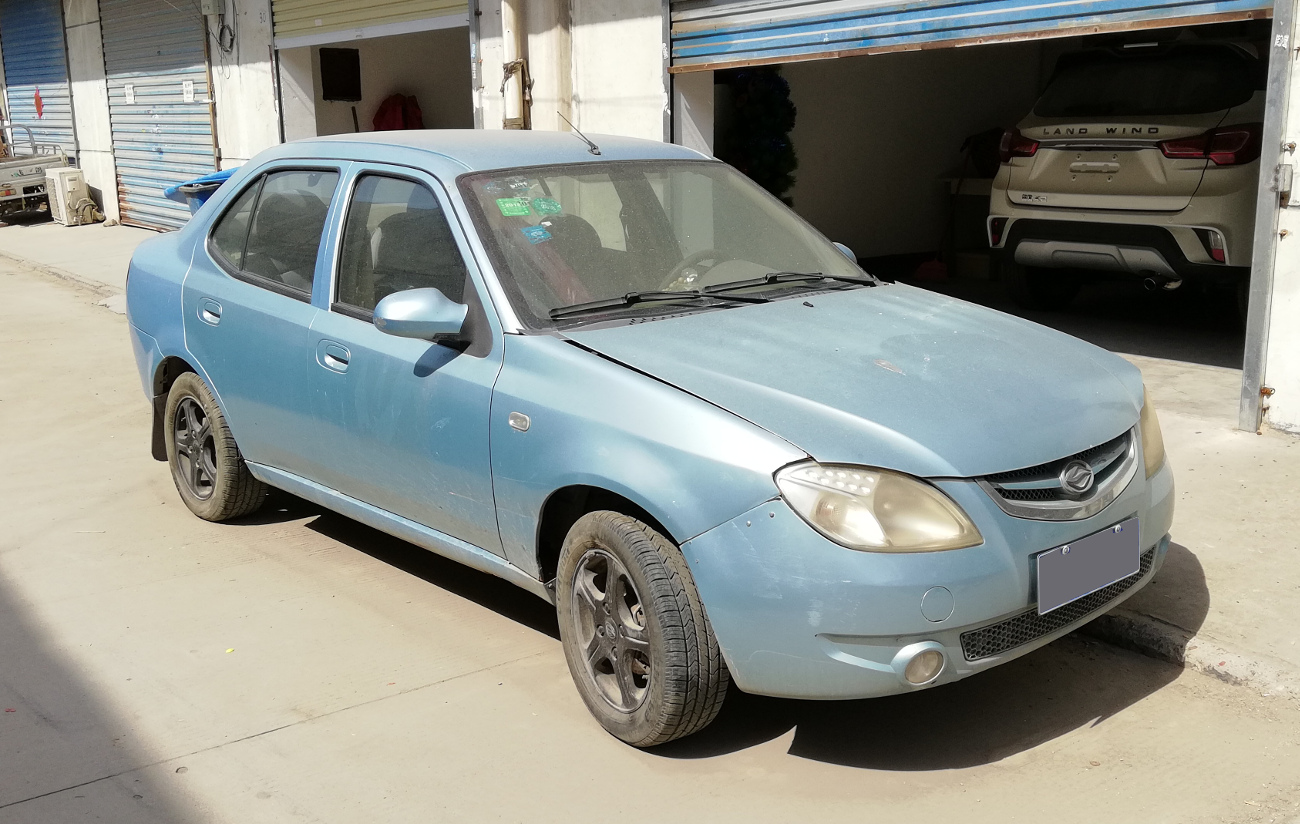
Landwind CV7

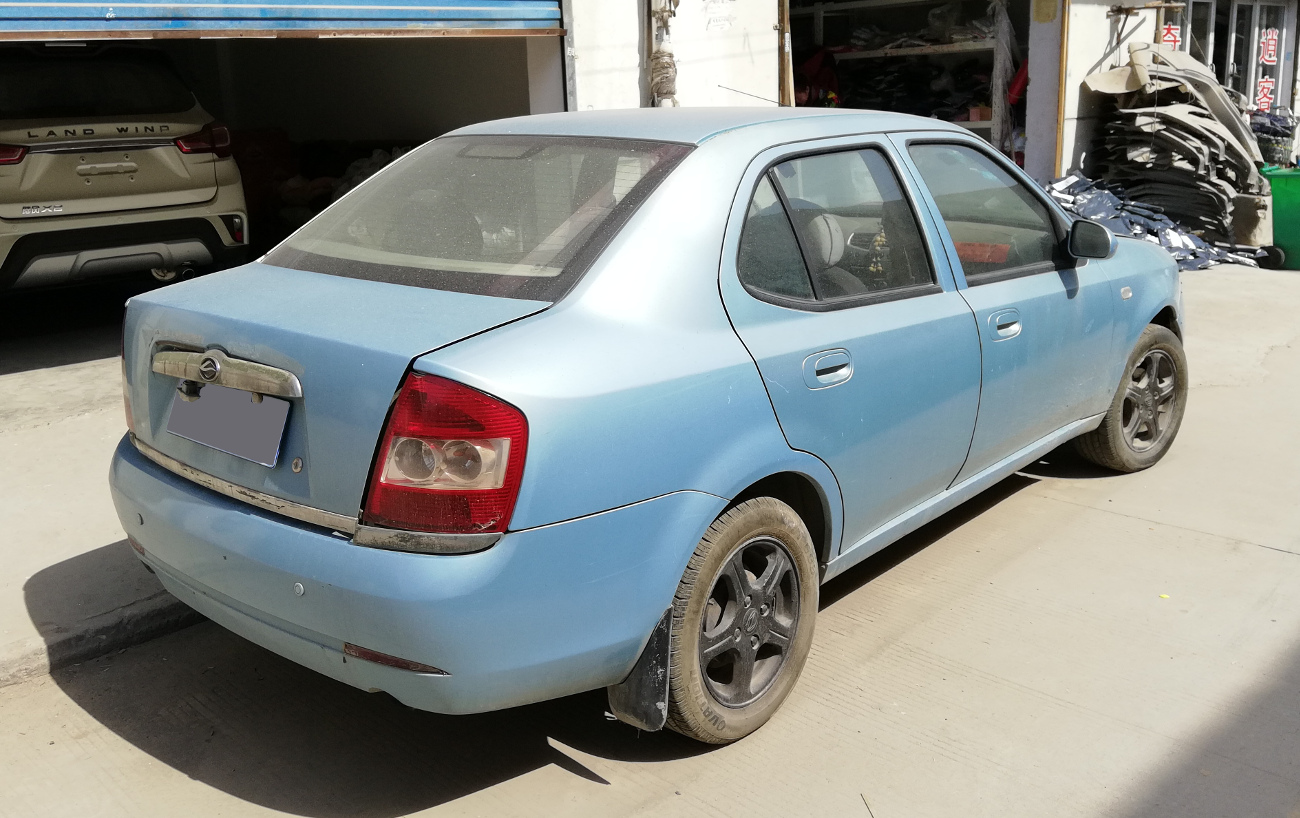
Landwind CV7

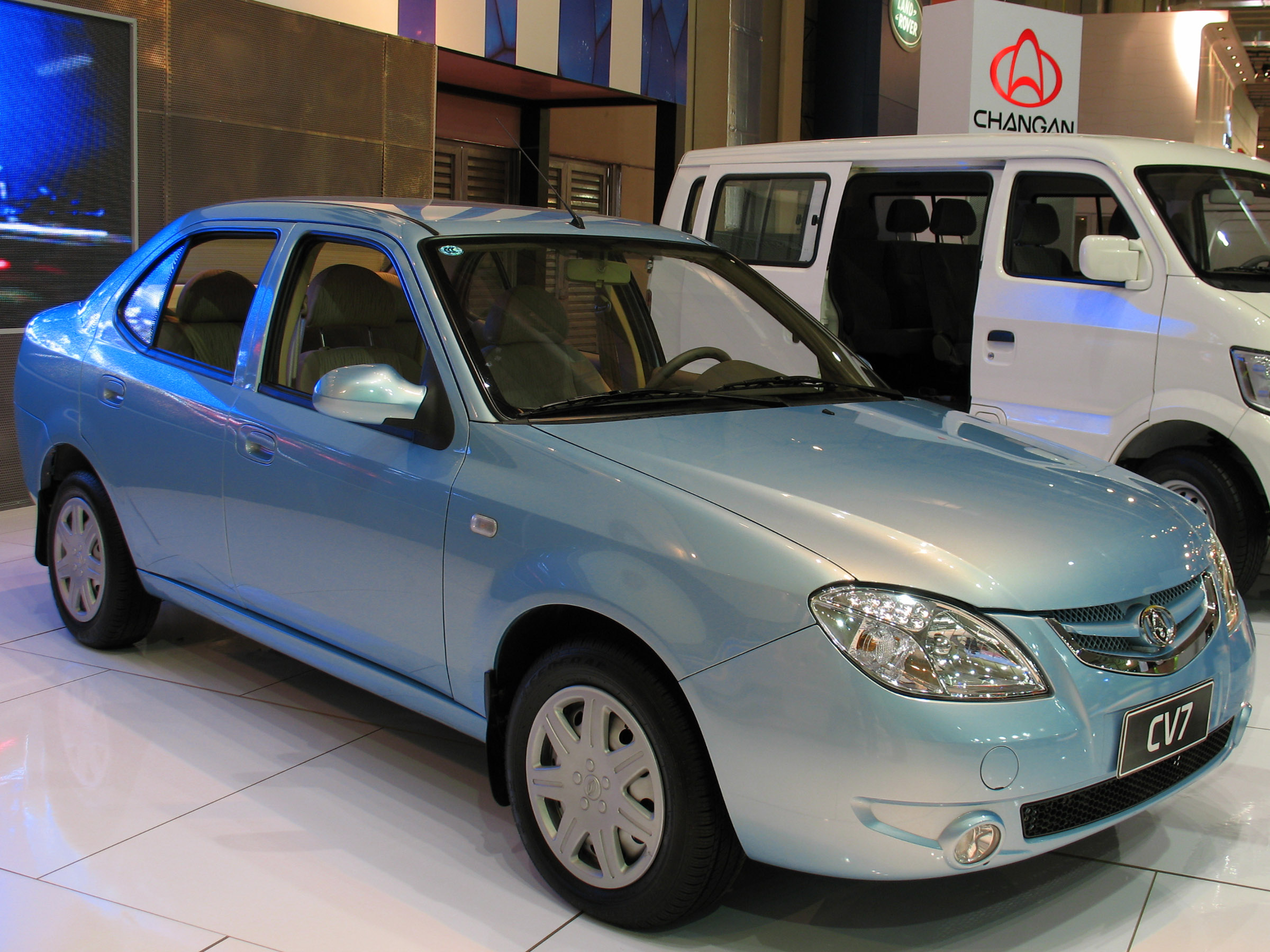
Changan CV7

== Zetec S ==
The Zetec S was the highest Fiesta trim, and although its 1.6 L 16v Sigma engine was available in other Fiestas (such as the Freestyle) the Zetec S pushed out 101 bhp (75 kW; 102 PS), and had major alterations to the suspension, with stiffer anti-roll bars and uprated brakes shared with the Puma.

The fifth generation facelift Zetec S has an online following, with many websites dedicated to the vehicle. There is also a tuning culture devoted to this model, with reputable companies such as Milltek Sport and Shawspeed developing performance parts solely for the Sigma engine.

Zetec S was also offered in South Africa as Fiesta RSi and in Brazil as GLX Sport, both has 1.6 8v Rocam engine. In China, there was a sporty sedan version called Fiesta S.

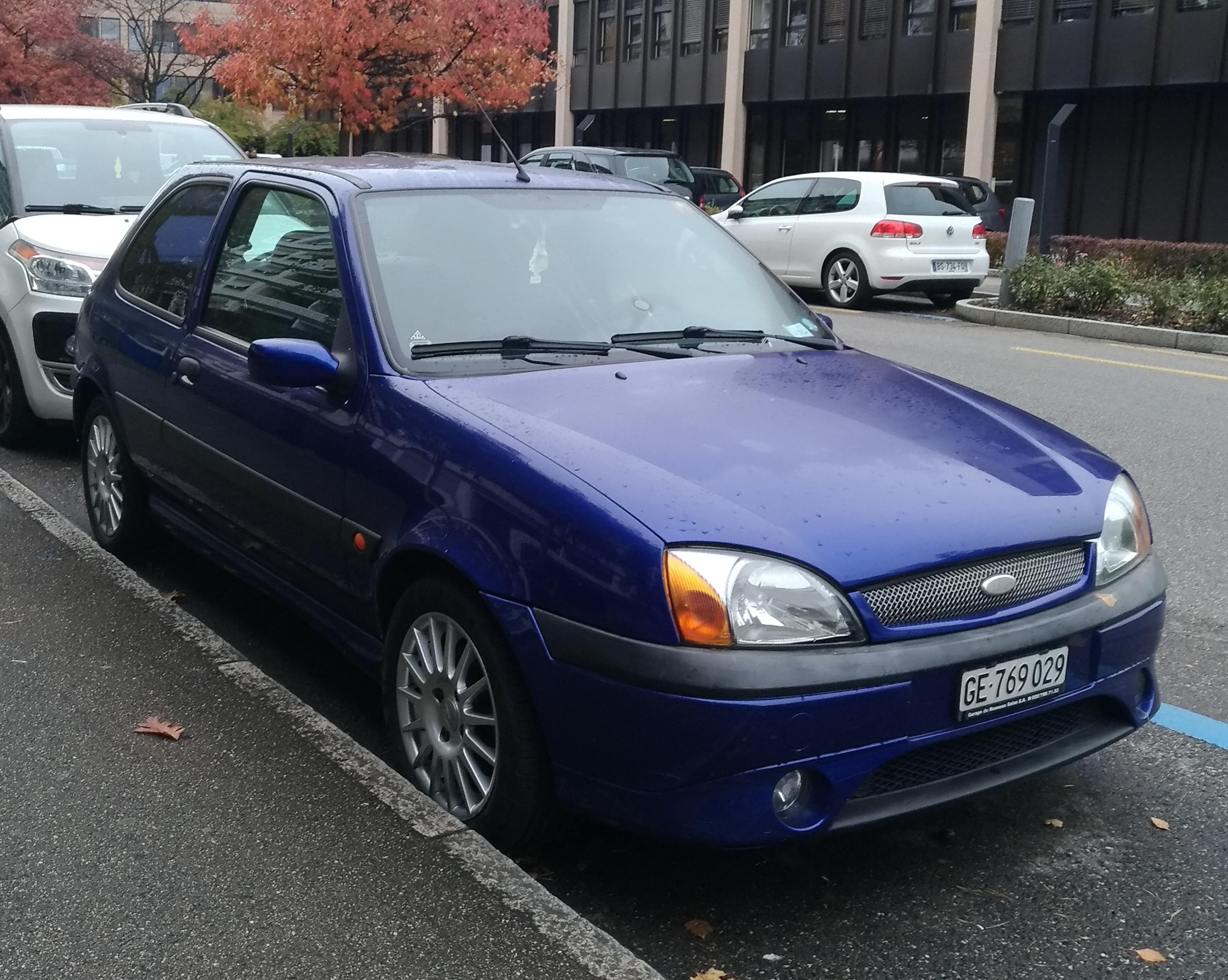
Ford Fiesta 1.6 16v Zetec S Limited Edition

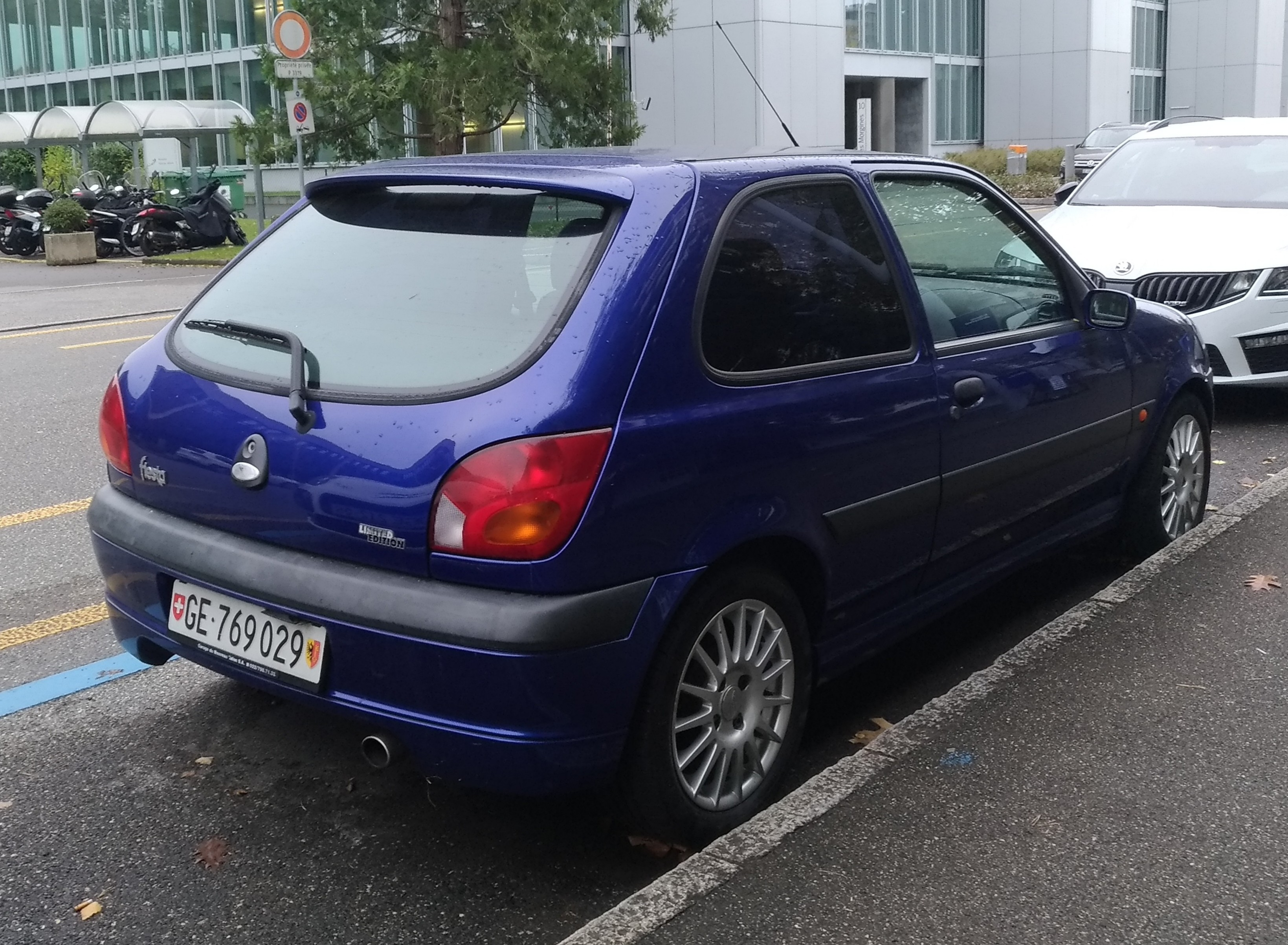
Ford Fiesta 1.6 16v Zetec S Limited Edition

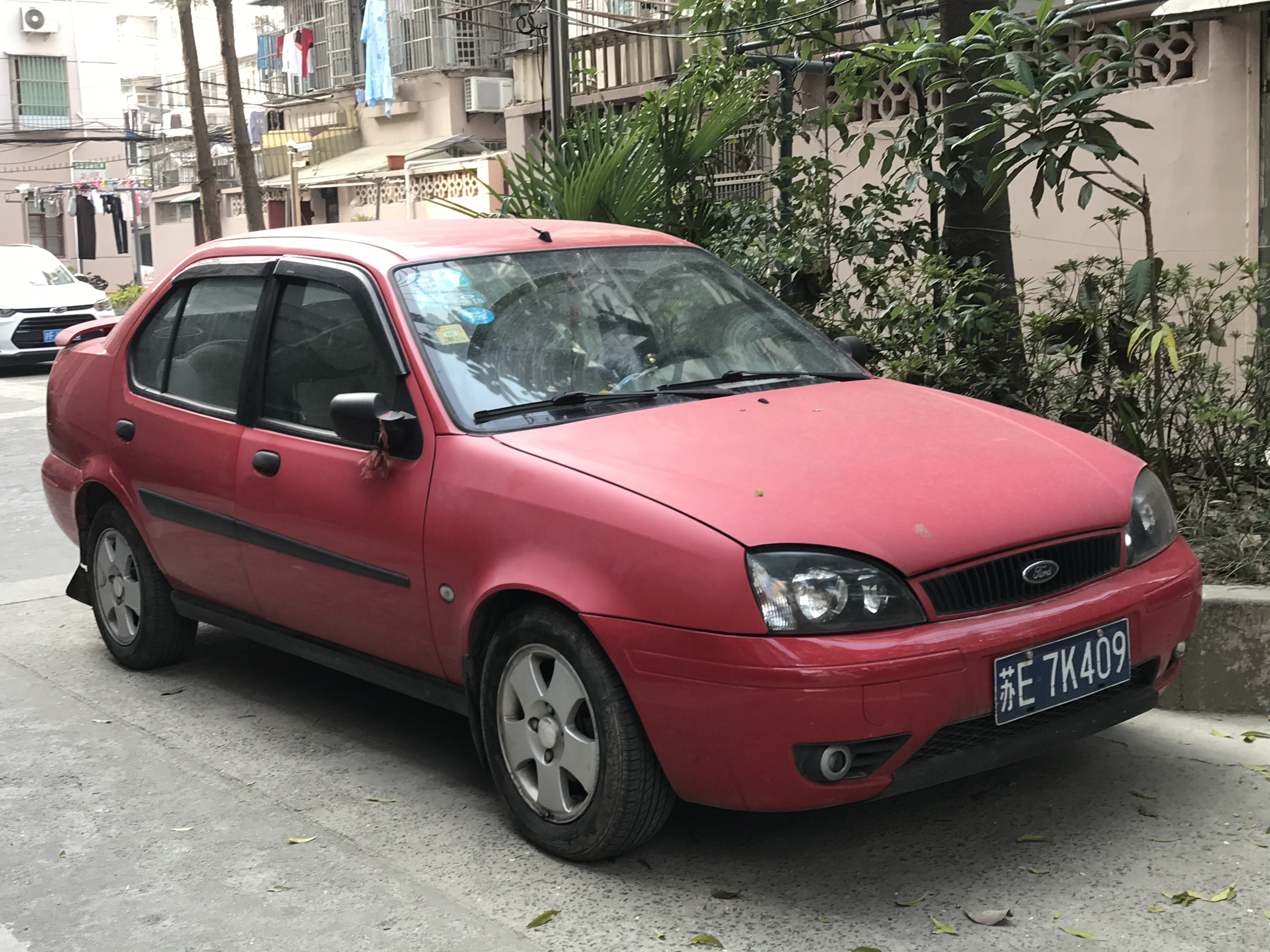
Chinese market Ford Fiesta 1.6 S sedan

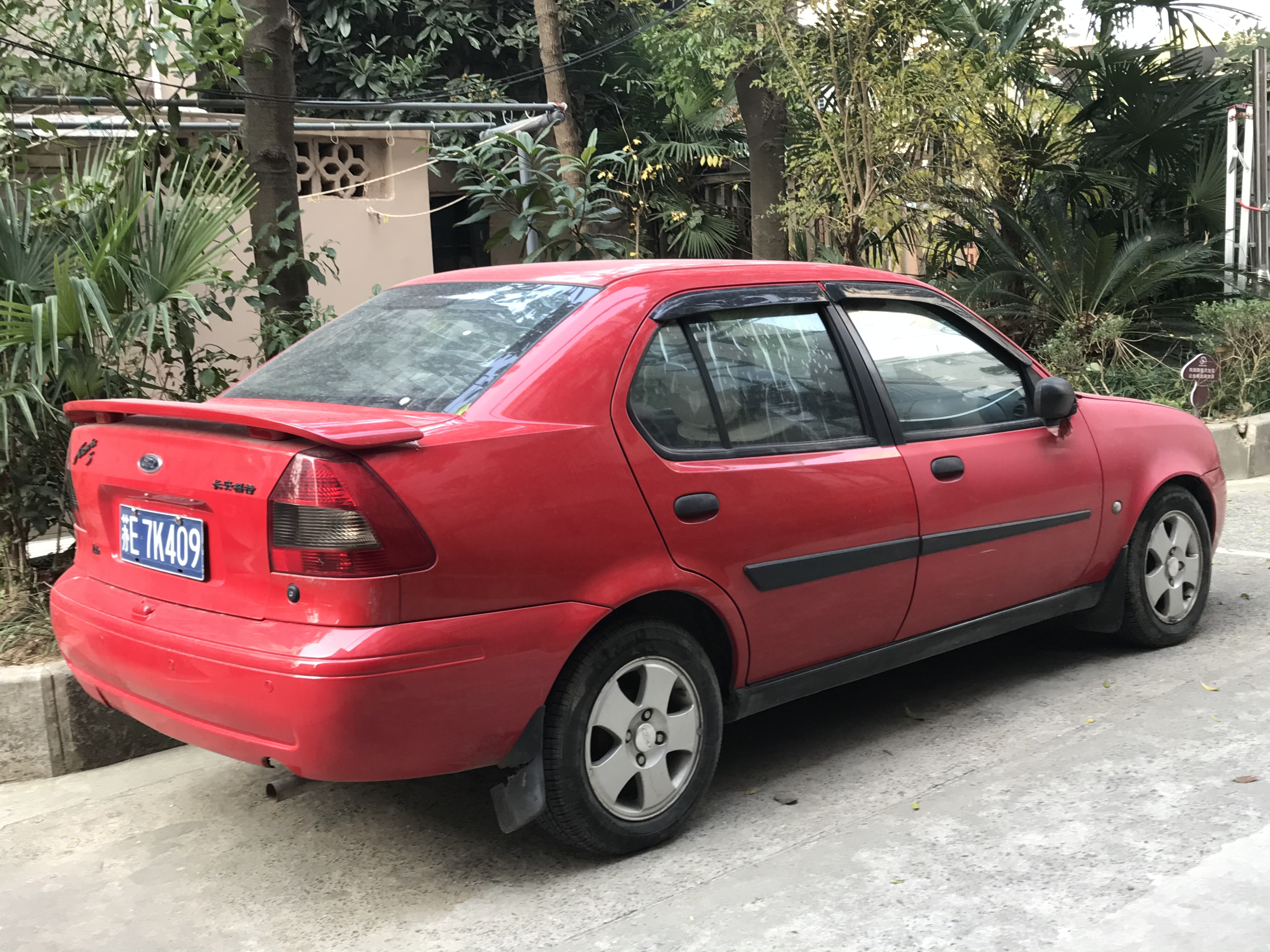
Chinese market Ford Fiesta 1.6 S sedan

Specifications:

Engine type(s)	Inline-4: Petrol, Zetec SE (DOHC) 16v, Rocam (SOHC) 8v
Capacity	Petrol: 1,596 cc (97.4 cu in)
Power	103 bhp (77 kW)
Max. speed	190 km/h (120 mph)
Acceleration	0–100 km/h (62 mph) 10.0 seconds
Fuel efficiency	33.6 mpg_{‑imp} (28.0 mpg_{‑US}; 8.4 l/100 km)

== Mazda 121 ==
As an exercise in badge engineering, the Mazda 121 and Ford Fiesta Mark IV shared their design, were built on the same production lines and used almost all the same parts. At the same time, Mazda also marketed a rebadged first generation Mazda Demio with 121 nameplate in several Asian countries and Australia.

In the JD Power reliability surveys at the time, the Mazda was reported to be significantly more reliable and attracted higher levels of customer satisfaction, despite it being a slower seller than the Fiesta.

It was also sold locally as the Mazda 121 Soho, although it is often referred to simply as the "Mazda Soho".

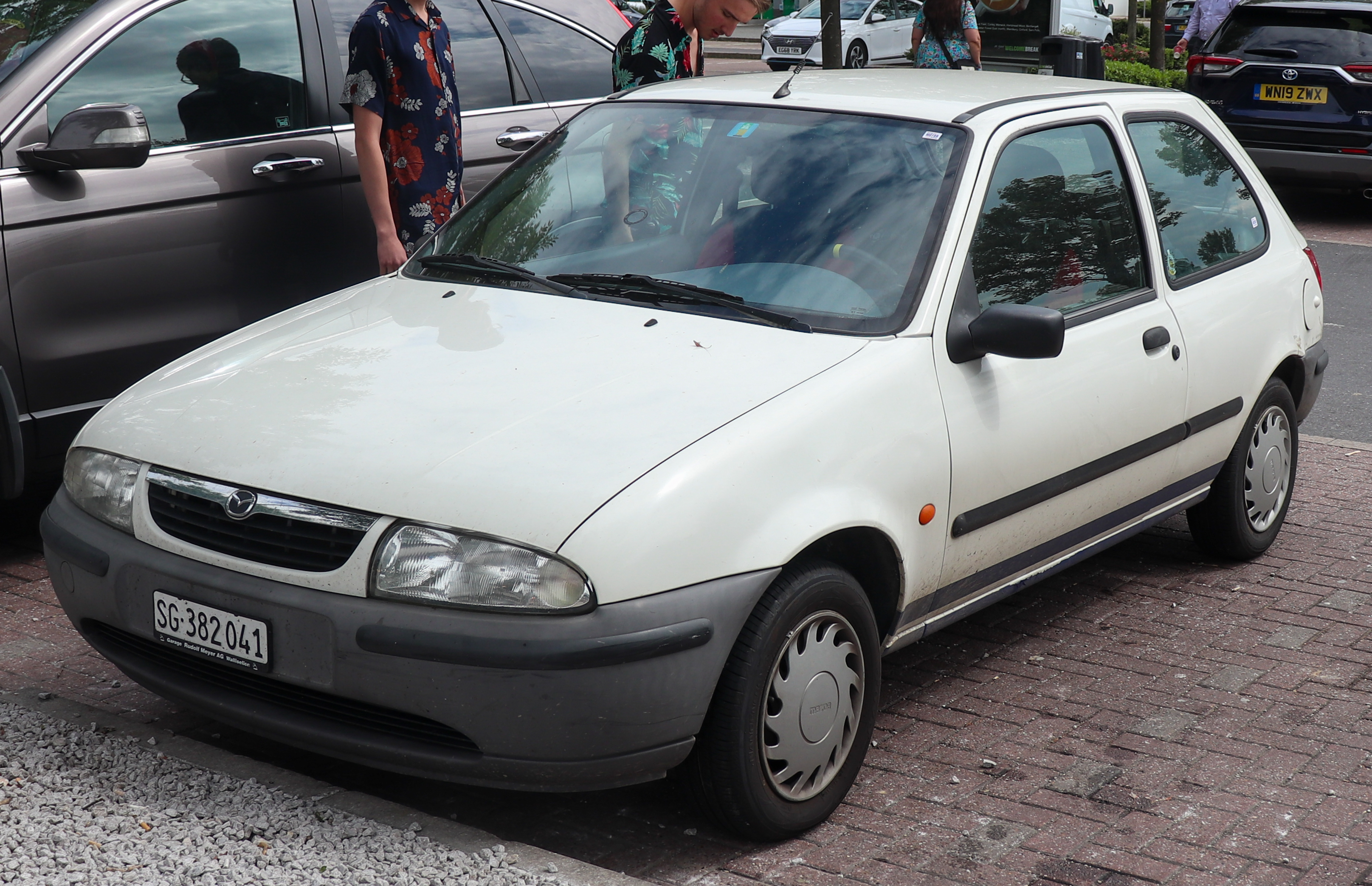
Mazda 121 3-door hatchback (pre-facelift)

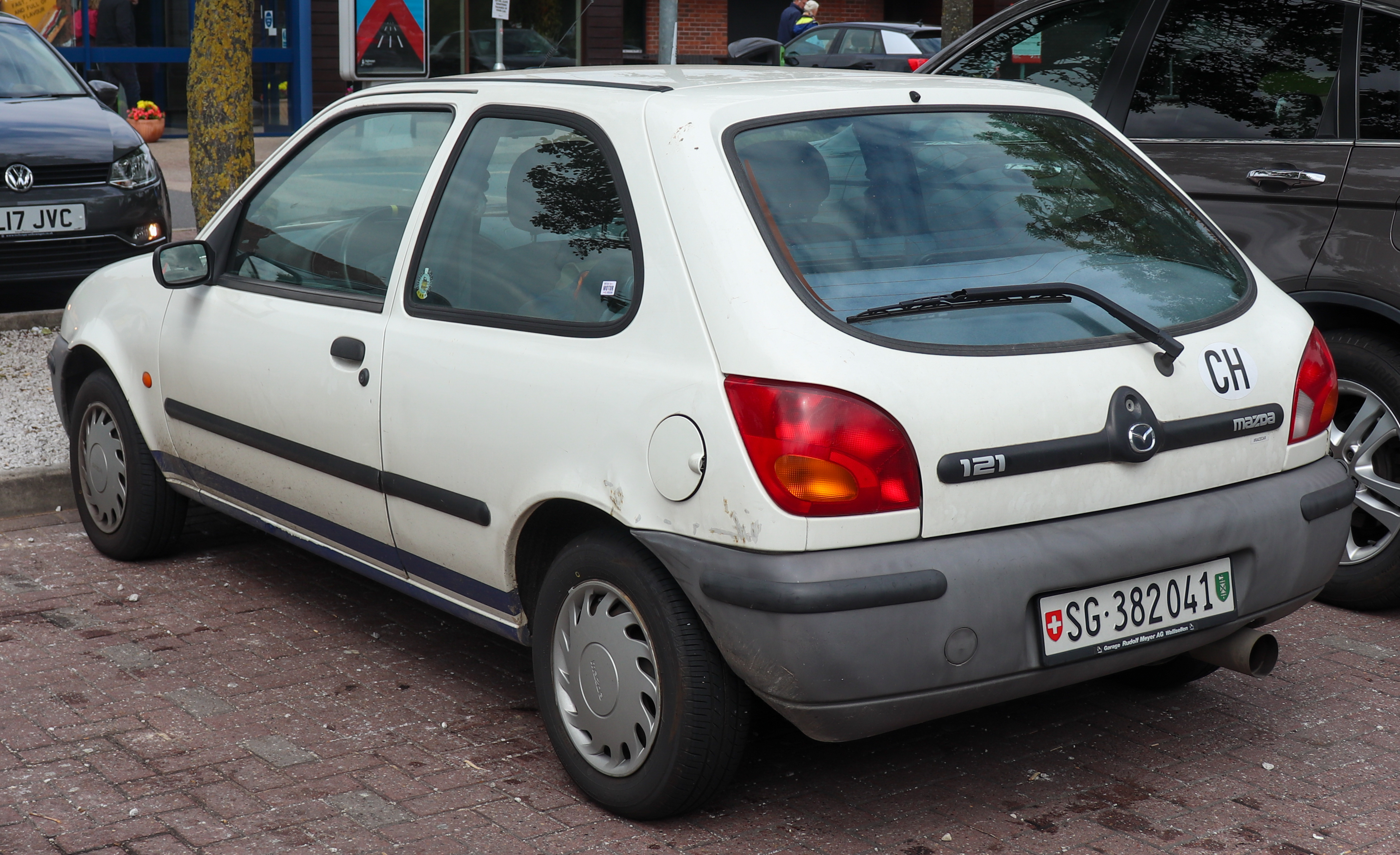
Mazda 121 3-door hatchback (pre-facelift; post-1997 logo)

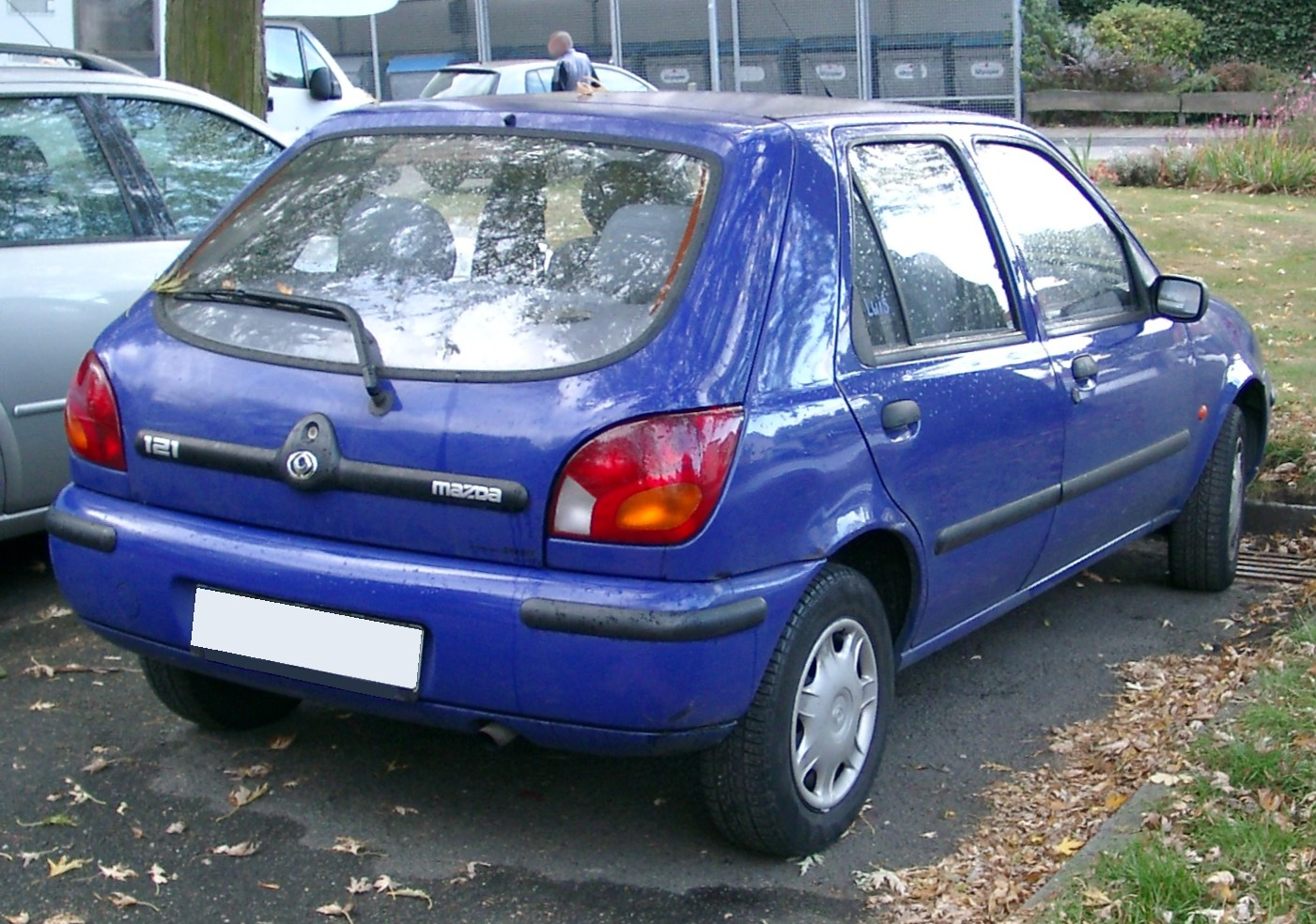
Mazda 121 5-door hatchback (pre-facelift; pre-1997 logo)

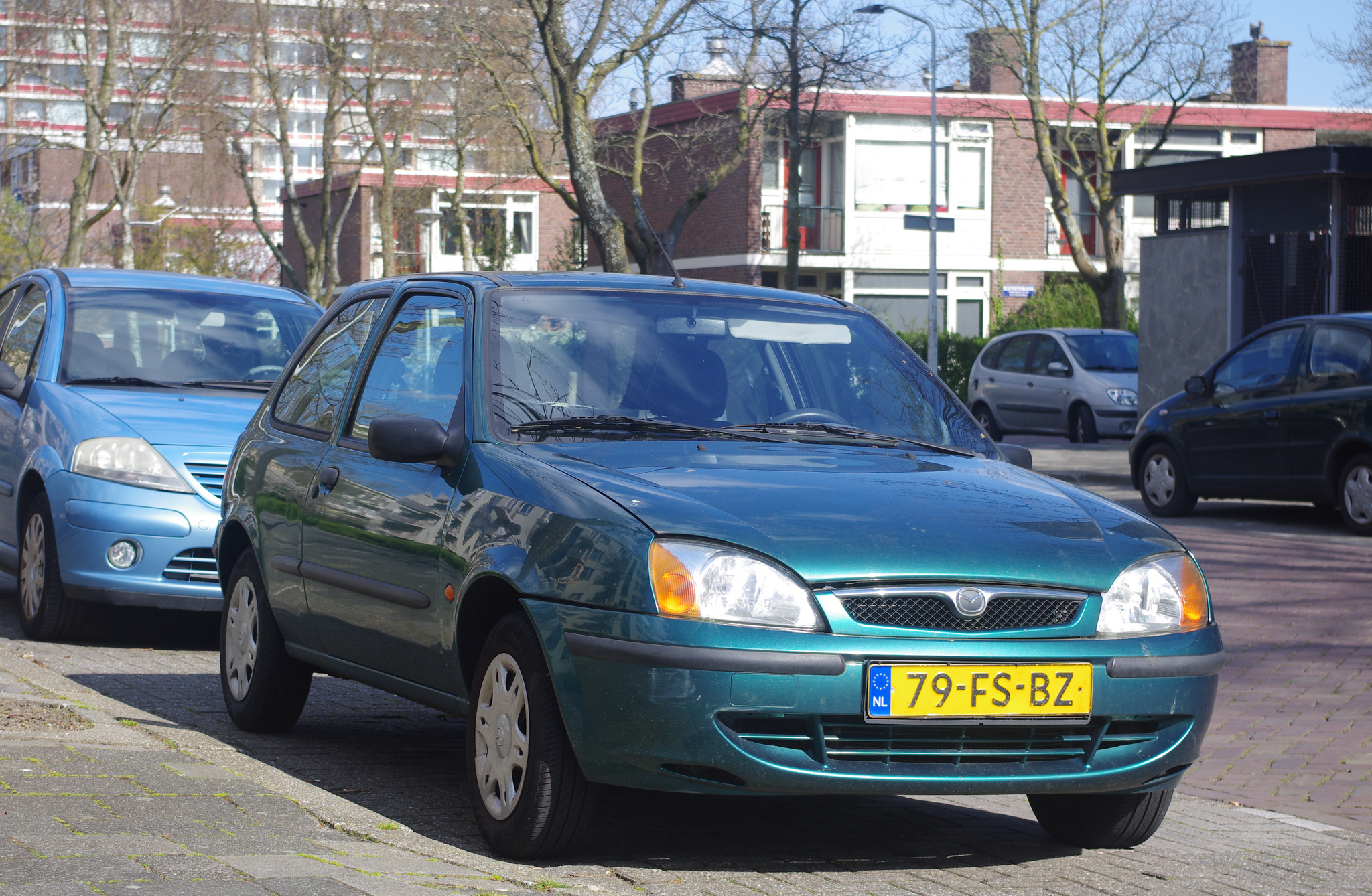
Facelift

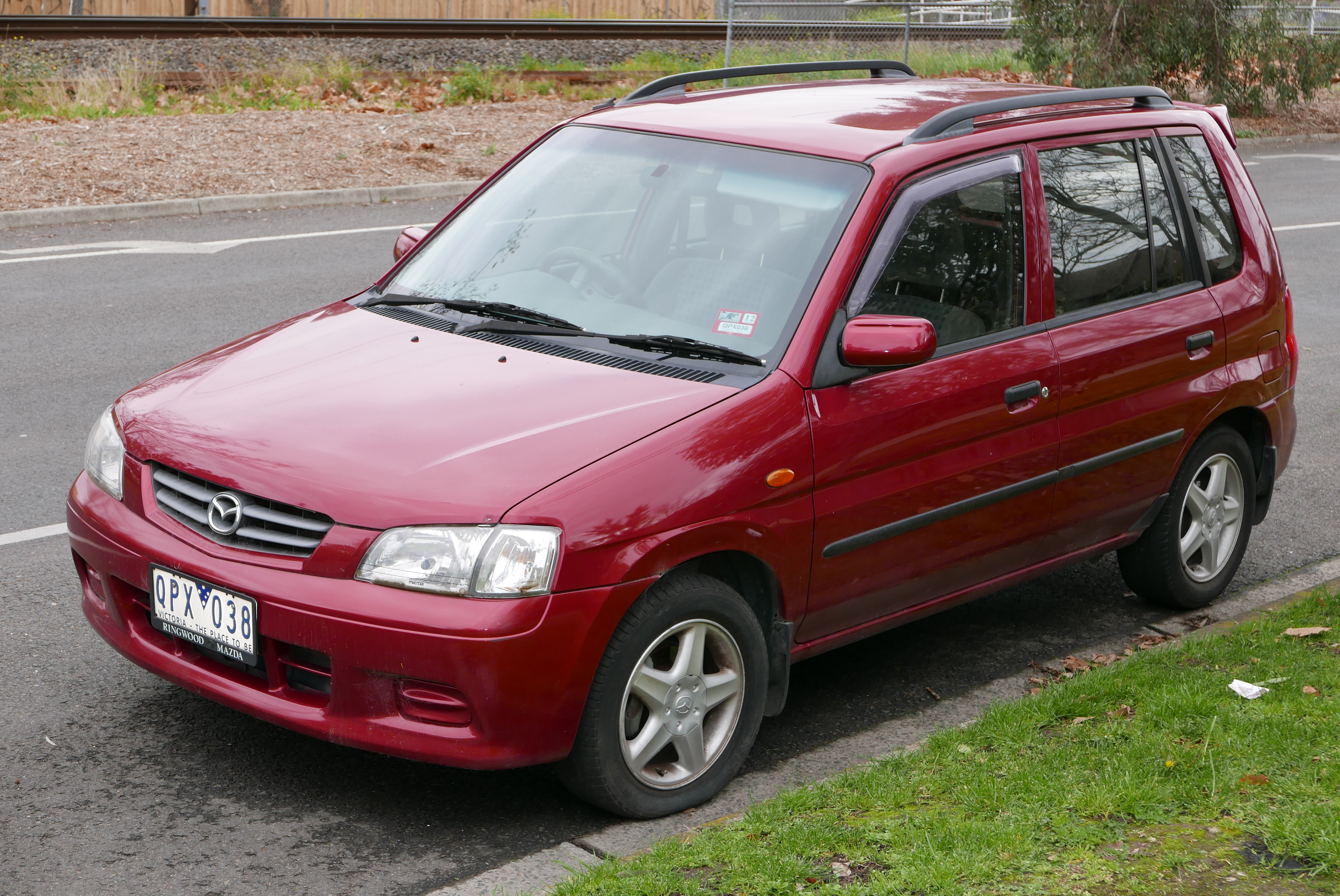
Mazda Demio-based 121 model that was offered for other markets at the same sales period

== Derivative models ==
There were several derivative models based on Fiesta Mark IV, shared the same front to middle sheet metals design and mechanicals.

A van with a boxy rear body and stretched wheelbase used the Courier nameplate and formed the basis of two coupe utility models, one with the short doors of the 5-door hatchback and small quarterlights in the style of larger extended cab pick-ups, made in South Africa as the Ford Bantam; and another with the 3-door's longer doors and no quarter windows, made in Brazil as the Ford Courier.

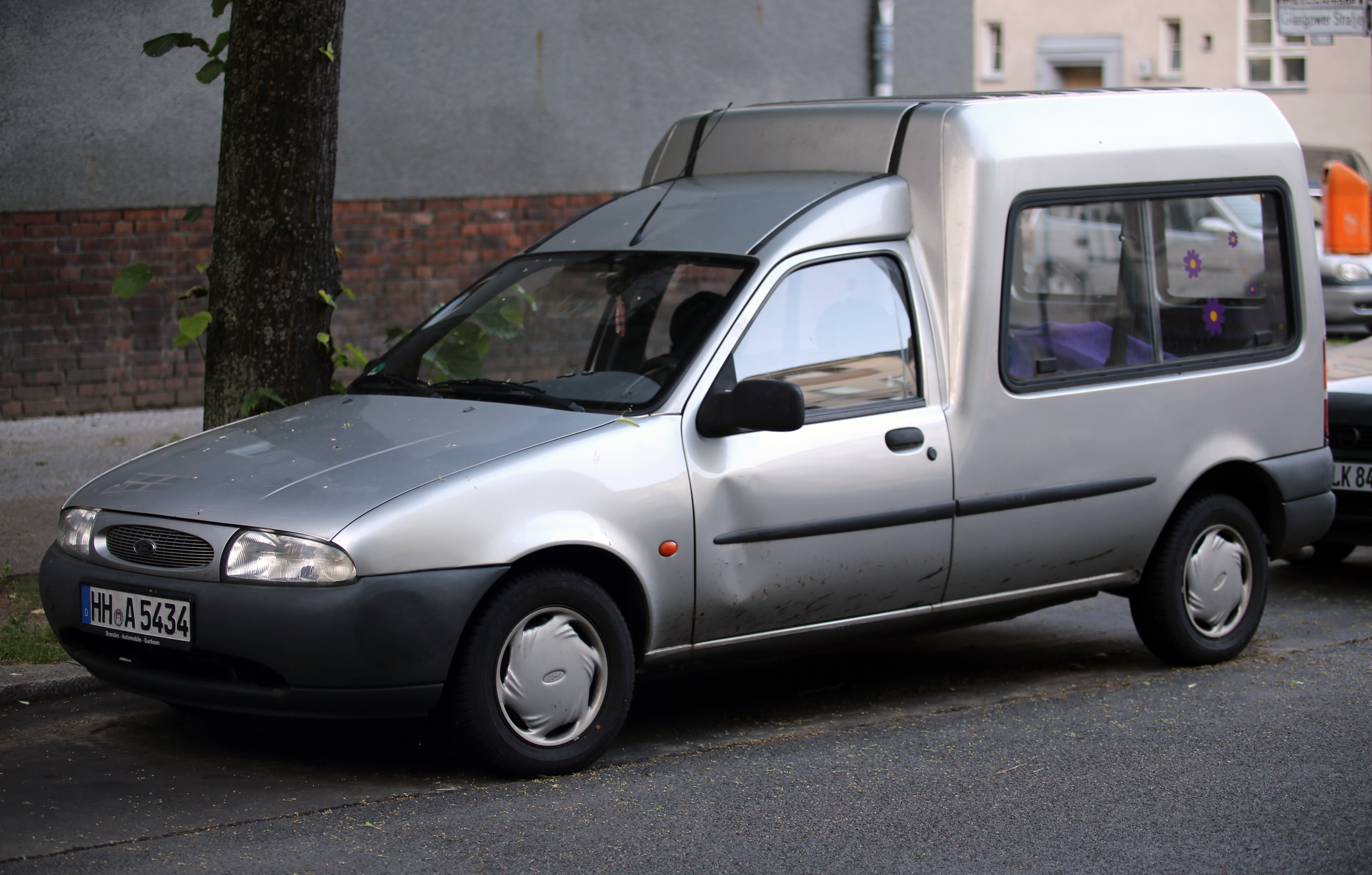
Ford Courier panel van

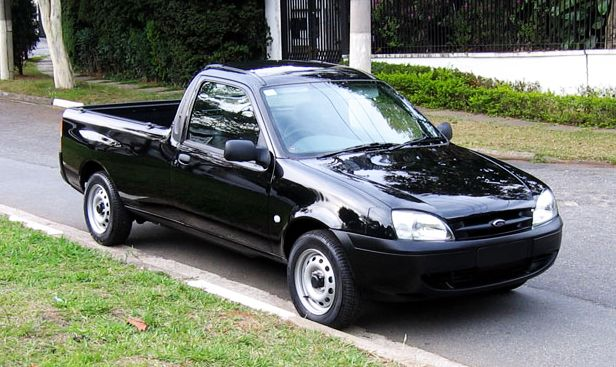
Ford Courier coupe utility

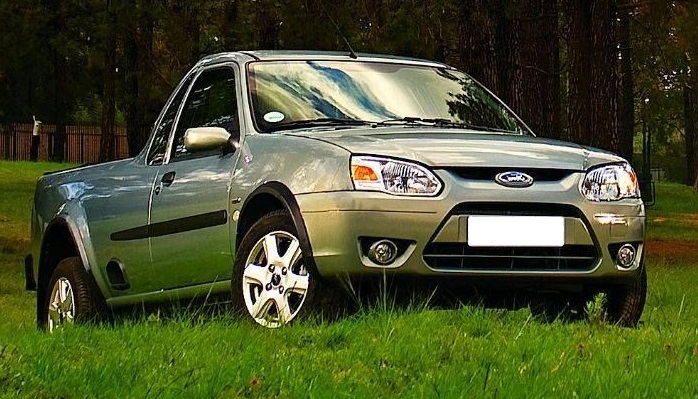
Ford Bantam bakkie
