= Landwind CV7 =

Chinese subcompact sedan

Landwind Forward (CV7)
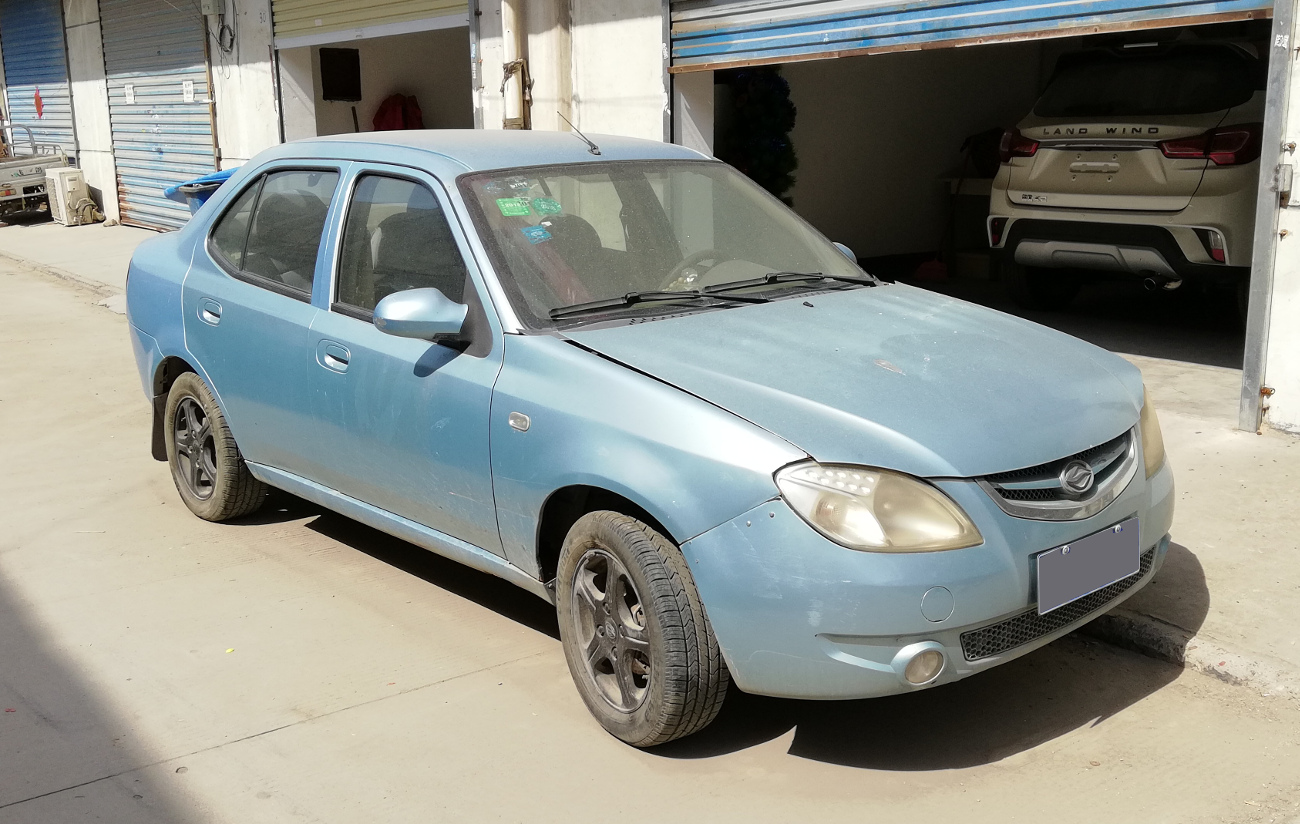

Overview
- Manufacturer: Landwind
- Also called: Landwind Forward; Landwind Fenghua (风华)
- Production: 2007–2011
- Model years: 2007–2011

Body and chassis
- Class: Subcompact car/Supermini (B)
- Body style: 4-door sedan
- Layout: Front-engine, front-wheel-drive
- Related: Ford Fiesta (fourth generation)

Powertrain
- Engine: 1.3 L JL474Q8 I4; 1.5 L JL475Q8 I4
- Transmission: 5-speed manual

Dimensions
- Wheelbase: 2,492 mm (98.1 in)
- Length: 4,167 mm (164.1 in)
- Width: 1,635 mm (64.4 in)
- Height: 1,430 mm (56.3 in)

Chronology
- Successor: Changan Alsvin

The Landwind CV7 or Landwind Forward is a subcompact sedan produced by Chinese auto maker Landwind. It was based on the fourth generation Ford Fiesta licensed by Ford through its joint venture with Changan Auto.

== Overview ==
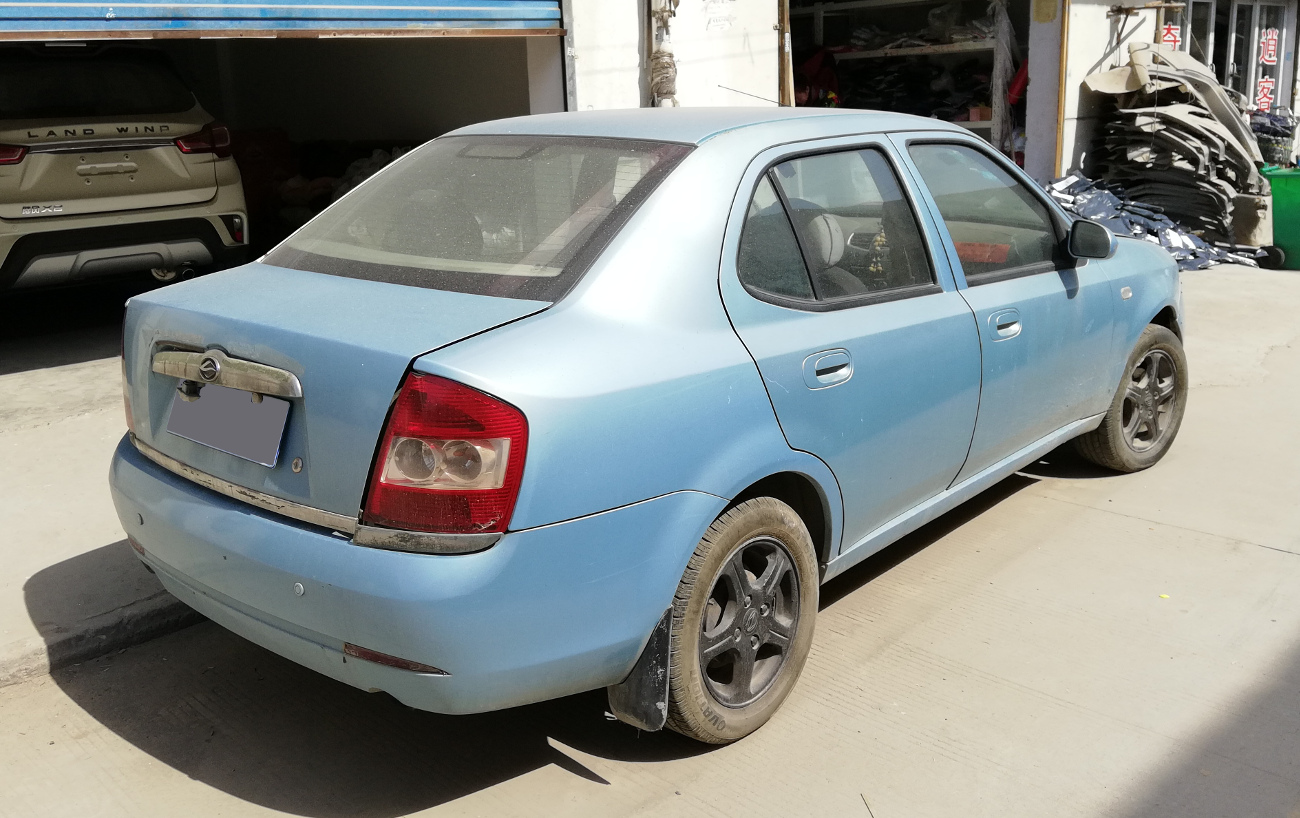
Landwind Forward rear quarter view

The Landwind CV7 originally debuted in October 2007. The design was conducted by Changan Automobile's European design studio, while technical suppliers include EDAG and Forschungsgesellschaft für Energietechnik und Verbrennungsmotoren. The vehicle was criticized for resembling the fourth generation Ford Fiesta sedan as Changan Automobile took advantage of the joint venture with Ford while developing the model.

The Landwind CV7 is powered by a 1.3 liter inline-4 JL474Q8 engine or a 1.5 liter inline-4 SOHC JL475Q8 engine producing 95 PS (70 kW; 94 hp) and 137 N⋅m (101 lb⋅ft) of torque, with a 5-speed manual transmission as the only gearbox option.

=== Landwind CV7 Sport ===
The Landwind CV7 Sport is a sportier variant of the CV7 sedan. The CV7 Sport was revealed during the 2008 Beijing Auto Show featuring a body kit. The engine is the 1.5 liter inline-4 engine producing 95 PS (70 kW; 94 hp) at 5500rpm and torque of 137 N⋅m (101 lb⋅ft) from 3500-4500rpm.
