= Ford Figo =

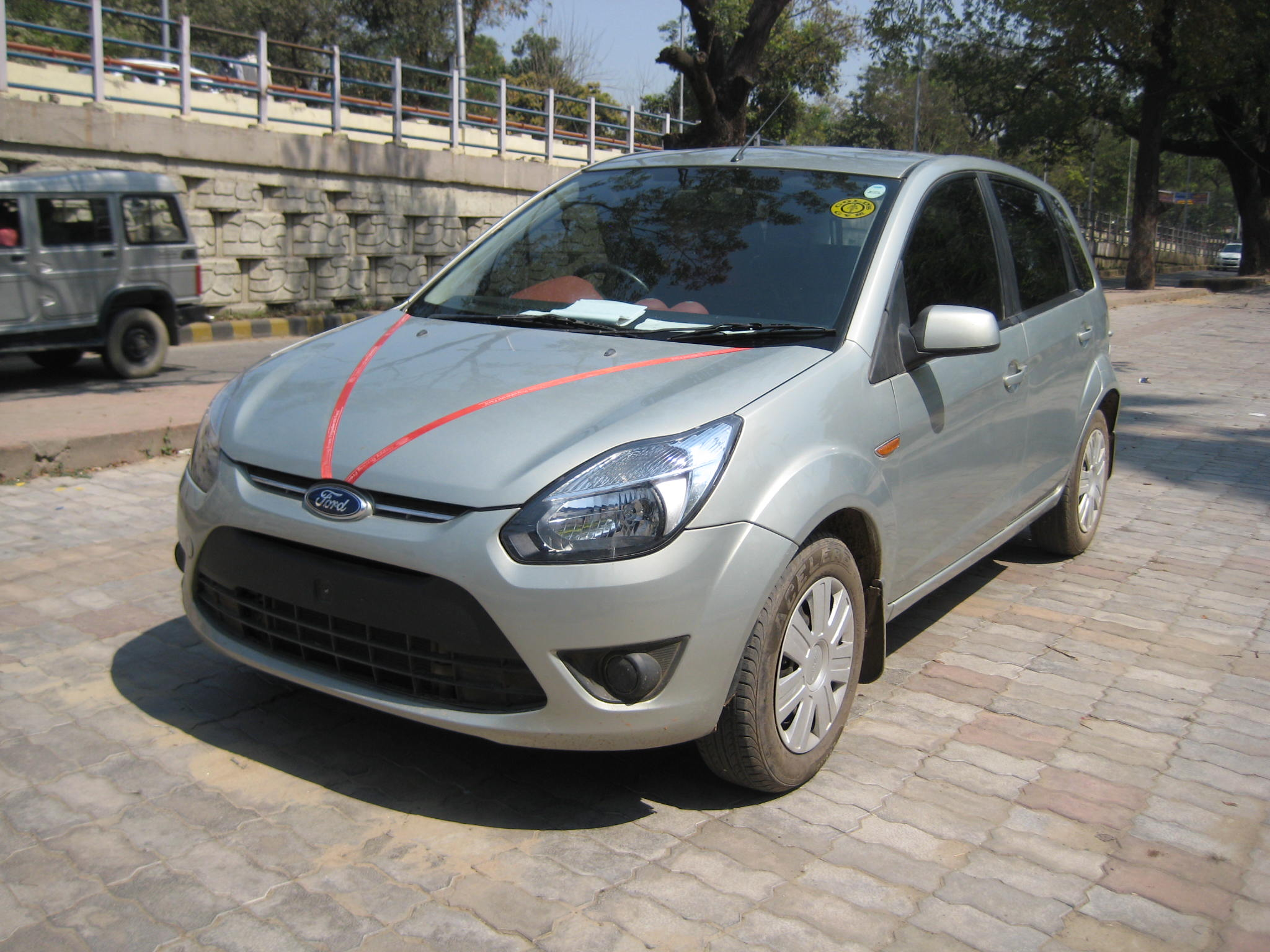

Overview
- Manufacturer: Ford
- Also called: Ford Ka
- Production: March 2010 – 2021

Body and chassis
- Class: Subcompact car
- Body style: 5-door hatchback
- Layout: Front-engine, front-wheel-drive

Chronology
- Predecessor: Ford Fiesta (Mexico); Ford Ikon (India)

The Ford Figo is a subcompact hatchback that was manufactured by Ford India at its Chennai and Sanand plants. Based on the Mark V European Ford Fiesta hatchback, the Figo has been sold in emerging countries between March 2010 and 2021.

== First generation (B517; 2010) ==
First generation (B517)
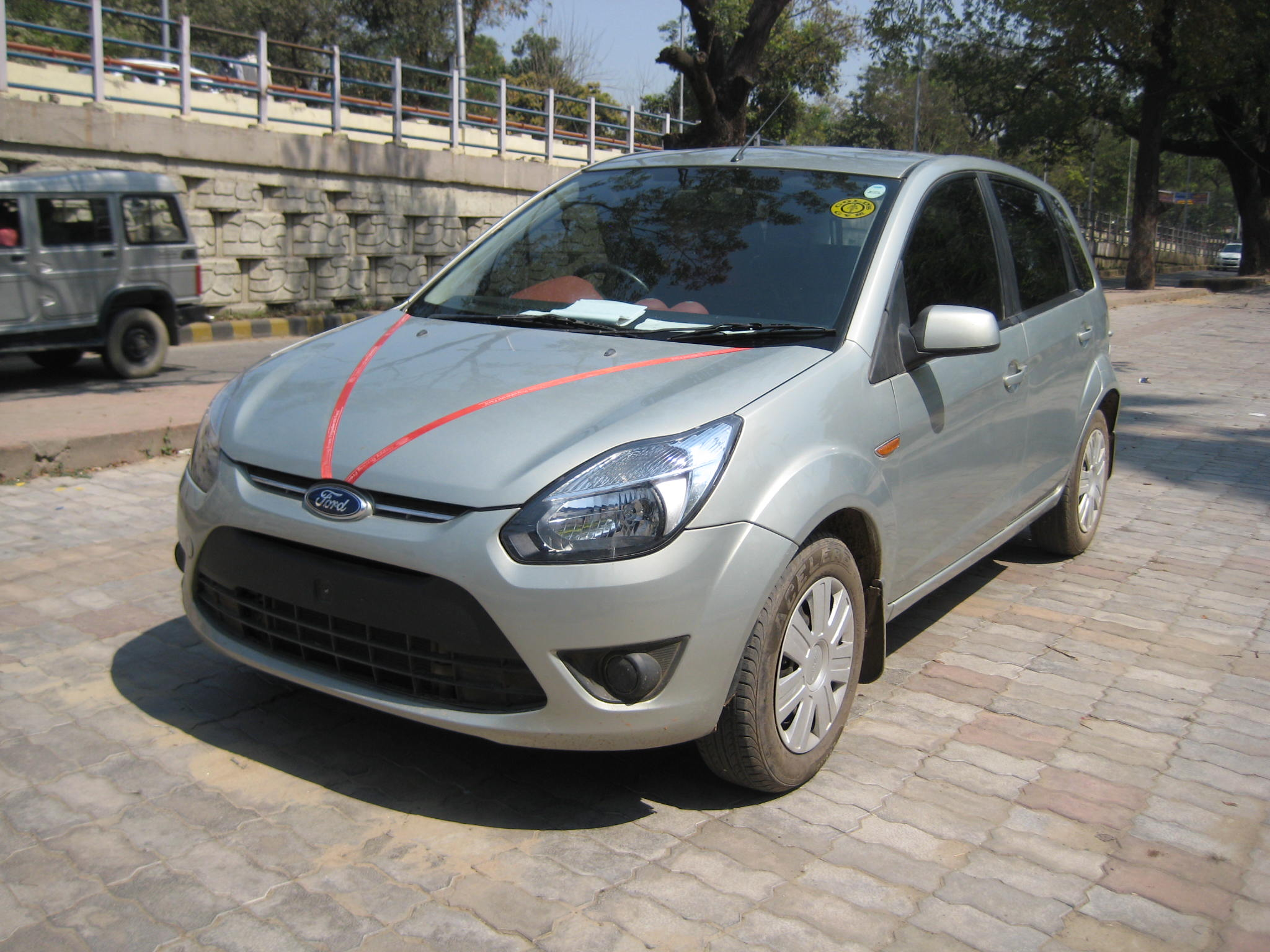

Overview
- Also called: Ford Ikon Hatch (Mexico); Ford Fiesta (MK5)
- Production: March 2010 – 2015
- Assembly: India: Chennai, Tamil Nadu (Ford India)

Body and chassis
- Body style: 5-door hatchback
- Related: Ford Fiesta (fifth generation)

Powertrain
- Engine: 1,242 cc (75.8 cu in) Zetec-SE I4; 1,398 cc (85.3 cu in) Duratorq DLD-414 TDCi I4
- Transmission: 5-speed manual 4-speed automatic

Dimensions
- Wheelbase: 2,489 mm (98.0 in)
- Length: 3,795 mm (149.4 in)
- Width: 1,680 mm (66.1 in)
- Height: 1,427 mm (56.2 in)
- Kerb weight: 1,040–1,130 kg (2,293–2,491 lb)

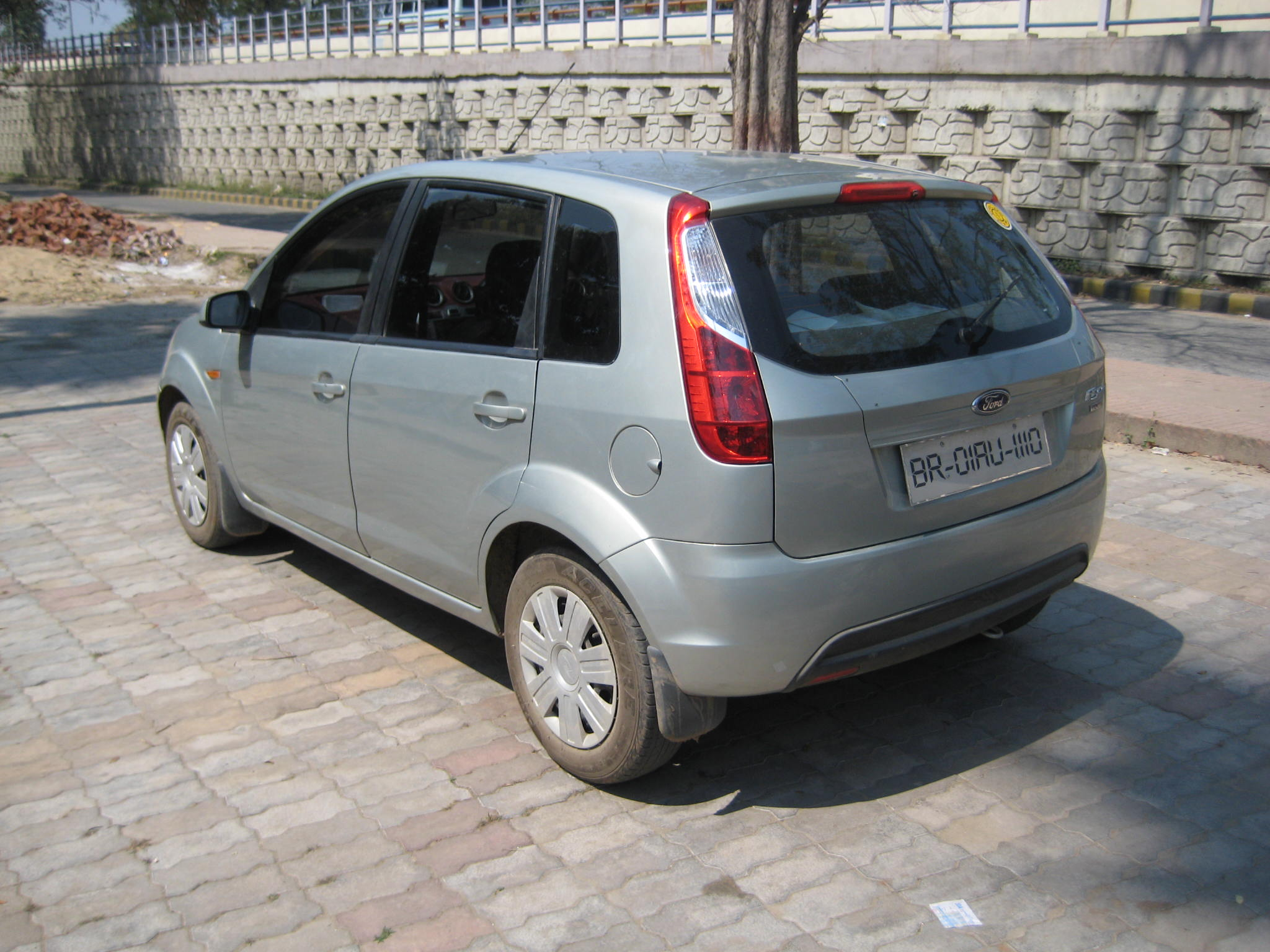
Ford Figo First Generation (2010)

The Ford Figo was unveiled in Delhi in September 2009. It is based on the same body used by the Fiesta Mk5 (B256) but with revised front and rear treatments. It is smaller than the Fiesta Classic which Ford also sells in India. The name "Figo" is a colloquial Italian word meaning "cool".

It was launched to the Indian market in March 2010, and by July 2010 there were 25,000 sales bookings across all variants. A facelifted model of the Figo was launched on 15 October 2012. This model has a larger hexagonal grille and redesigned head and tail lamps. It was released in South Africa in January 2013.

=== Market variations ===
==== India ====
The Ford Figo was available in both petrol and diesel versions, all with 5-speed manual transmissions and power steering as standard. Both engines meet the Bharat Stage - IV emission rules.

Ford Figo 2015

The Figo diesel was equipped with the same 1.4-litre Ford Duratorq engine which powered the Ford Ikon and Ford Fiesta. The Indian petrol version was equipped with the 1.2-litre naturally aspirated Ford Duratec engine. The petrol variant gives a mileage of around 12.5 kmpl in the city while on the highway it offers around 15.5 kmpl. and the diesel returns a mileage of around 16 kmpl in the city while on the highway it delivers a mileage of 19 kmpl.

The Figo was available in a range of specifications including LXI, EXI, ZXI and Titanium. The Titanium model came with alloy wheels, dual air bags and ABS as standard.

The Figo underwent a facelift in October 2012 although the car remains unchanged mechanically and uses the same engines.

==== Mexico ====
The Mexican Ikon Hatch was available only with a 1.6-litre Duratec petrol engine producing 98 hp (73 kW; 98 hp) at 6500 rpm and torque of 142 N⋅m (105 lb⋅ft) at 4000 rpm.

==== Middle East ====
The Figo was available with a 1.4-litre petrol engine with a manual gearbox or a 1.6-litre with a 4-speed automatic transmission, which is same as Ford Focus MKII.

==== South Africa ====
The South African petrol Figo was powered by a 1.4-litre producing 62 kW (84 PS; 83 bhp) at 6000 rpm and torque of 127 N⋅m (13.0 kg⋅m) at 4000 and is available in Ambiente and Trend models.

=== Engines ===
Models	1.2 Duratec Petrol	1.4 Duratorq Diesel	1.4 Duratec Petrol	1.6 Duratec Petrol	1.6 Duratec Petrol
Market	India	India/South Africa	South Africa/Middle East	Mexico	Middle East
Engine
Type	1,196 cc (1.196 L; 73.0 cu in) 16V DOHC	1,399 cc (1.399 L; 85.4 cu in) 8V SOHC	1.4 L Duratec DOHC	1.6 L Duratec DOHC	
Transmission	5-speed manual				4-speed automatic
Power	71 PS (52 kW; 70 hp) at 6250	69 PS (51 kW; 68 hp) at 4000	84 PS (62 kW; 83 hp) at 6000	98 hp (73 kW; 98 hp) at 6500rpm	
Torque	102 N⋅m (75 lb⋅ft) at 4000	160 N⋅m (118 lb⋅ft) at 2000	127 N⋅m (94 lb⋅ft) at 4000	142 N⋅m (105 lb⋅ft) at 4000rpm	
Dimensions
Ground Clearance	168 mm (6.6 in)				
Fuel Tank Capacity	45 L (12 U.S. gal)				
Turning radius	4.9 m (16 ft)				
Boot Space	284 L (10.0 cu ft)				

=== Production ===
The Ford Figo was manufactured at Ford's plant in Chennai, Tamil Nadu, India. The 100,000th Ford Figo produced for the Indian market was delivered 15 months after its launch. The 200,000th Figo was sold during August 2012, after 29 months of production, while the 300,000th Figo was made in first week of August 2013, after 41 months of production.

=== Braking and handling ===
The Ford Figo had ventilated discs at front and drum rear brakes. The top variant came with an Anti-lock braking system (ABS) with Electronic Brakeforce Distribution (EBD) which enhances the safety of the car by helping it stop in emergency situations.

=== Safety ===
Global NCAP 1.0 test results (India) Ford Figo – No Airbags (2014, similar to Latin NCAP 2013)
Test	Score	Stars
Adult occupant protection	0.00/17.00	0 /5 stars
Child occupant protection	20.75/49.00	2 /5 stars

During a crash, the Figo's engine automatically falls from the bonnet area to prevent the car from catching fire. Dual front airbags are available on a premium package.

The Figo for India with no airbags and no ABS received 0 stars for adult occupants and 2 stars for toddlers from Global NCAP 1.0 in 2014 (based on Latin NCAP 2013).

=== Awards ===
The Figo had been awarded 20 Indian automotive industry awards, more honors than any other car in 2010. The Ford Figo was voted the 2011 Indian Car of the Year by a panel of leading automotive magazine editors. It was also named runner-up in the 2011 South African Car of the Year Awards.

=== Marketing controversy ===
A series of Ford Figo print ads were created by JWT India, including a caricature of former Italian Prime Minister Silvio Berlusconi in the driver's seat with three scantily clad women sitting gagged and bound in the trunk, a Paris Hilton caricature winking from the driver's seat while Kim Kardashian and two others are gagged in the boot, and a caricatured Michael Schumacher with Sebastian Vettel, Lewis Hamilton and Fernando Alonso lookalikes gagged in the back. All three featured the same tagline: "Leave your worries behind".

The print ads were not approved by Ford, but were used as speculative renderings to promote the agency. JWT breached trust and used an approval from Ford to use other poster ads made for Ford as a tacit approval to enter the adverts into the GoaFest 2013 Advertising awards and adsoftheworld.com. Ivan Razl of adsoftheworld.com confirmed that the ads were removed according to the rules of the website as the letter was only a generic approval and the said ads were not approved, which was confirmed to him by JWT. After the publication of the ads, Ford responded by stating that the posters were contrary to the standards of professionalism and decency within Ford and its agency partners. JWT India's parent, WPP plc, apologized for the adverts.

After the incident, JWT India chief creative officer and managing partner Bobby Pawar and Blue Hive creative director Vijay Simha Vellanki resigned; and a further ten employees were reported to have been laid off.

== Second generation (B562; 2015) ==
Second generation (B562)
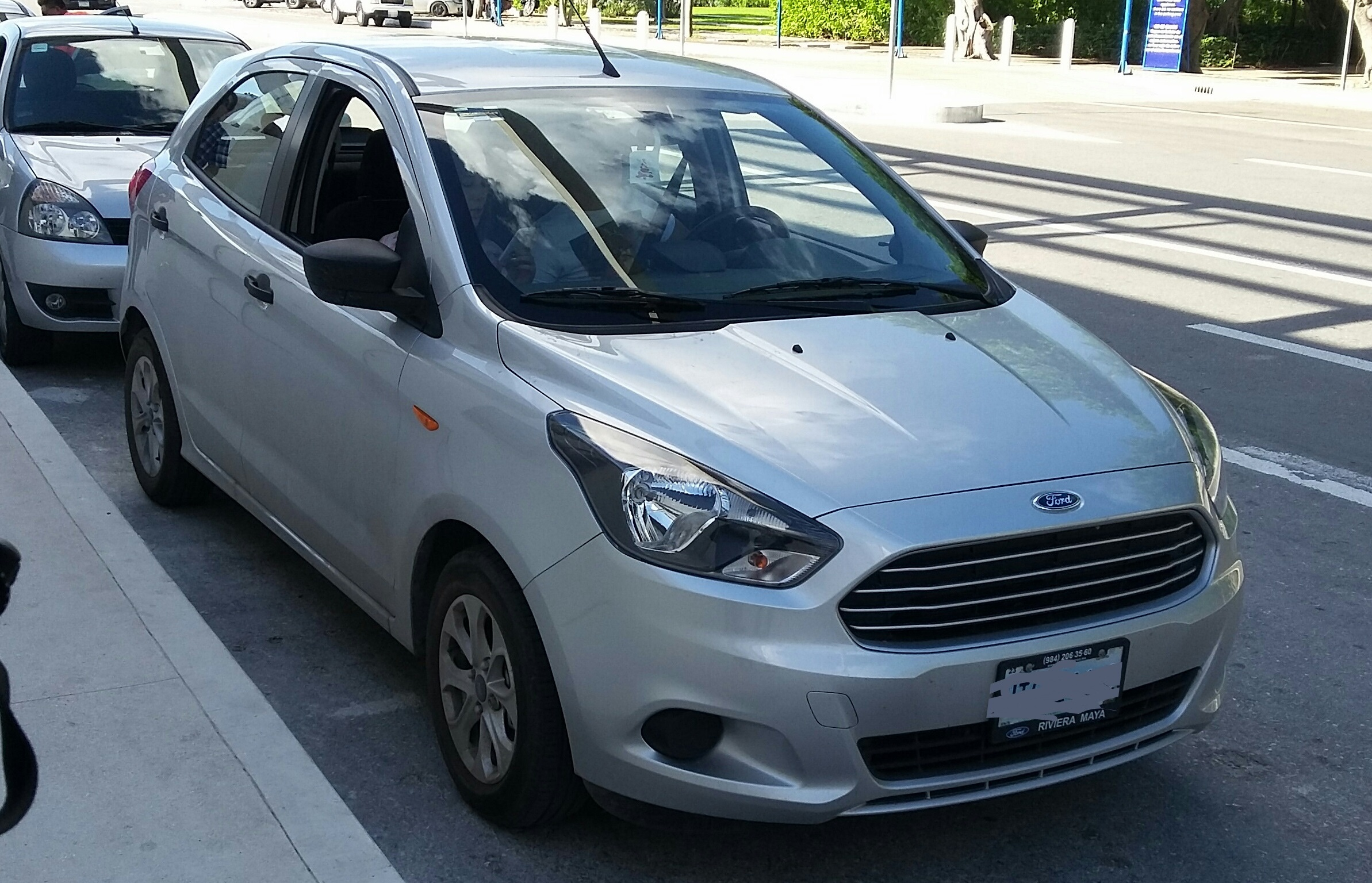

Overview
- Also called: Ford Ka; Ford Ka+ (Europe); Ford Figo Aspire (sedan, India); Ford Freestyle (crossover version, India)
- Production: 2015–2021
- Assembly: India: Sanand, Gujarat (Ford India)

Body and chassis
- Body style: 5-door hatchback 4-door sedan
- Related: Ford Fiesta (sixth generation)

Powertrain
- Engine: 1,499 cc (91.5 cu in) 1.5l Ti-VCT (Petrol); 1,196 cc (73.0 cu in) 1.2l Ti-VCT (Petrol); 1,498 cc (91.4 cu in) 1.5l TDCi (Diesel)
- Transmission: 6-speed dual-clutch automatic mated to 1.5l Ti-VCT (Petrol); 5-speed manual mated to 1.2l Ti-VCT (Petrol) and 1.5l TDCi (Diesel)

Dimensions
- Wheelbase: 2,491 mm (98.1 in)
- Length: 3,886 mm (153.0 in) (hatchback); 3,995 mm (157.3 in) (Aspire); 4,254 mm (167.5 in) (sedan)
- Width: 1,695 mm (66.7 in)
- Height: 1,525 mm (60.0 in)
- Kerb weight: 1,037–1,041 kg (2,286–2,295 lb)

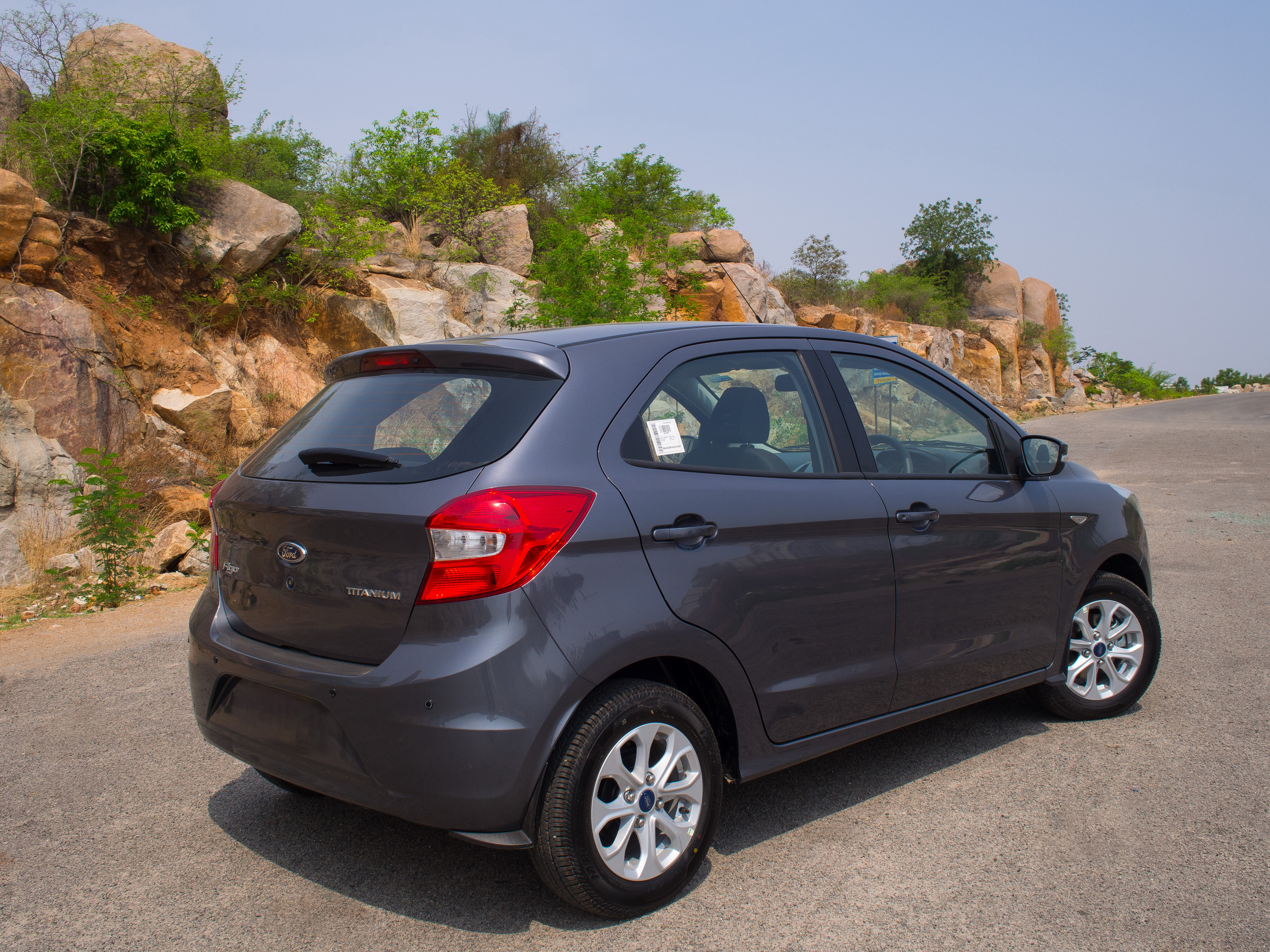
2016 Ford Figo

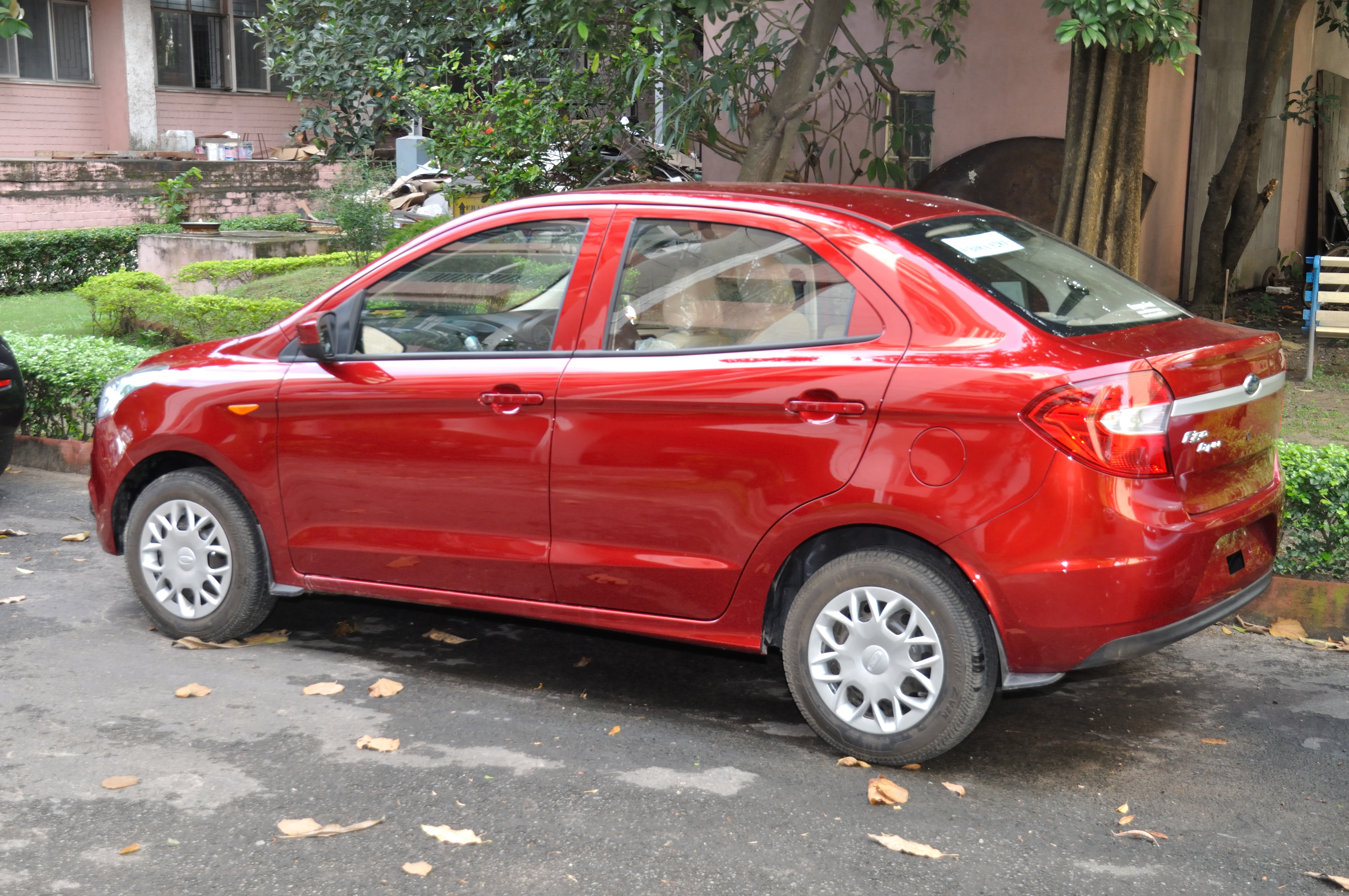
Ford Figo Aspire

Codenamed B562, Ford India launched the second generation Figo in 2015, six years after the initial launch. The second generation Figo came with "Aston Martin-esque" front grilles. On the top end trims Titanium and Titanium+, the slats/bars and the grille surround are chrome plated. The lower trims get either Black or Silver painted grilles and grille surround. The second generation Figo is available in three engine options. The 1.2-litre petrol unit makes 88PS and 112Nm and comes mated to a 5-speed manual transmission. Ford also has a larger 1.5-litre petrol on offer which is only offered with a 6-speed Dual-clutch transmission. This unit makes 112PS and 136Nm. And lastly, there is also a 1.5-litre diesel, churning 100PS and 215 Nm.

A performance oriented Figo S was also available. It includes a stiffer suspension setup, along with a rear sway bar and bigger wheels to improve the dynamic nature of the car.

All variants were offered with dual-front airbags except the base variant, which only has a driver-side airbag. The top-end variant gets six airbags in total.

It is equipped with an independent MacPherson strut with coil spring and anti-roll bar up front work in tandem with semi independent twist beam with twin gas and oil filled shock absorbers at the rear.

Equipment highlights for the Figo included the MyFord Dock, first introduced on the Figo Aspire, which allowed occupants to easily charge their smart-devices and also use the same for navigation.

The model was re-launched in February 2020 to comply with BS6 - Bharat Stage 6 norms, which went into effect in April 2020.

=== Recalls ===
Ford India issued a statement saying that they had initiated a voluntary recall for approximately 42,300 units of the new Figo and the Figo Aspire owing to problems in the Restraint Control Module (RCM).

The software issue on the RCM can result in airbags not deploying in certain collisions. This may lead to loss of life. Ford stated that they will be carrying out software upgrade on the RCM on all affected vehicles across the country, free of cost. The recall applied to Figo and Figo Aspire units manufactured since the launch of both the vehicles until 12 April 2016.

=== Safety ===
==== Global NCAP ====
The Aspire for India with no ABS received 3 stars for adult occupants and 2 stars for toddlers from Global NCAP 1.0 in 2017 (similar to Latin NCAP 2013).

Global NCAP 1.0 test results (India) Ford Aspire (Next Gen Figo) – 2 Airbags (2017, similar to Latin NCAP 2013)
Test	Score	Stars
Adult occupant protection	10.49/17.00	3 /5 stars
Child occupant protection	14.22/49.00	2 /5 stars

==== Latin NCAP ====
The Indian-made Figo in its most basic Latin American market configuration received 4 stars for adult occupants and 4 stars for toddlers from Latin NCAP 2.0 in 2019 (one level above 2010-2015).

Latin NCAP 2.0 test results Ford Figo + 4 Airbags (from 24/08/2018) (2019, based on Euro NCAP 2008)
Test	Points	Stars
Adult occupant:	24.76/34.0	4 /5 stars
Child occupant:	35.35/49.00	4 /5 stars

=== Production ===
Ford India initially targeted 20,000 unit/month of average output for Figo and Figo Aspire from the Sanand, Gujarat plant. However reports indicated that Figo hatchback sales declined by 60 per cent between October 2015 and March 2016, while Figo Aspire sales went down 74 percent from its launch in August 2015 and March 2016. This led to slash in production to 10,800 units a month.

The Figo, along with the Endeavour/Everest and EcoSport, was discontinued due to the Chennai and Sanand plants being closed. The Figo for the Mexican market was on sale until 2021.

=== Freestyle ===
In 2018, a crossover-styled variant of the Figo was introduced, known as the Ford Freestyle. It is slotted between the Figo hatchback and the EcoSport. It is available with a 1.2-litre petrol engine and a 1.5-litre diesel engine. Both engines are mated to a 5-speed manual transmission. It is available in the following trims: Titanium and Titanium+.
