= Ford Ikon =

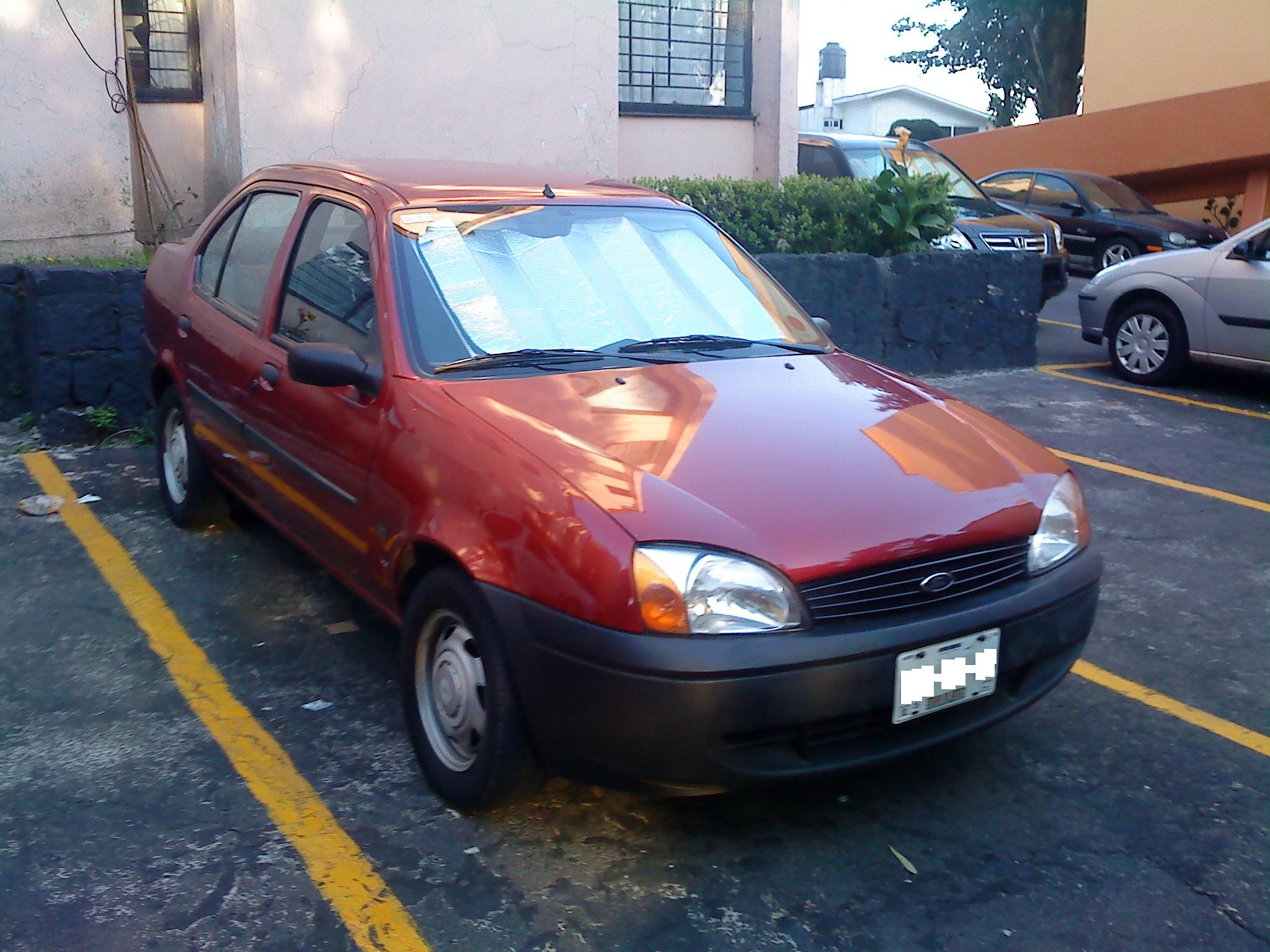

Overview
- Manufacturer: Ford
- Production: 1999–2015

Body and chassis
- Class: Subcompact car
- Layout: Front-engine, front-wheel-drive
- Related: Ford Mondeo; Ford Fiesta

Chronology
- Successor: Ford Figo/Aspire

The Ford Ikon is a subcompact car produced by Ford since the end of 1999. It was initially introduced as the sedan version of the Ford Fiesta hatchback car. It spawned over two generations, the first being based on the fourth generation of the Ford Fiesta and bearing a similar front end design.

The second generation was derived from the fifth generation of the Ford Fiesta into two different sedan models, produced in India and in Brazil, but the Ford Ikon nameplate has only been used for these in South Africa and Mexico, respectively.

Also in Mexico, the nameplate is used for a redesigned hatchback version of the fifth generation of the Ford Fiesta, the Ford Figo, which is imported from India.

== First generation (1999–2011) ==
First generation
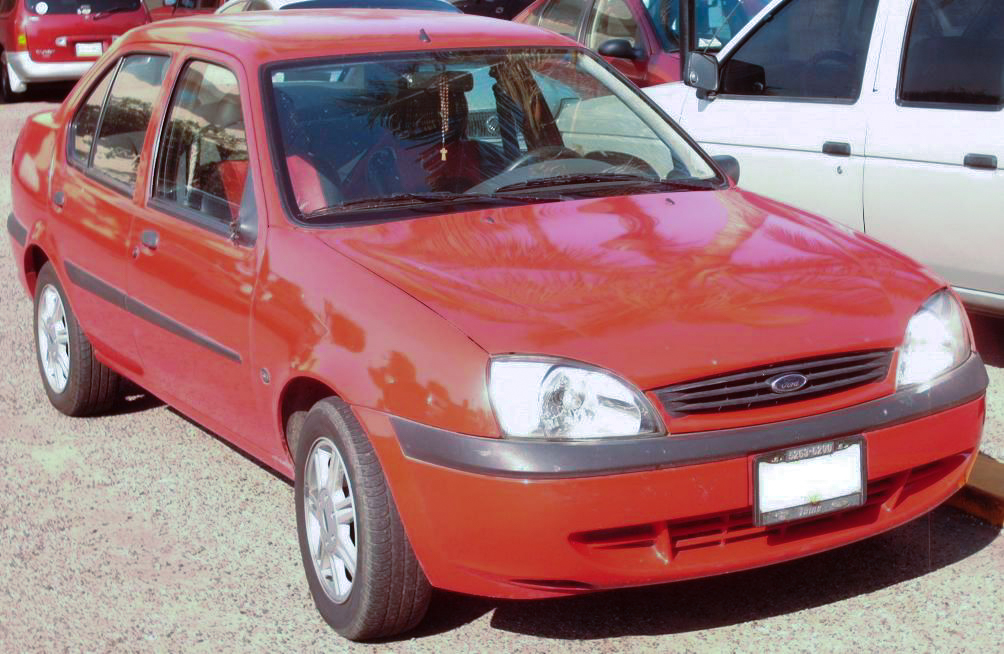

Overview
- Also called: Ford Fiesta Sedan; Ford Fiesta Ikon (Mexico); Ford Fiesta Street (Brazil)
- Production: 1999–2011
- Assembly: India: Chennai (Ford India); China: Chongqing (Changan Ford); South Africa: Pretoria (FMCSA); Mexico: Cuautitlán (Cuautitlán Assembly)

Body and chassis
- Body style: 4-door sedan
- Related: Ford Fiesta IV

Powertrain
- Engine: 1.3 L I4 (petrol); 1.6 L I4 (petrol); 1.4 L I4 (diesel); 1.8 L I4 (diesel)
- Transmission: 5-speed manual 4-speed automatic

Dimensions
- Wheelbase: 2,486 mm (97.9 in)
- Length: 4,140 mm (163.0 in) (pre-facelift); 4,145 mm (163.2 in) (facelift)
- Width: 1,634 mm (64.3 in) (pre-facelift); 1,632 mm (64.3 in) (facelift)

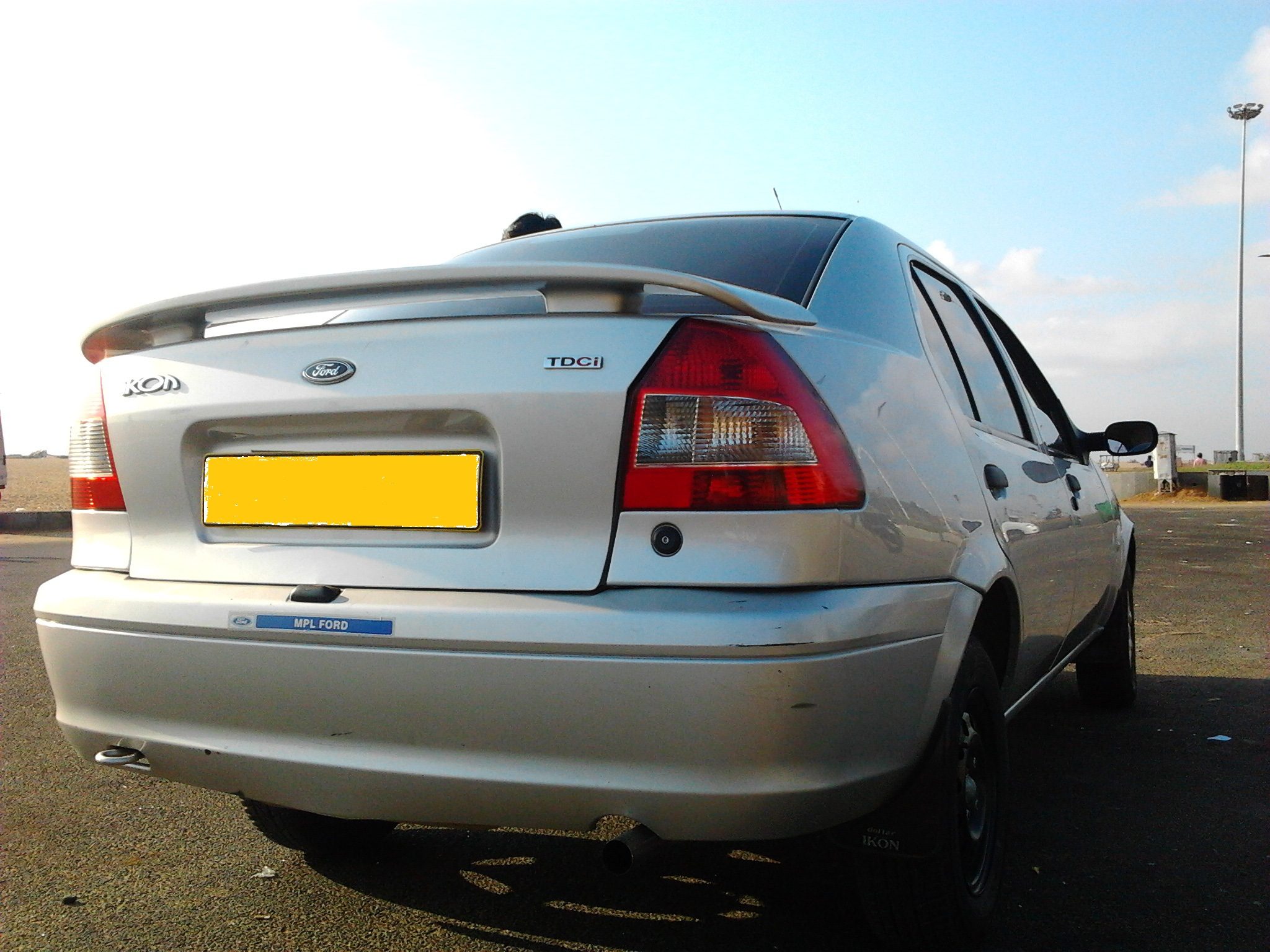
Rear view

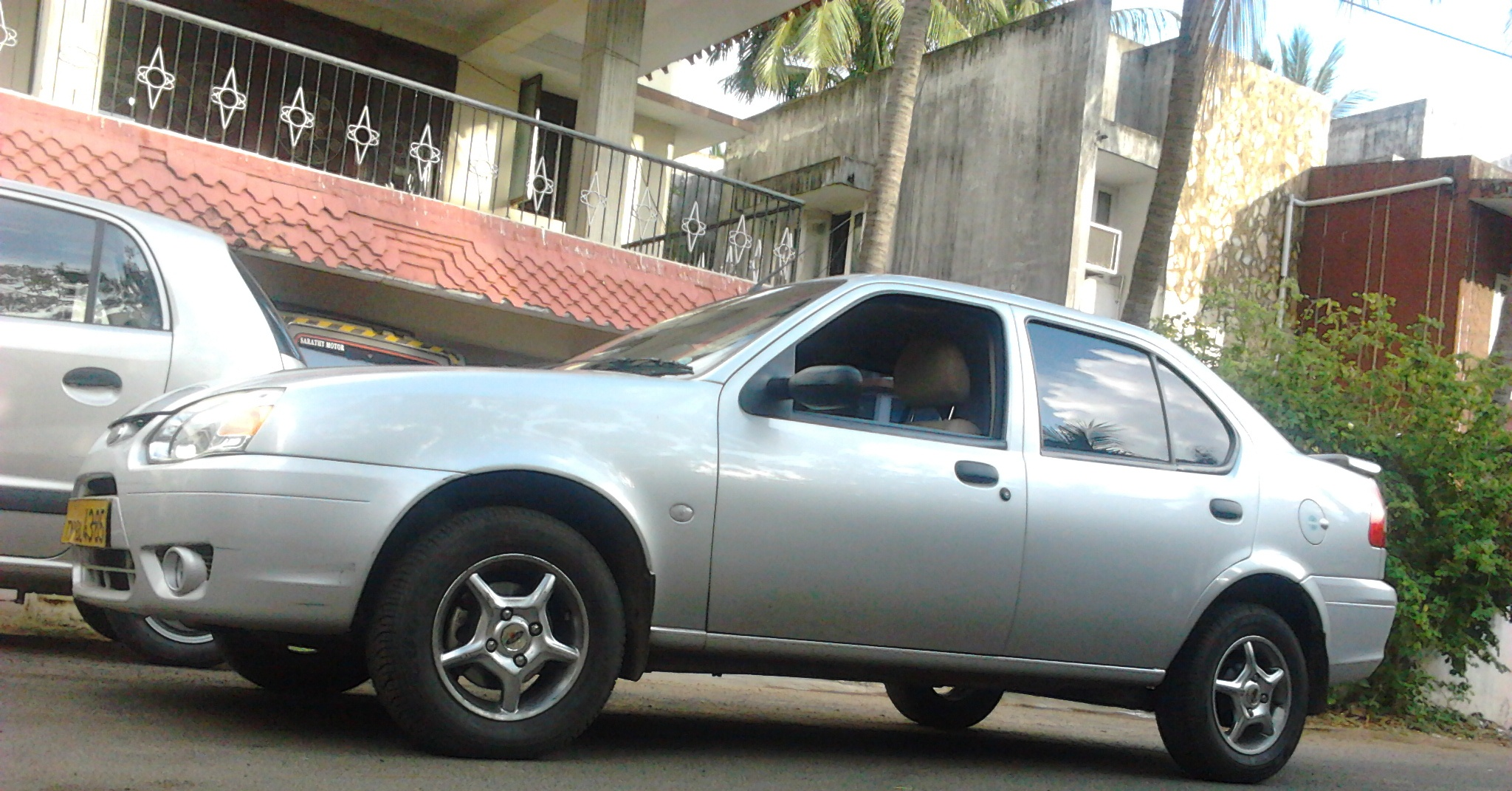
2008 Ford Ikon facelift

The first generation of the Ford Ikon was launched in November 1999, in the Indian capital of New Delhi. It was based on the fourth generation of the Ford Fiesta hatchback, being the four-door sedan version of the latter. Reportedly, it was designed specifically for the Indian market, after the company's officials recognised that a more tailored car could be more successful than the global models in that market. It has been produced at Ford's factory located in Chennai.

It was also marketed in South America and China, where it was known as the Ford Fiesta Sedan. At the beginning of 2001, it also began assembly in South Africa and Mexico. In China, it was assembled starting from 2003, at the Changan Ford factory. In this market, it featured a four-speed automatic transmission, as well as other features such as ABS with electronic brake force distribution, CD player and changer, electric mirrors, remote central locking, antitheft alarm, and front airbags.

It was powered by a 1.3-litre petrol engine, with a single overhead camshaft and electronic fuel injection that was capable of generating 69 hp (51 kW).

Additional 1.6-litre petrol, and 1.8-litre diesel variants were launched at the end of 2002 and during 2003, respectively.

The better-equipped version Flair featured power steering, electric windows, air conditioning, central locking, tachometer, side-impact beams, and new jeans blue color option.

A seven-seater Ikon Estate started development in late 1998, and a model was presented in March 1999. However, the packaging restrictions caused unfavourable proportions that the designers struggled to circumvent, and the project was cancelled soon after.

=== Facelift ===
In November 2008, it was facelifted and received a new diesel engine, from the Duratorq engine family, featuring common-rail injection. It complemented the 1.3-litre petrol unit, and was able to deliver 68 hp (51 kW) and 160 N⋅m (120 lb⋅ft) of torque.

Among the features of this model were a CD/MP3 player, redesigned seat covers, rear spoiler, alloy wheels, remote-controlled central locking, a new instrument cluster with LCD odometer display, and internally adjustable door mirrors. At the exterior, it featured new redesigned headlamps, clear taillamps, and no moldings on the doors. The boot had a capacity of 400 litres (14 cu ft).

It was retired from production in early 2011, following the launch of the sixth generation of the Ford Fiesta in India. The Ford Fiesta Classic (the fifth generation Fiesta in saloon form, sold in India since 2005) effectively took the place of the Ikon in the market.

== Second generation (2007–2015) ==
The following fifth generation of the Ford Fiesta spawned into two models with a sedan body style, one in India and one in Brazil. They were both marketed under the Ford Fiesta nameplate in their countries of origin, but in some particular markets, they were exported as the new Ford Ikon (namely in South Africa and Mexico). Furthermore, a redesigned hatchback version of the same generation of the Ford Fiesta, produced in India and marketed as the Ford Figo, is also exported as the Ford Ikon in Mexico.

=== India and South Africa ===
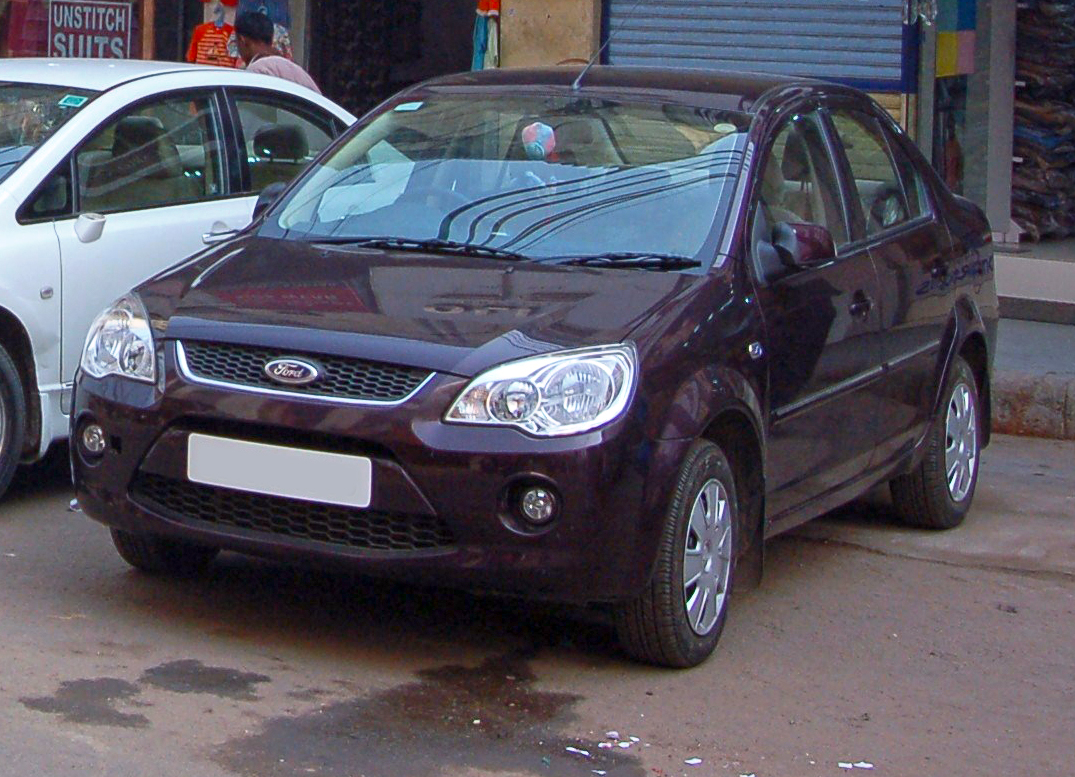
2009 Ford Ikon (India). The model marketed in South Africa bears identical design.

In India, the new generation Ford Fiesta was launched in October 2005. This model was available only as a sedan and featured a different exterior design than the model released in Europe, but had a relatively similar interior.

This same model was released in South Africa as the new Ford Ikon in September 2007. It was powered by either a 1.4- or 1.6-litre petrol engine, both with double overhead camshaft and four valves per cylinder, or by a 1.4-litre common-rail turbodiesel engine. All three engines were coupled to a five-speed manual gearbox.

The car was facelifted in June 2008, the modification being adopted in South Africa in February 2009. It received a revised front end (pictured), new 15-inch alloy wheels, and new interior and trim specifications.

Its dimensions are: 2,486 mm (97.9 in) wheelbase, 4,282 mm (168.6 in) length, 1,686 mm (66.4 in) width, 1,458 mm (57.4 in) height. The boot capacity has been increased to 430 litres (15 cu ft).

=== Brazil and Mexico ===
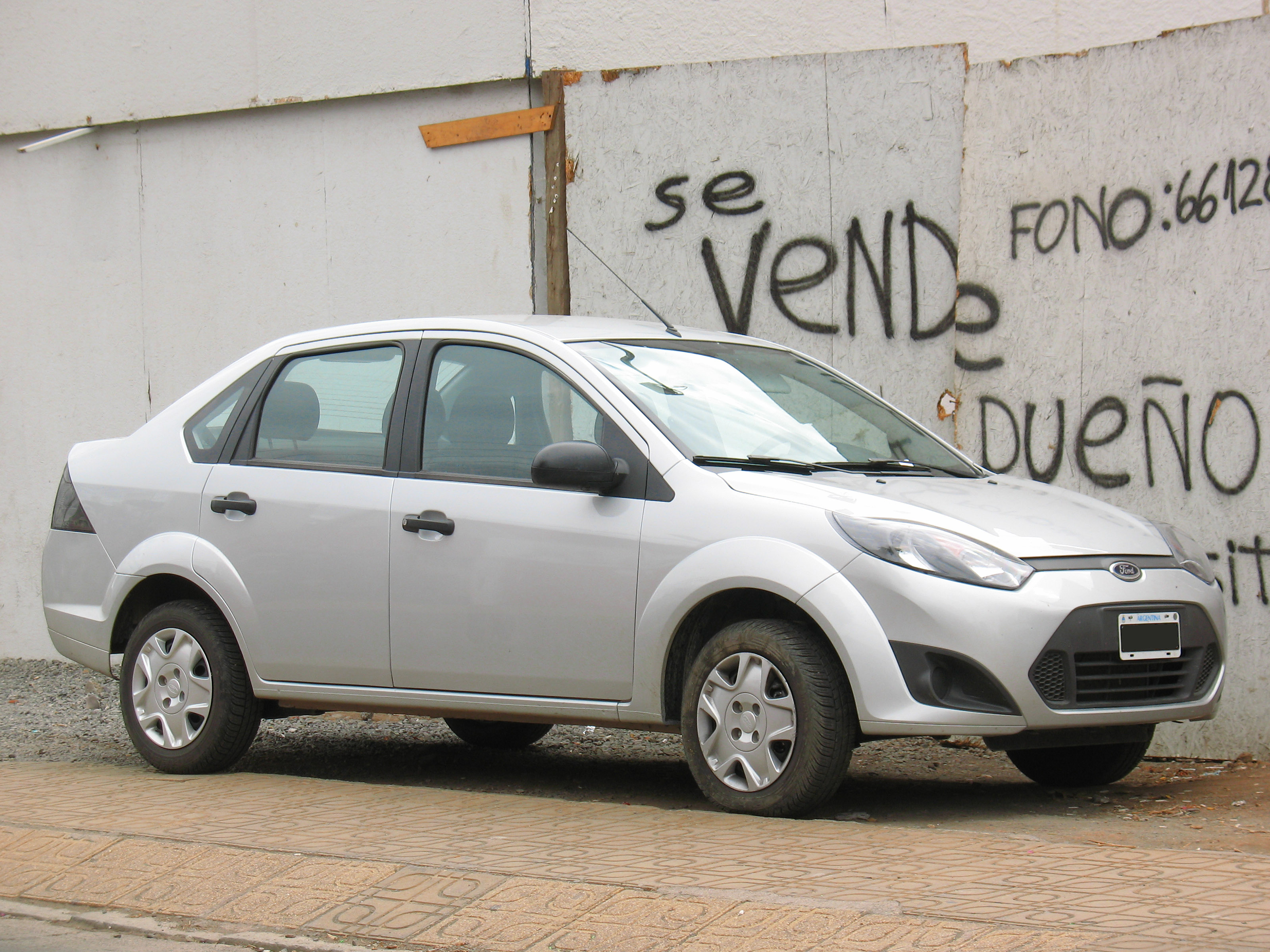
2011 Ford Fiesta Max (Argentina)

In Brazil, the sedan version of the fifth-generation Ford Fiesta was introduced in September 2004, being also marketed throughout the rest of Latin America (including Mexico). This model featured the same front-end design as the model released in Europe. Unlike other countries, the Ikon was marketed in South America as the Fiesta Sedan. It was facelifted in January 2007, and again in April 2010.

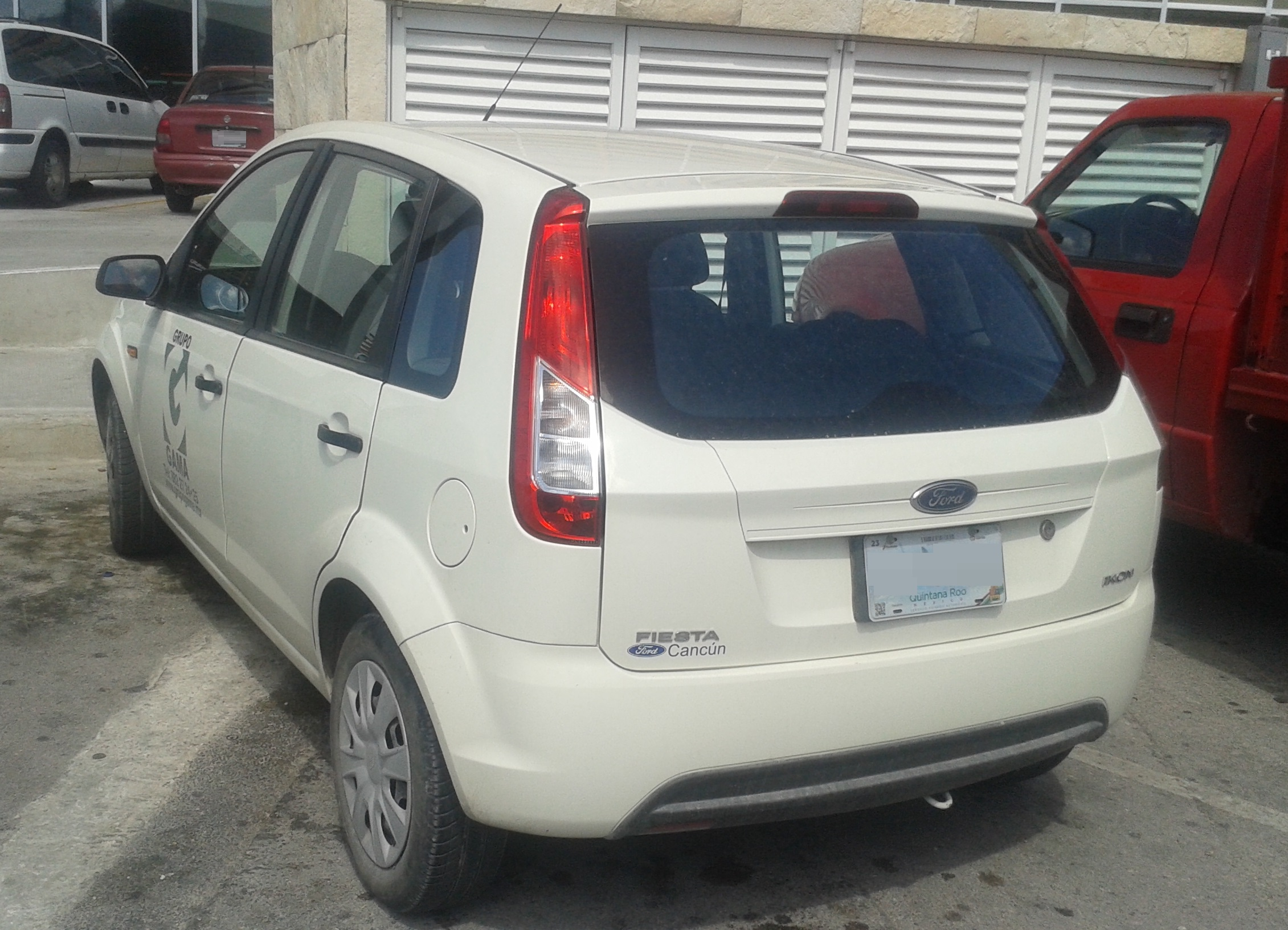
2011 Ford Fiesta Ikon Hatch (Mexico)

This second facelift was introduced in Mexico as the new Ford Ikon during the same year. It was followed by a hatchback version, marketed as the Ikon Hatch, that was released one year later. The latter has a different front-end design from the sedan, and is imported from India, where it is known as the Ford Figo. It is also a redesigned version of the fifth generation of the Ford Fiesta. The sedan version was subsequently retired from the range in Mexico in February 2012.

The sedan model was powered by a 1.6-litre petrol engine with a single overhead camshaft, coupled to a five-speed manual transmission, that had a maximum power output of 95 hp (71 kW). The hatchback version has a 1.6-litre Duratec petrol engine with a double overhead camshaft, that develops a maximum power of 98 hp (73 kW).

Its dimensions are: 2,488 mm (98.0 in) wheelbase, 4,227 mm (166.4 in) length, 1,683 mm (66.3 in) width, 1,487 mm (58.5 in) height. The boot capacity is 482 litres (17.0 cu ft).
