= Ford India =

Indian subsidiary of Ford

Ford India Private Limited
- Type: Subsidiary
- Industry: Automotive
- Founded: October 1995 (as Mahindra Ford India Limited)
- Defunct: 2021
- Fate: Financial Losses and Plant Underutilization
- Headquarters: Sholinganallur, Chennai, Tamil Nadu
- Key people: Anurag Mehrotra (final Managing Director in 2021)
- Products: Automobiles
- Number of employees: 10,000 (2021)
- Parent: Ford Motor Company
- Website: india.ford.com

Ford India Private Limited is a subsidiary of Ford Motor Company for its operations in India. Its headquarters is located in Sholinganallur, Chennai, Tamil Nadu. Ford also had operated integrated manufacturing facilities in Sanand, Gujarat. On September 9, 2021, Ford exited the Indian market as it failed to keep up with the competition, and other global economic factors had led to reduction in demand. On 8 August 2022, Ford announced it would be selling its manufacturing plant in the western state of Gujarat for INR 7.26 billion (approximately US$91.5 million) to Tata Motors. Since 2021, Ford India has focused on the businesses of supporting a service network, import and distribution of automotive parts, and the sale of extended warranties.

Ford India leased back some of its former facilities in Gujarat from Tata Motors for the purpose of manufacturing engines for some export markets. Its engine manufacturing operations continue as of 2025 to a limited extent. Ford India still owns the closed Chennai plant, and is determining its future plans, to be revealed in 2025-26.

== History ==
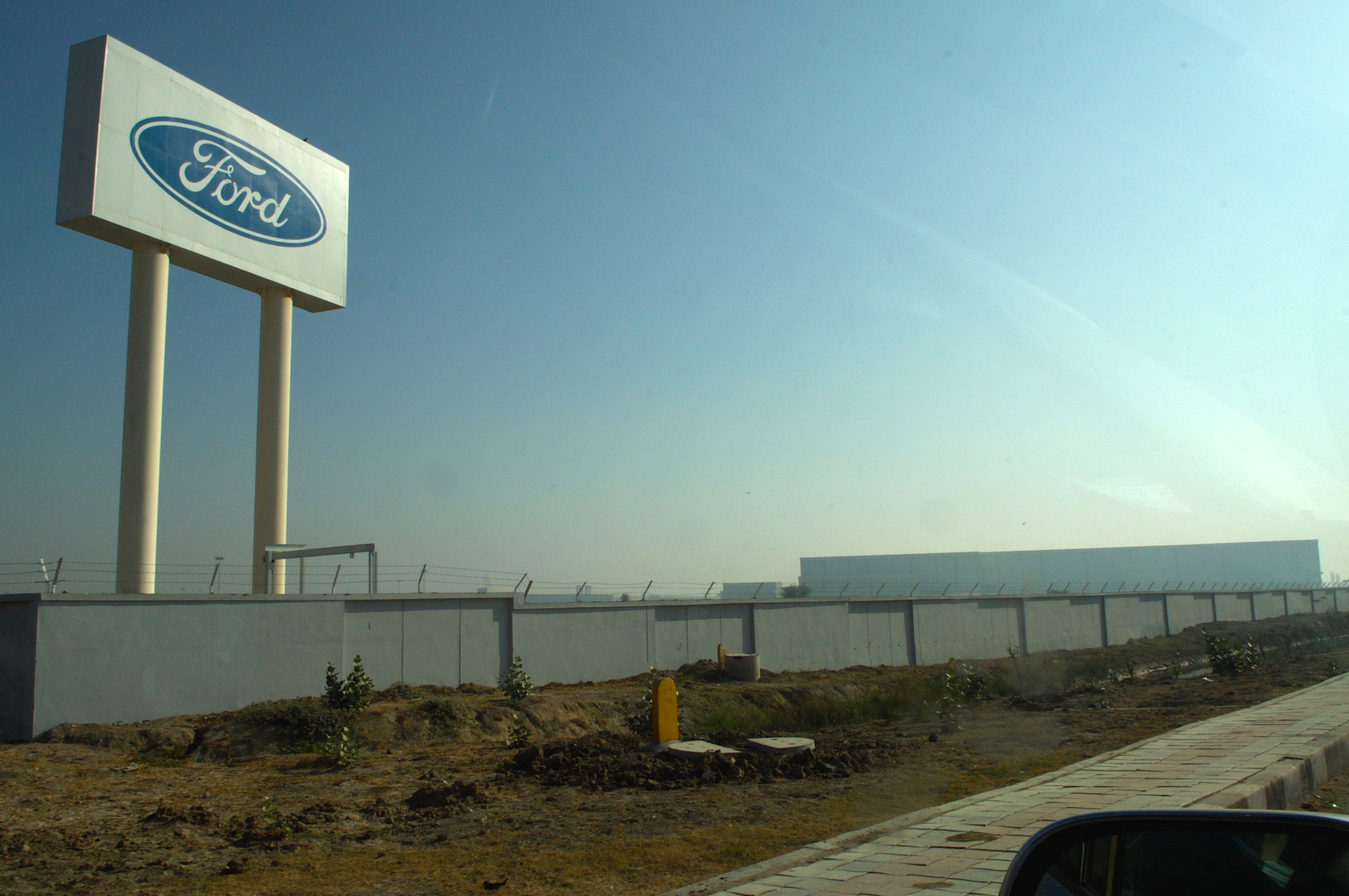
Ford Motor Co. Factory in India.

Ford India Private Limited began production in 1926 as a subsidiary of the Ford Motor Company of Canada. The initial Ford India company was liquidated in May 1953 as a result of severe import restrictions having been enacted. Ford re-entered the Indian market in October 1995 as Mahindra Ford India Limited (MFIL), a 50-50 joint venture with Mahindra & Mahindra Limited. Ford increased its interest to 72% in March 1998 and renamed the company Ford India Private Limited. The total investments made by Ford Motor Company since it set shop in 1995 stands at $2 billion as of April 2012.

Ford launched several models in India, including the sixth generation European Ford Escort and the Ford Ikon, later followed by the Ford Mondeo (second generation). In 2003 Ford launched its first SUV - Endeavour. The first-generation Endeavour is based on the Mazda-based Ford Ranger pickup truck, while the second-generation model is based on the globally-marketed T6 Ranger. In late 2004 Ford launched the European Ford Fusion, which brought a totally new segment to India - the crossover which the company called as an Urban Activity Vehicle & marketed in India as The-No-Nonsense-Car; going by its name, it was a very practical car way ahead of its time, and was popular mostly among enthusiasts.

Ford launched the Ford Fiesta in its sedan guise which was widely received in the market and was a sales success. Ford also launched the Ford Figo, based on the sixth generation Ford Fiesta hatchback in the Indian market.

With the Ford EcoSport crossover, Ford became one of the first companies to exploit the Indian government's policy of lower taxes for sub 4-metre automobiles. Ford also exports the EcoSport from India to EU and US markets. Ford then launched the second generation Ford Figo, first in its sedan guise as the Ford Figo Aspire, which now remains Ford's only sedan in the Indian market after discontinuation of the sixth generation Ford Fiesta. The Figo hatchback was launched at a later date. To fill the gap between the Figo and the EcoSport, the company launched the Ford Freestyle in 2018; this is essentially a crossover version of the face-lifted Ford Figo hatchback.

In 2019, the company started talks with Mahindra & Mahindra to establish a new joint venture, but as of April 2021, those plans had been cancelled.

In September 2021, the company announced its intent to end all domestic manufacturing in India. In December 2021 Kotak Mahindra Bank's finance unit Kotak Mahindra Prime purchased Ford Credit India's vehicle finance portfolio.

== Manufacturing facilities ==
Ford India's main manufacturing plant located in Maraimalai Nagar, 45 kilometres (28 miles) from Chennai has a capacity to produce 150,000 cars on a two-shift basis and 200,000 with three shifts. In 2010–11, the company's yearly production crossed the 100,000 mark.

As its new hatchback Figo was launched in March 2010, Ford Motor Company invested $500 million to double capacity of the plant to 200,000 vehicles annually and setting up a facility to make 250,000 engines annually. The engine plant opened for operations in January 2010. In 2012, the company invested a further $72 million to raise engine production capacity to 330,000 units.

The company rolled out the Ford EcoSport in June 2013 with a $142 million investment. With the Ford EcoSport, the Chennai plant will ramp up to a capacity of 200,000 units.

As part of its plan to launch 8 new vehicles by 2015, the car maker announced an intended investment of $1 billion for a new state-of-the-art manufacturing plant at Sanand, Gujarat on a 460-acre site. Installed manufacturing capacity was announced at 270,000 engines and 240,000 vehicles a year. The plant commenced production in 2014. Once the plant was fully operational, Ford India estimated it would have a cumulative capacity to make 440,000 cars and 610,000 engines annually. In May 2022, Tata Motors announced that it has signed an agreement to acquire a plant.

In September 2021, the company announced it would cease production in India, citing growing losses and no sustainable path to profitability in the territory.

In February 2022, Ford decided to returning to the Indian market as an electric vehicle maker, but in May 2022 plans were scrapped indefinitely of this decision.

After Ford's Chennai plant was closed, the workers union and Ford India negotiated for a severance package, in September 2022, Ford India presented its final severance package offer to the worker's union.

== Models ==
=== Discontinued ===
Model	Released	Discontinued	Image	Notes
Escort	1996	1999		
Ikon	1999	2011		
Mondeo	2001	2007		Imported
Endeavour	2003	2021		
Fusion	2004	2010		
Fiesta/Classic	2005	2015		
Figo	2010	2021		
Global Fiesta	2011	2015		
EcoSport	2013	2021		
Figo Aspire	2015	2021		
Mustang	2016	2021		Imported
Freestyle	2018	2021		

== Sales and service network ==
As of April 2016, Ford has more than 376 sales and service outlets in 209 cities across India.

== Sales performance ==
In the year 2010, FIPL recorded sales of 83,887 vehicles against 29,488 vehicles sold during the year 2009 and registered a sales growth of 172%.

Calendar Year	Sales	Market Share
2010	83887	*
2011	96354	3.9%
2012	87600	3.32%
2013	80447	3.29%
2014	77157	3.06%
2015	77809	2.84%
2016	86607	2.95%
2017	87588	2.74%
2018	97804	2.92%
2019	73636	2.50%
2020	66415	2.39%

== Exports ==
Ford India exported 40 percent of its engine production and 25 percent of its car production to 35 countries. Some of them are: United States, Canada, Mexico, Saudi Arabia, South Africa, Nepal, Kenya, Bahrain, Angola, Bermuda, Ghana, Iraq, Liberia, Lebanon, Malawi, Madagascar, Mauritius, Nigeria, Senegal, Tanzania, UAE, Zambia and Zimbabwe.

== Corporate social responsibility ==
Ford India's CSR activities are focused primarily in four key areas: road safety, education, healthcare, and environment.
