= Ford EcoSport =

Subcompact crossover SUV by Ford, 2003–2022

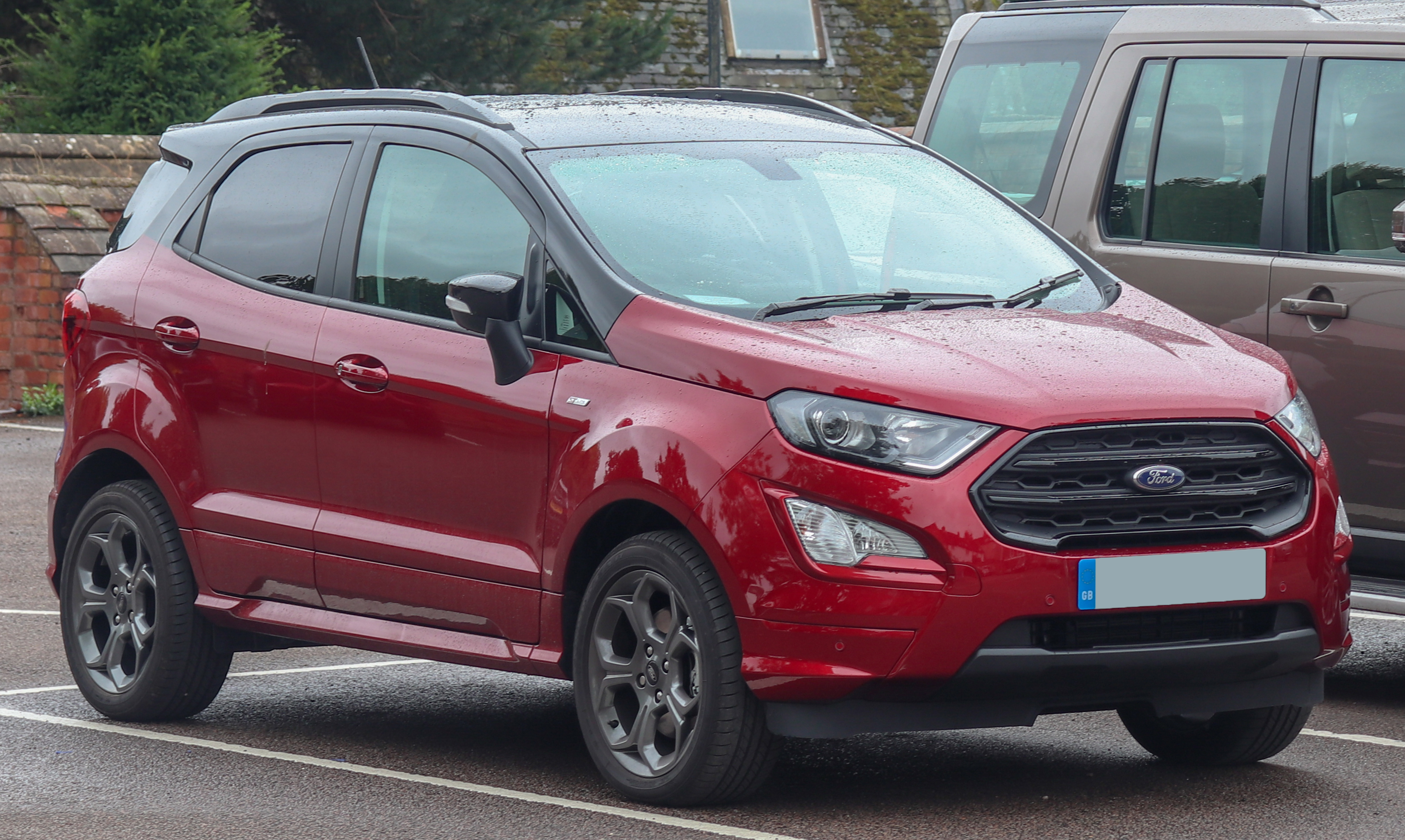

Overview
- Manufacturer: Ford
- Production: 2003–2022
- Model years: 2014–2022 (Europe); 2018–2022 (North America)

Body and chassis
- Class: Subcompact crossover SUV (B)
- Body style: 5-door SUV
- Layout: Front-engine, front-wheel-drive or all-wheel-drive

The Ford EcoSport (/ˈɛkoʊspɔːrt/ EK-oh-sport) is a subcompact crossover SUV (B-segment) manufactured by Ford between 2003 and 2022.

The first-generation model was developed and built in Brazil by Ford Brazil since 2003, at the Camaçari plant. The second-generation model was launched in 2012, which was assembled in factories in India, Thailand, Russia and Romania. The vehicle entered the European market in 2014 and the North American market in 2018. It was sold in both until its discontinuation after the 2022 model year. Throughout its existence, the EcoSport shared its platform with the Fiesta.

== First generation (BV226; 2003) ==
First generation
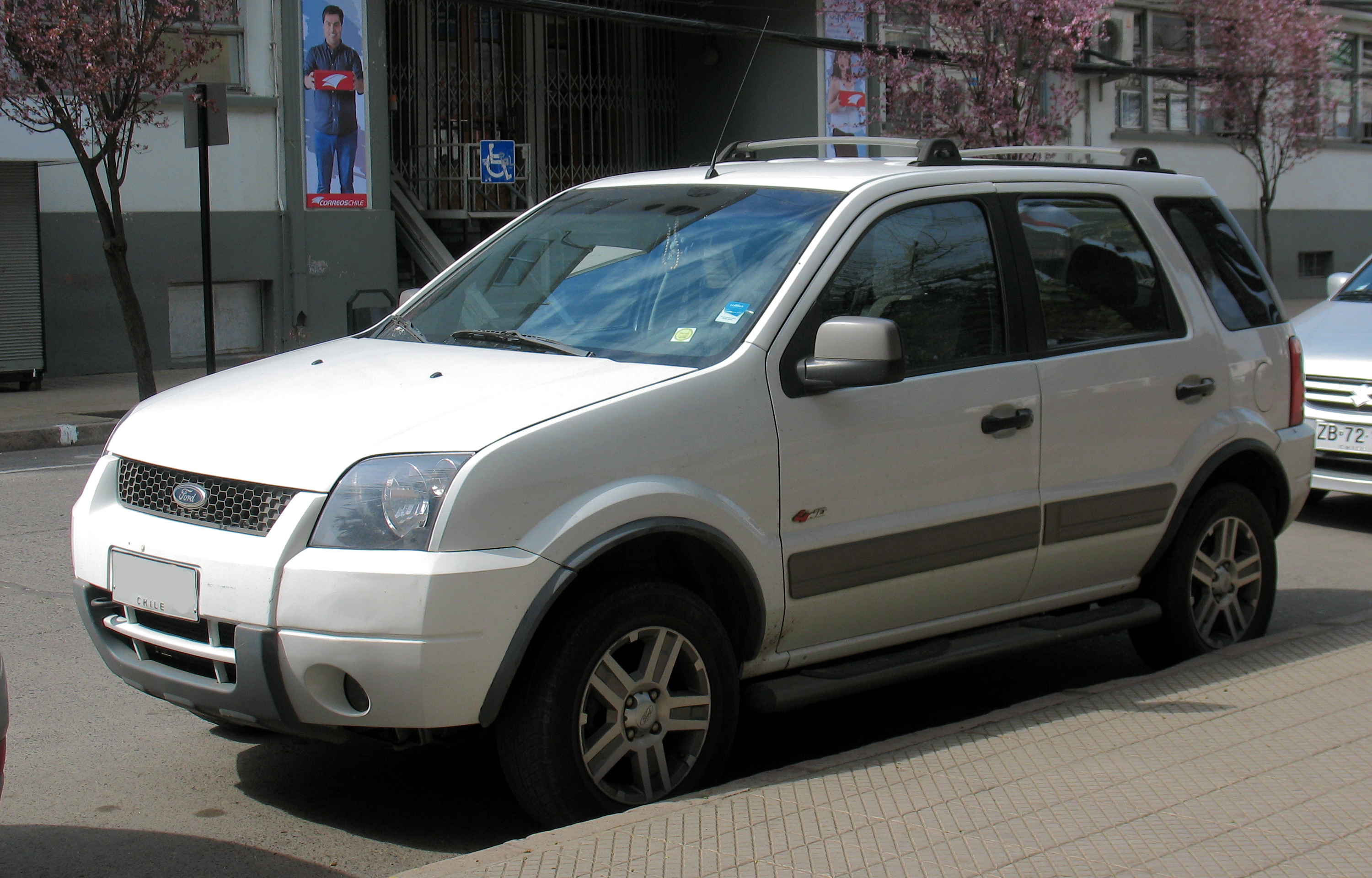

Overview
- Model code: BV226
- Production: 2003–2012
- Assembly: Brazil: Camaçari (Ford Brazil)

Body and chassis
- Platform: Ford B3 platform
- Related: Ford Fiesta (fifth generation); Ford Fusion (Europe)

Powertrain
- Engine: Petrol: 1.0 L Zetec-Rocam SC I4; 1.6 L Zetec-Rocam I4; 2.0 L Duratec I4; Diesel: 1.4 L Duratorq I4
- Transmission: 5/6-speed manual 4-speed automatic

Dimensions
- Wheelbase: 2,490 mm (98.0 in)
- Length: 4,228 mm (166.5 in)
- Width: 1,980 mm (78.0 in) (with mirrors)
- Height: 1,679 mm (66.1 in)

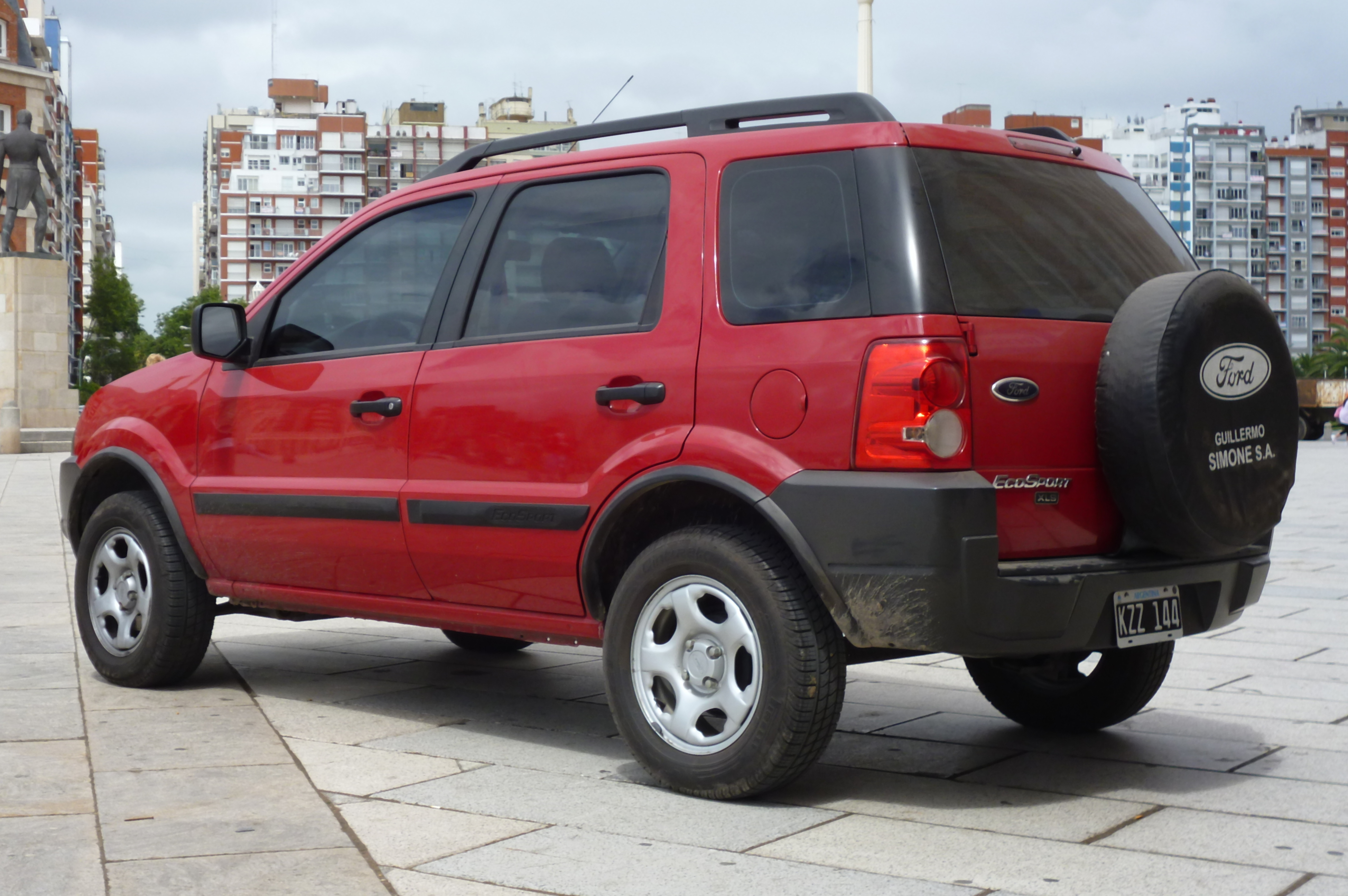
Rear view (1st generation)

The first generation EcoSport was designed by Ford Brazil Development Center under the program code BV226, and the codename "Amazon Project". It is based on the European Fiesta and Fusion MPV, sharing the same Ford B3 platform.

The EcoSport became one of Ford's best-seller models in Brazil, consistently appearing on the twenty best selling vehicles. It was also popular in Argentina, Venezuela, and Mexico. Its main competitors were the Fiat Palio Adventure and Volkswagen CrossFox. In 2011, cumulative sales reached 700,000.

=== Versions and engines ===
The EcoSport was available with five straight-four engines:

- Zetec-Rocam 1.0 L gasoline 8v supercharged, 70 kW (95 PS) (discontinued in 2006)
- Zetec-Rocam 1.6 8v gasoline/ethanol, 82 kW (111 PS)
- Duratec 2.0 L gasoline 16v 107 kW (145 PS)
- Duratorq 1.4 L TDCi Diesel, 50 kW (68 PS) (export only)

All models have front-wheel drive with manual transmission as standard. The 2.0 L model can also receive a four speed automatic transmission (FWD only) or four-wheel drive (manual six speed only).

The 4WD version used Control Trac II, a traction system originally developed by Mazda that at the time equipped the Mazda Tribute and the Ford Escape. It used an E-RBC torque converter to distribute torque to the rear axle when a difference in rotational speed between the front and rear wheels was detected. The system could also be manually engaged via a button on the dashboard; in this mode, torque was distributed 60% to the front and 40% to the rear. In extreme situations, when the front wheels lost grip entirely, up to 100% of the torque could be transferred to the rear axle. The 4WD version was equipped with the G5MX transmission and a multilink rear suspension, while all two-wheel-drive EcoSport models used a rear torsion beam suspension. The weight increase compared to the 2WD version was approximately 140 kg. The front suspension received minor reinforcements but remained the same MacPherson strut system used in the standard version. The driveshaft was installed inside the central tunnel, occupying the space normally used by the exhaust system in the standard model. As a result, the exhaust was relocated to the right side, and the fuel tank was redesigned, increasing its capacity by 5 liters, for a total of 50 liters.

=== Restyling ===
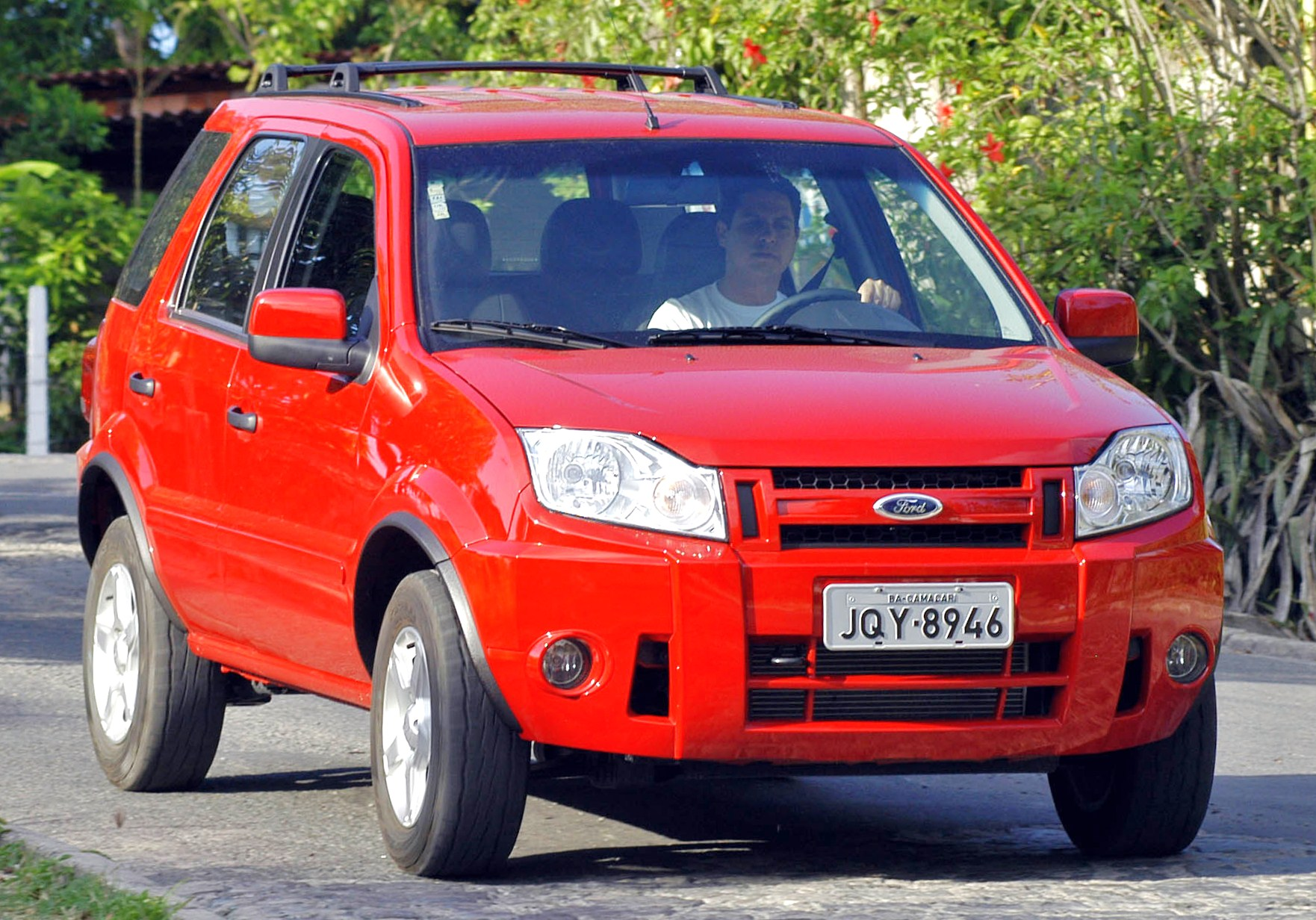
Mid-cycle facelift

At the end of 2007, a mid-cycle restyling was introduced, which renewed completely the front to bring it closer to then current Ford pickups, as well as the contemporary Brazilian restyling of the Ford Fiesta. Also updated were the rear lights, both bumpers, and the interior with a new dashboard using better quality materials.

=== Mexico ===
The Ford EcoSport arrived in Mexico in late 2003 as a 2004 model. The reception by the public was impressive and continued until 2006. For the model year of 2007, sales of the small SUV began slipping and it stopped being a hot seller. Compared to 15,000 units sold in 2004, only 10,000 units of the model year of 2007 were sold. This trend continued to worsen for the refreshed model year of 2008 due in part to a price increase.

Only 6,345 units of the model year 2008 were sold, and the model year 2009 sales through July 2009 were a mere 2,135 units. Due to decreasing sales, and heightened competition from the Ford Escape, Ford announced that a shortened 2010 model year would be the last sold in Mexico.

== Second generation (B515; 2012) ==
Second generation
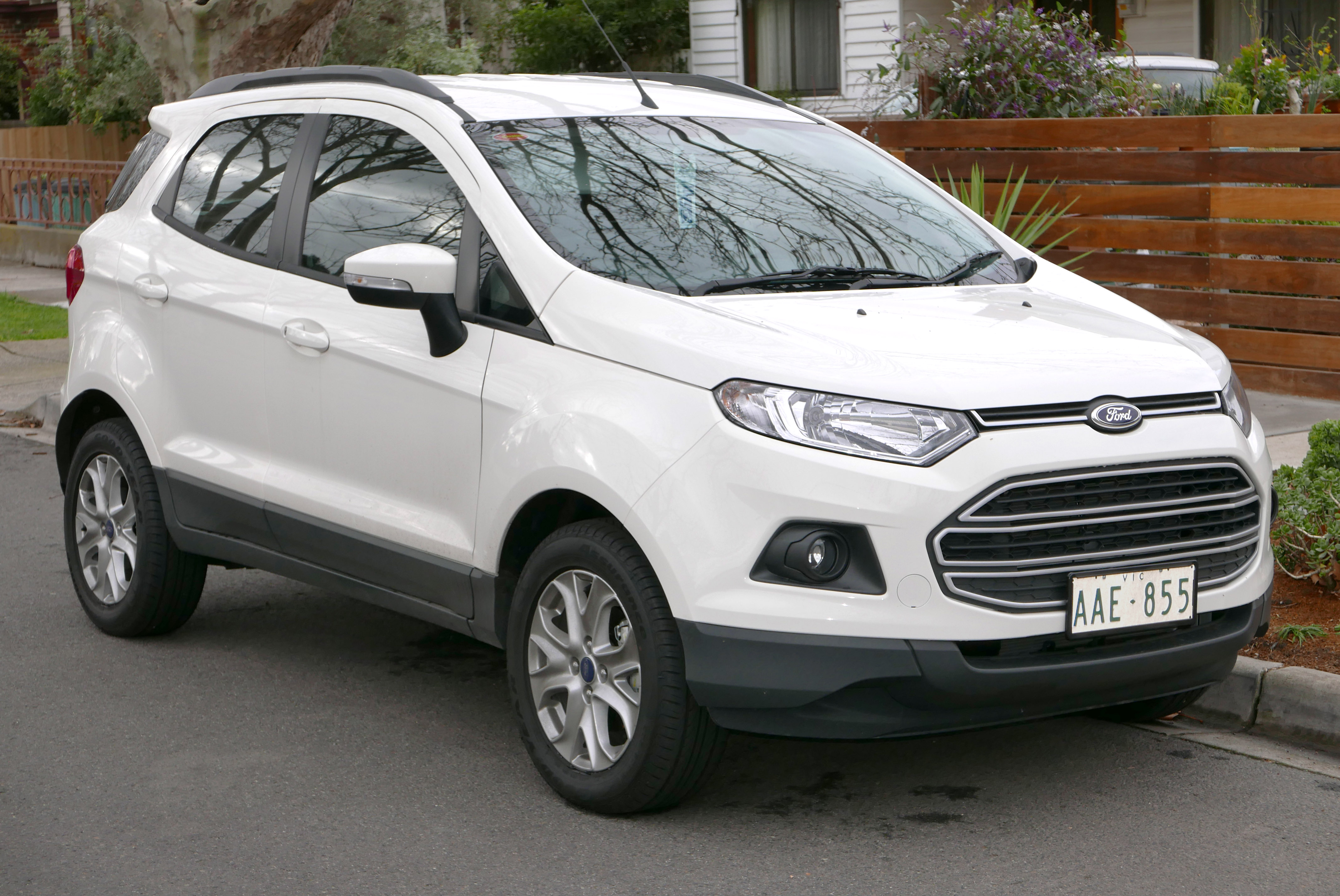

Overview
- Model code: B515; BK (Australia)
- Production: 2012–2021 (India, Brazil); 2013–2020 (China); 2014–2018 (Thailand); 2014–2019 (Russia); 2014–2022 (Vietnam); 2017–2022 (Romania)
- Model years: 2014–2023 (Europe); 2018–2022 (United States)
- Assembly: Brazil: Camaçari (Ford Brazil); India: Chennai (Ford India); Romania: Craiova (Ford Romania); Thailand: Rayong (FTM); China: Chongqing (Changan Ford); Russia: Naberezhnye Chelny (Ford Sollers); Vietnam: Hai Duong (Ford Vietnam)
- Designer: Ehab Kaoud

Body and chassis
- Platform: Ford Global B-car Platform
- Related: Ford Fiesta Mk VI; Ford B-Max; Mazda2

Powertrain
- Engine: Petrol: 1.0 L EcoBoost (Fox) turbo Ti-VCT I3; 1.5 L Dragon Ti-VCT I3; 1.5 L Sigma Ti-VCT I4; 1.6 L Sigma Ti-VCT I4; 2.0 L Duratec Ti-VCT I4; Diesel: 1.5 L EcoBlue (Panther) turbo I4; 1.5 L Duratorq TDCi (DLD-415) turbo I4
- Transmission: 5-speed manual; 6-speed manual; 4-speed automatic; 6-speed automatic; 6-speed DCT

Dimensions
- Wheelbase: 2,519 mm (99.2 in)
- Length: 4,017 mm (158.1 in); 3,998 mm (157.4 in) (India)
- Width: 1,765 mm (69.5 in)
- Height: 1,650 mm (65 in)
- Curb weight: 1,220–1,314 kg (2,690–2,897 lb)

Chronology
- Successor: Ford Puma (Australasia)

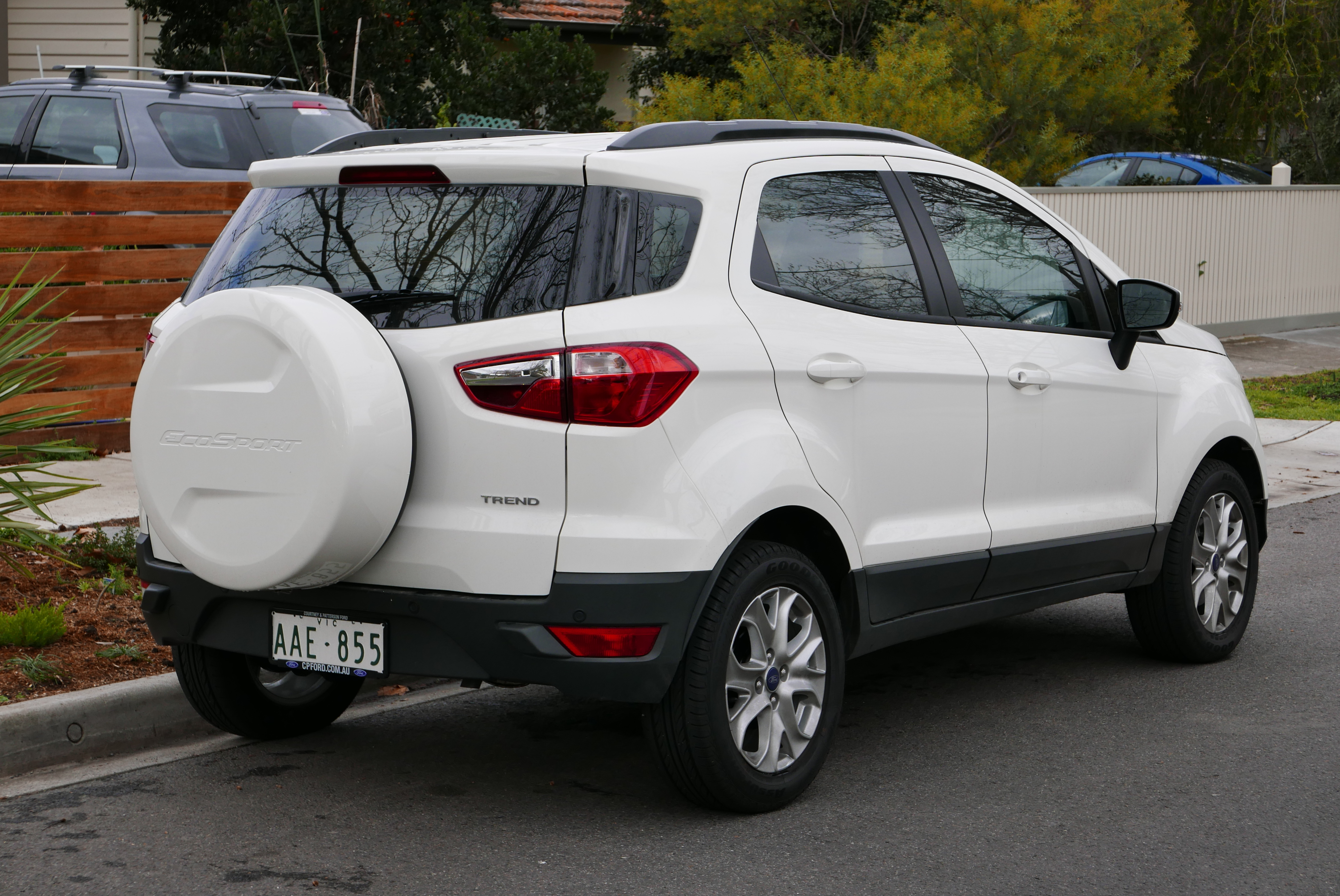
Rear view

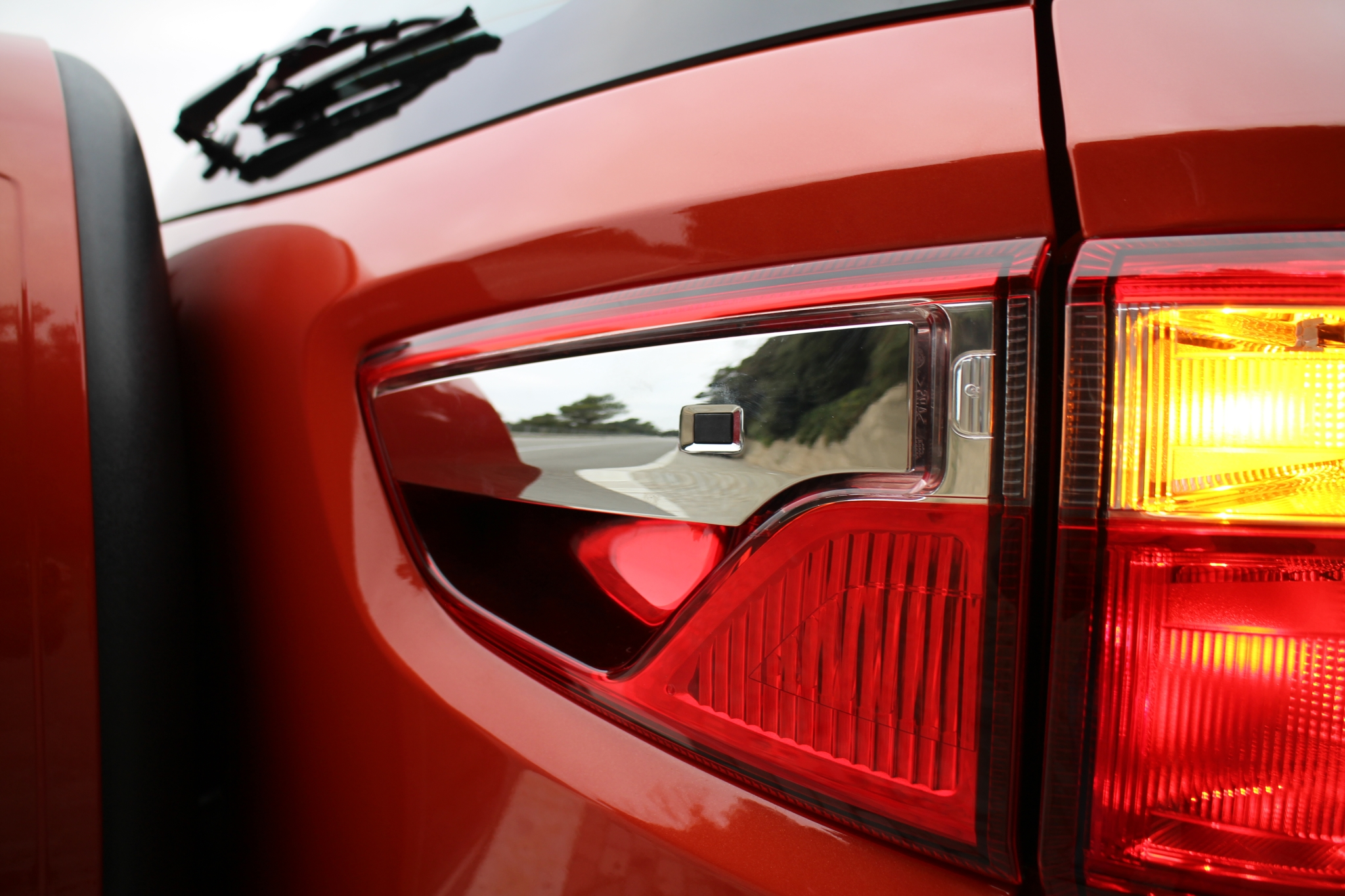
Back door handle, integrated into a faux taillight piece

The second-generation EcoSport was developed under Ford's global product development process in Ford Brazil Development Center. Designated under the project code B515 and the model code BK in Australia, it was based on the Fiesta B2E platform. The second-generation EcoSport was first showcased as a concept at the 2012 New Delhi Auto Expo, in India on 4 January 2012, and was launched in Brazil on 14 July 2012.

Ford showed the production variant of the Ford EcoSport in China, planning to begin sales in March 2013. In addition to China, the vehicle was also made at Ford India's Chennai plant, for domestic sale and export initially to the European, and by 2018, the North American, markets. Ford's Rayong plant in Thailand produced the EcoSport for Southeast Asian markets.

As of August 2015, Ford's Indian plant had already sold 200,000 EcoSports; 112,000 of which were sold in India while the rest were exported to South Africa, Taiwan, Japan, Australia, and Europe. In November 2016, Ford announced plans to supply the EcoSport from India to the United States.

In some countries, The EcoSport has a 1.0-litre three cylinder turbocharged EcoBoost petrol engine which has a power output of 120 PS (88 kW; 118 bhp) and 170 N⋅m (125 lb⋅ft) of torque. The engine has Twin Independent Variable Camshaft Timing (Ti-VCT) which contributes to the turbocharged engine's peak torque starting at 1,300 rpm. The EcoSport can tow up to 700 kg (1,500 lb).

In 2018, Ford ended passenger cars production in Thailand, effectively ending EcoSport production. Ford continues to build pickup trucks and its SUV derivative in the country. In 2019, Ford Sollers closed their factory in Naberezhnye, Chelny (Russia) ending production of EcoSport in Russia. In 2020, the EcoSport was discontinued from Ford's Australia and New Zealand lineup, with the European-market Ford Puma serving as its replacement. In mid-2022, Ford ended production of the EcoSport in India, and in Vietnam in early 2022.

On 11 January 2021, Ford announced cost-saving plans to shutter three plants in Brazil, ending EcoSport, Ka (Figo) and Troller T4 production there.

=== Powertrains ===
Engines available include the 1.0-litre EcoBoost developed at Ford's Dunton Technical Center in the UK. It is a turbocharged, cast aluminium block three cylinder made in a 74 kW (99 hp) and 88 to 92 kW (118 to 123 hp) version, with the latter delivering a peak torque of 170 N⋅m (130 lbf⋅ft) from 1,300–4,500 rpm and 200 N⋅m (150 lbf⋅ft) on overboost. The use of aluminium for the engine block instead of cast-iron improved engine warm-up time by 50 percent.

The three-cylinder engine design causes inherent vibrations, which are countered by a deliberately unbalanced flywheel, which has less friction than balance shafts.

The exhaust manifold is cast into the cylinder head, reducing engine warm up time. The engine block's height and width dimensions are comparable to an A4 size sheet of paper. This EcoSport version was available in China, Europe, India, the United States, but not Brazil. The Brazilian EcoSport has a 1.6 litre petrol engine, which produces 113 bhp (84 kW) and 115 lb⋅ft (156 N⋅m) torque.

The Russian EcoSport comes with two different engines: a 1.6-litre, which produces 122 bhp (90 kW) and 148 Nm, and a 2.0-litre, which produces 140 bhp (90 kW) and 186 Nm. The 2.0-litre version of EcoSport comes as AWD with manual transmission, while the 1.6-litre is 2WD only but available with six speed manual or PowerShift automotive transmissions.

Along with the 1.0-litre EcoBoost engine, the Chinese and the Indian market also get a 1.5-litre Ti-VCT petrol engine, which produces 108 bhp (81 kW) and 140 Nm (103 lb.ft). The EcoSport also has a 1.5-litre TDCi BS6 diesel engine that outputs 98 bhp (73 kW) power at 3,750 rpm and 215 N⋅m (159 lbf⋅ft) of torque at 1,750-2,500 rpm.

=== Marketing ===
==== India ====
The Indian market was among the first few to receive EcoSport. The car was manufactured at Ford India's Chennai plant, available in Six trims (Ambiente, Trend, Titanium, Titanium+, Sports & Thunder edition) with the choice of two engine options, 1.5-litre Ti-VCT Dragon series petrol engine and 1.5-litre TDCi diesel engine. The engines are available with five speed manual and only petrol engine available with 6-speed torque converter transmission. The 1.0-litre EcoBoost petrol engine has been dropped after the vehicle has been upgraded to meet the BS6 emission compliance norms.

In 2017, the facelifted EcoSport contains 80% Indian parts.

==== Japan ====
At its introduction internationally, it was also made available in Japan, as the smallest companion to the Ford Kuga and the Ford Explorer. All engines except the diesel are offered in Japan, with a five-speed manual or six-speed dual clutch transmission, and optional all-wheel drive.

==== Europe ====
Ford launched the EcoSport in Europe during 2014, with a limited first batch of 500 units arriving in the first quarter of the year. The announcement was made in September 2013, at the IFA exhibition in Berlin, and the first limited-edition versions could be ordered on a dedicated website. After disappointing sales figures in Europe in 2014, during which the EcoSport only sold 11,000 units against over 100,000 for each of its main competitors, the car was revised in 2015, to make it more suitable to European tastes. In March 2016, it was announced that the Ford EcoSport would be built in Romania, at Craiova plant starting from the autumn of 2017, moving production for the European market from the current plant in Chennai, India. This happened on the background of the growing market for the SUV segment in Europe, and would bring an investment of €200 million to the factory.

=== Safety ===
The Ford EcoSport has Ford SYNC driver connect system, a command system codeveloped with Microsoft. It also has airbags, anti-lock brakes (ABS), electronic stability program (ESP), electric power assisted steering (EPAS), and Hill Launch Assist, Traction control System (TCS) and rear parking sensors.

The EcoSport in its most basic Latin American market configuration received 4 stars for adult occupants and 3 stars for toddlers from Latin NCAP 1.0 in March 2013.

Latin NCAP 1.5 test results Ford Ecosport + 2 Airbags (2013, similar to Euro NCAP 2002)
| Test | Points | Stars |
|---|---|---|
| Adult occupant: | 13.64/17.0 | 4 /5 stars |
| Child occupant: | 31.00/49.00 | 3 /5 stars |

The updated EcoSport in its most basic Latin American market configuration received 5 stars for adult occupants and 3 stars for toddlers from Latin NCAP 1.0 in November 2013.

Latin NCAP 1.5 test results Ford Ecosport + 2 Airbags (from August 2013) (2013, similar to Euro NCAP 2002)
| Test | Points | Stars |
|---|---|---|
| Adult occupant: | 14.64/17.0 | 4 /5 stars |
| Child occupant: | 31.00/49.00 | 3 /5 stars |

The EcoSport in its standard European market configuration received 4 stars from Euro NCAP in 2013.

ANCAP test results* Ford EcoSport all variants (2013)
| Test | Score |
|---|---|
| Overall | 5 /5 stars |
| Frontal offset | 15.14/16 |
| Side impact | 16/16 |
| Pole | 2/2 |
| Seat belt reminders | 2/3 |
| Whiplash protection | Good |
| Pedestrian protection | Adequate |
| Electronic stability control | Standard |

ANCAP test results* Ford EcoSport all variants (2013)
| Test | Score |
|---|---|
| Overall | 5 /5 stars |
| Frontal offset | 15.14/16 |
| Side impact | 16/16 |
| Pole | 2/2 |
| Seat belt reminders | 2/3 |
| Whiplash protection | Good |
| Pedestrian protection | Adequate |
| Electronic stability control | Standard |

=== 2017 facelift ===
The EcoSport's mid-cycle updates were announced at 2016 Los Angeles Auto Show for the 2018 model year, including a revised front end design, and a redesigned rear bumper. The dashboard has an optional 8-inch floating touchscreen infotainment system that supports both Apple CarPlay and Android Auto.

Sales of the EcoSport in the US market began in 2018. Early models include the 1.0 EcoBoost three-cylinder turbo gasoline engine for FWD models and the 2.0 four cylinder petrol naturally aspirated engine for 4WD models. Both engines have a six-speed automatic transmission. The Australian-, Canadian- and US-market EcoSports, made in India, have the rear mounted spare tire as optional on the base model.

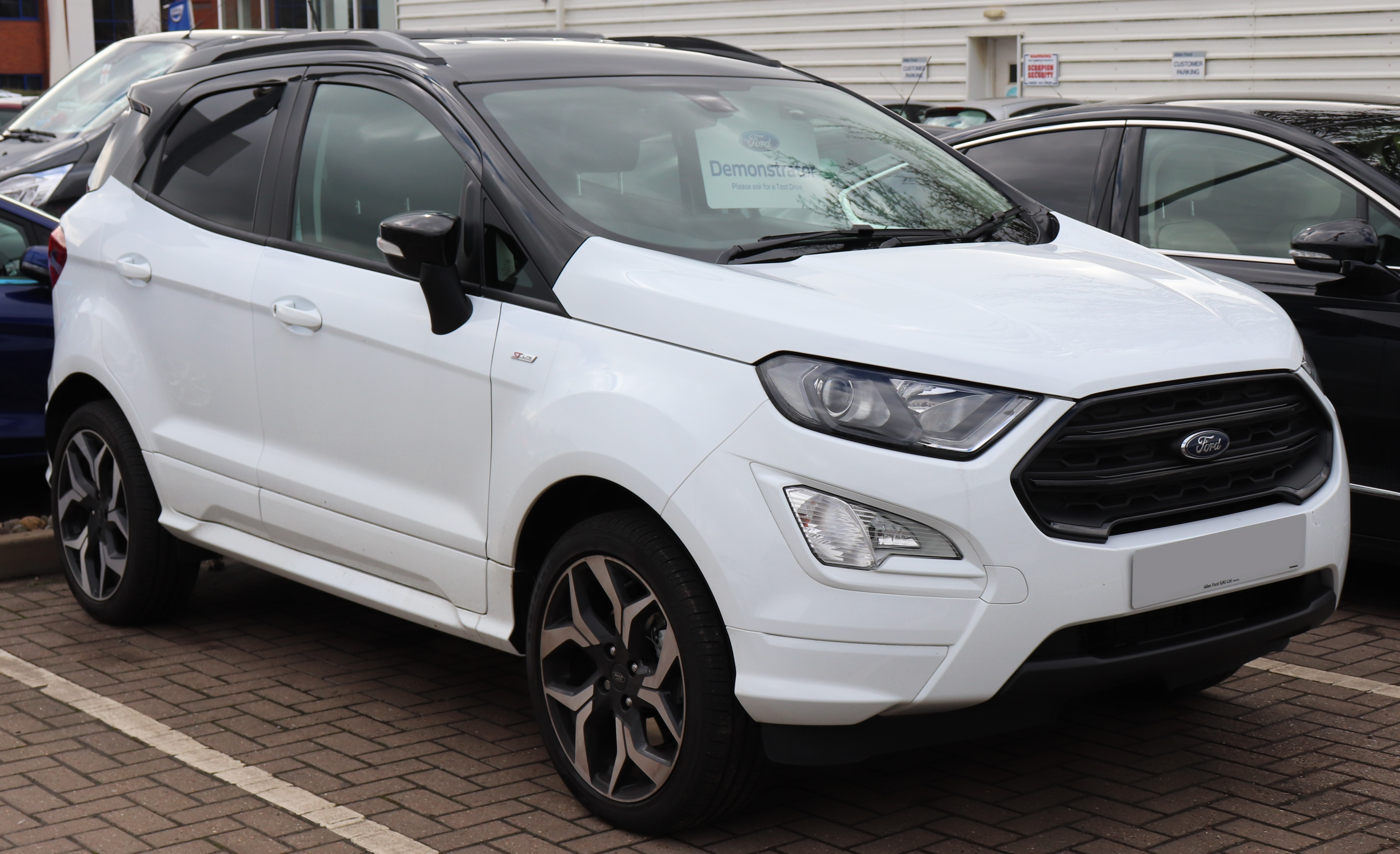
2018 Ford EcoSport (facelift)

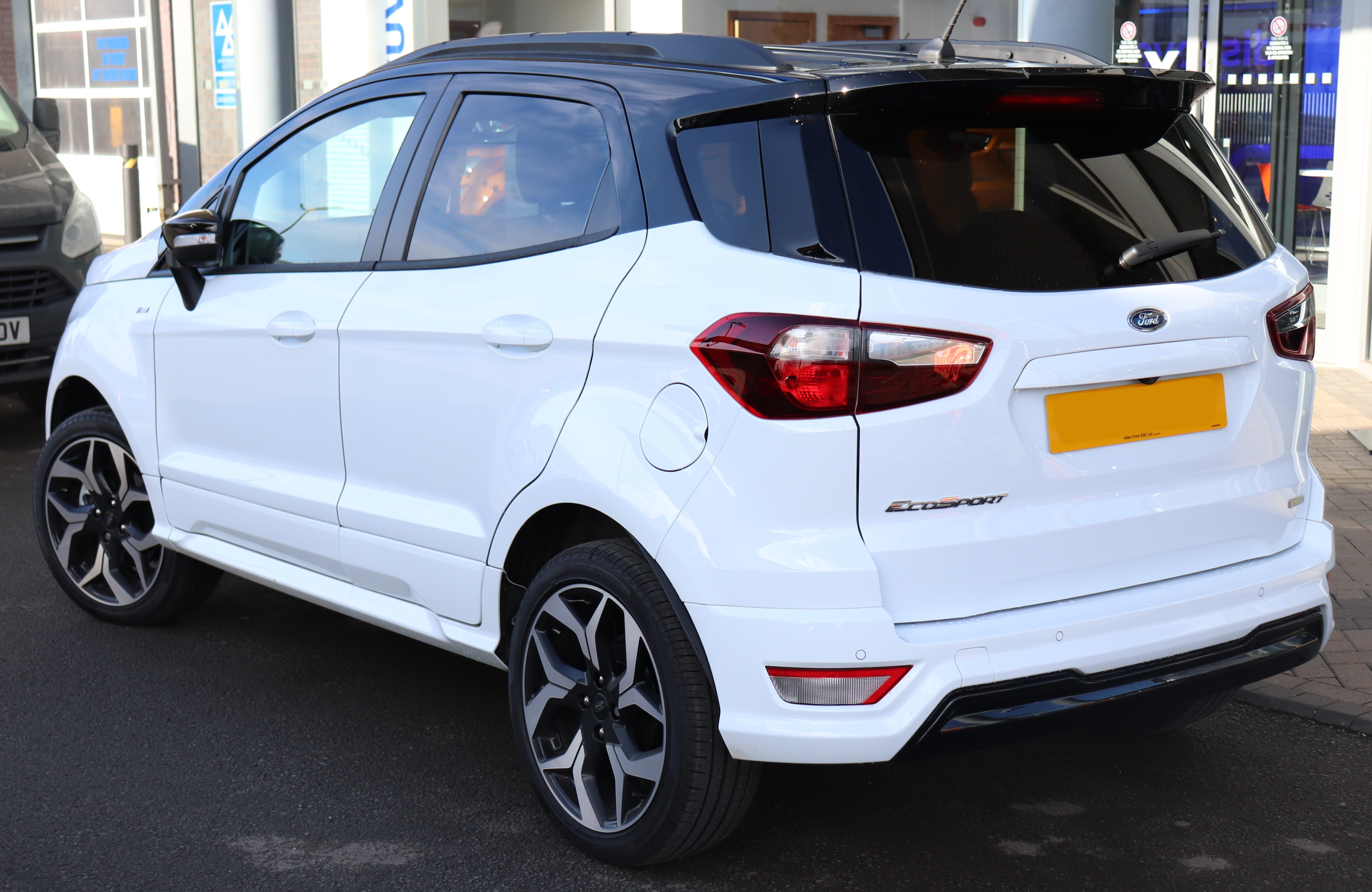
Rear view

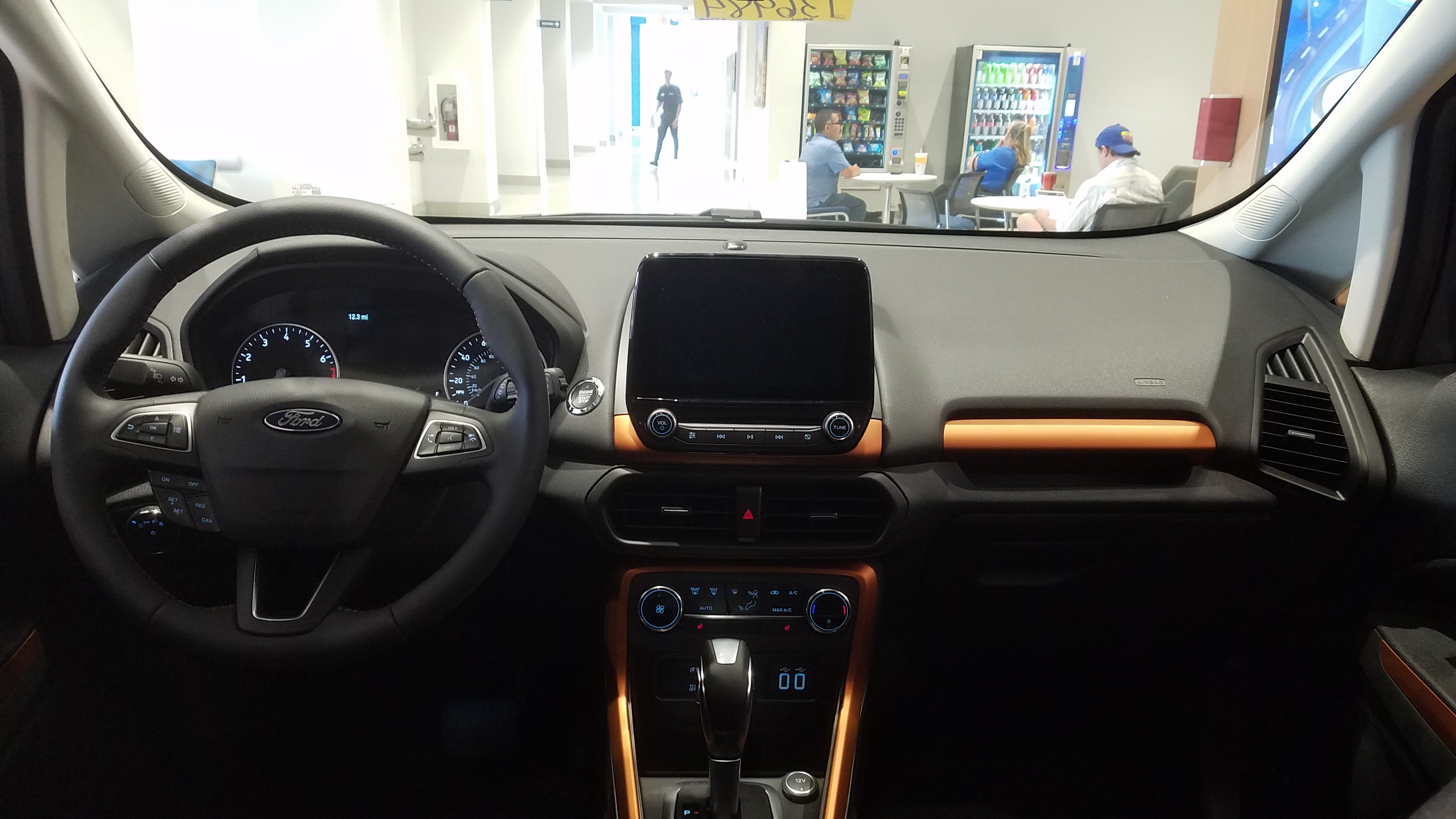
Interior

=== 2021 facelift ===
The EcoSport was due to receive a facelift for the Indian market, but was cancelled suddenly as the Sanand plant will be closing in the fourth quarter of 2021 along with the Chennai plant in the second half of 2022. As a result of that, a stop production of the EcoSport was issued through Ford of India. Additionally, all models that were due to be exported to Argentina, Mexico, Canada, and the US have all been cancelled as well, however, the EcoSport will still be sold in Europe and will be built at facility in Romania. Its Indian production restarted on 24 September 2021 for 2 years.

=== Discontinuation ===
The EcoSport was discontinued in the US and India in mid-2022, due to decreased sales and Ford ending manufacturing in India. In the US market, the new entry-level model will be the Ford Maverick pickup truck. The EcoSport remained on sale in the Mexican market until 2022.

Ford discontinued production of the Ecosport at the Craiova factory in Romania at the end of 2022, but sales will continue from accumulated stock in Europe until the end of 2023.

== Sales ==
| Year | Europe | India | Brazil | Argentina | China | Thailand | Philippines | U.S. | Canada | South Africa | Vietnam |
|---|---|---|---|---|---|---|---|---|---|---|---|
| 2003 | | | 27,177 | | | | | | | | |
| 2004 | | | 38,668 | | | | | | | | |
| 2005 | | | 45,420 | | | | | | | | |
| 2006 | | | 43,589 | | | | | | | | |
| 2007 | | | 47,025 | | | | | | | | |
| 2008 | | | 44,179 | | | | | | | | |
| 2009 | | | 43,577 | | | | | | | | |
| 2010 | | | 43,030 | | | | | | | | |
| 2011 | | | 38,531 | | | | | | | | |
| 2012 | | | 38,287 | | | | | | | | |
| 2013 | | 33,702 | 66,103 | | 59,680 | | | | | | |
| 2014 | 12,890 | 51,068 | 54,262 | | 84,643 | 6,289 | | | | | 1,625 |
| 2015 | 40,084 | 42,403 | 33,861 | | 56,465 | 3,555 | 8,056 | | | 11,626 | 3,977 |
| 2016 | 57,294 | 45,710 | 28,105 | | 42,393 | 2,167 | 9,622 | | | 11,442 | 5,415 |
| 2017 | 63,150 | 45,146 | 31,195 | | 33,972 | 2,919 | 11,299 | | | 9,920 | 3,977 |
| 2018 | 110,574 | 51,973 | 34,497 | | 16,033 | 696 | 5,024 | 54,348 | 6,315 | 5,769 | 4,844 |
| 2019 | 120,376 | 39,989 | 34,206 | | 2,924 | | 2,138 | 64,708 | 7,437 | 9,802 | 4,006 |
| 2020 | 47,548 | 27,181 | 24,035 | 7,453 | 2,670 | | 846 | 60,545 | 4,866 | 7,255 | 2,813 |
| 2021 | 31,081 | 20,789 | 2,992 | 4,143 | | | 1,500 | 40,659 | 2,968 | 5,947 | 1,490 |
| 2022 | | | 44 | | | | | 29,193 | | | |
| 2023 | | | 5 | | | | | 2,508 | | | |
