= Ford Focus (first generation) =

First generation of Ford Focus

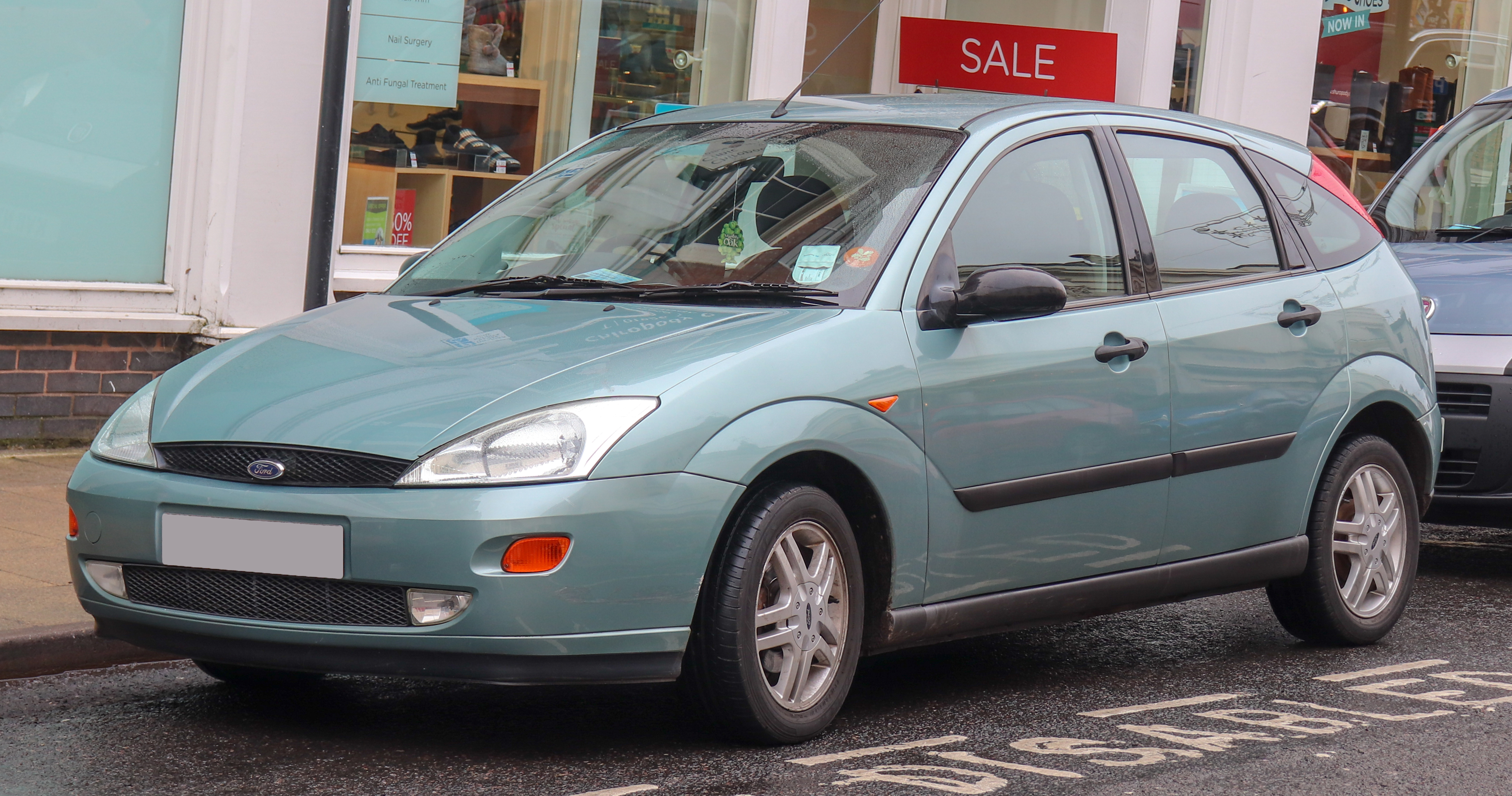

Overview
- Manufacturer: Ford
- Production: 1998–2007
- Model years: 1998–2005 (Europe); 2000–2008 (Argentina); 2000–2007 (North America)
- Assembly: Germany: Saarlouis (Saarlouis Body & Assembly); Spain: Valencia (Ford Valencia Plant); United States: Wayne, Michigan (Wayne Stamping & Assembly); Mexico: Hermosillo (Hermosillo Stamping & Assembly); Argentina: General Pacheco (Ford Argentina); Philippines: Santa Rosa, Laguna (FMCP); Venezuela: Valencia (Valencia Assembly)
- Designer: John Doughty (1995) & Claude Lobo (1995)

Body and chassis
- Class: Compact car / small family car (C)
- Body style: 3- and 5-door hatchback; 4-door saloon/sedan; 5-door estate/station wagon
- Layout: Front-engine, front-wheel-drive

Powertrain
- Engine: See below
- Transmission: See below

Chronology
- Predecessor: Ford Escort (Europe/Latin America/South Africa); Ford Escort (North America); Ford Laser (Asia and Australia)
- Successor: Ford Focus (second generation, Europe); Ford Focus (second generation, North America)

The Ford Focus (first generation) is a compact car that was manufactured by Ford in Europe from 1998 to 2004 and by Ford in North America from 1998 to 2007. Ford began sales of the Focus to Europe in July 1998 and in North America during 1999 for the 2000 model year. Manufacturing in Argentina continued until 2008, and it was still on sale in Brazil until 2009.

In Europe and South Africa, the Focus replaced the various Ford Escort models sold in those markets. In Asia and Australia, it replaced the Ford Laser.

== Design and engineering ==
Codenamed C170 during its development, the original Focus took its eventual name from a Ghia concept car which was shown at the Geneva Motor Show in 1991. Certain elements of the design had been seen even earlier in prototypes used by Ford to demonstrate forthcoming safety features, such as the eye-level rear lighting clusters. As a continuation of Ford's New Edge styling philosophy, first seen in the Ford Ka in 1996, and Ford Cougar in 1998, the Focus's styling was often described as polarising. The styling had been overseen by Jack Telnack and executed by Claude Lobo and Australian designer, John Doughty, concluding in January 1996 upon program approval.

The decision to name the new car the Ford Focus was made in early 1998, as Ford had been planning to keep the "Escort" nameplate for its new generation of small family cars. A last minute problem arose in July 1998 when a Cologne court, responding to a case brought by the publishers Burda, ordered Ford to avoid the name "Focus" for the German market cars since the name was already taken by the publisher's Focus magazine. This eleventh hour dispute was overcome, however, and the car was launched without a different "German market" name. The Focus once again represented an attempt by Ford to introduce a true "world car" that could be sold in disparate markets with little modification. Previous attempts to achieve this had met with limited success - the concept for the original 1981 Escort had infamously mutated into two entirely different cars for Europe and North America with only superficial similarities between the two. Ford had tried again with the 1993 Mondeo and Contour/Mystique but the two variants still had too many differences to be called a true single car for both American and European consumption.

The Ford Focus was officially revealed at the Geneva Motor Show in March 1998.

=== Design ===
Focus models had been designed under the directorship of Richard Parry-Jones and were noted at introduction for their styling, class-leading rear suspension and tall interior packaging – as well as a stiff and light body structure, low-friction steering and suspension, and extensive safety and convenience features including driver and passenger airbags, available head-and-chest side air bags, rear ISOFIX child-safety seat attachments, safety belt system with pre-tensioners and load-limiting retractors, battery saver to automatically switch off lights after 10 minutes, interior light dimming feature, and flip-up/flat-folding rear seat cushions.

=== Styling ===
The Focus' styling, often noted as polarizing, was marketed by Ford as New Edge design. The design language had been overseen by Jack Telnack and Claude Lobo and executed by Australian designer, John Doughty. In 2000, Karl Brauer, writing for Edmunds.com described the styling: "While ergonomically sound, the Focus' interior, like its exterior, displays much of Ford's New Edge philosophy that had editors split on loving or hating it." Sherri Koucky, writing for MachineDesign.com said the styling "mixes round shapes with funky geometric ones and adds sharp angles, somehow making them all work together." James R. Healey, writing for USA Today, called the styling a "collision of curves and lines." After the international Ford Focus, which shared styling with North American models, had won the prestigious European Car of the Year (1999), William Diem of the New York Times wrote, "To some extent, the prize vindicates Ford's risky design for the Focus, especially the New Edge styling -- a combination of straight lines, curves and planes."

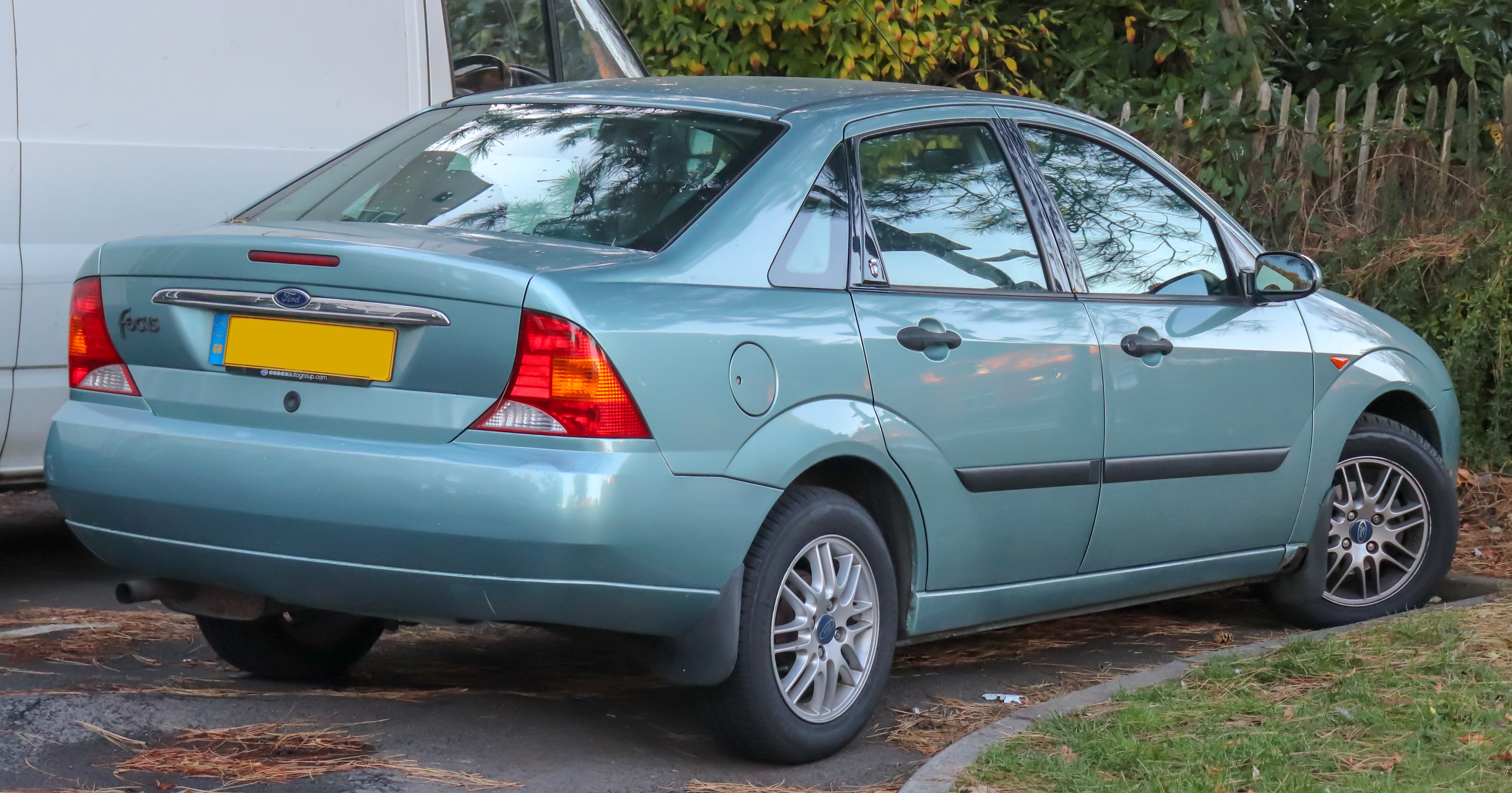
Saloon (pre-facelift)

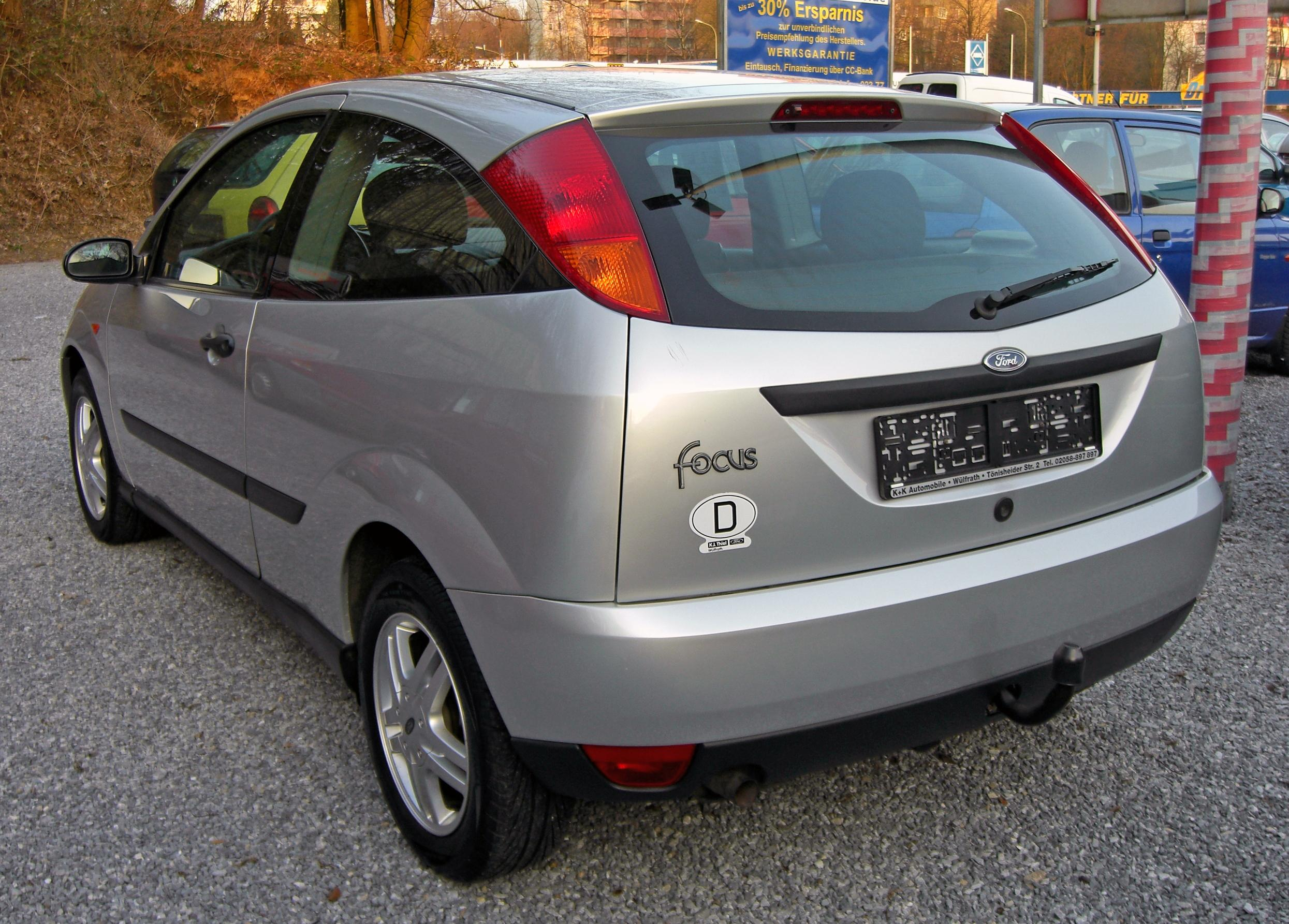
3-door hatchback (pre-facelift)

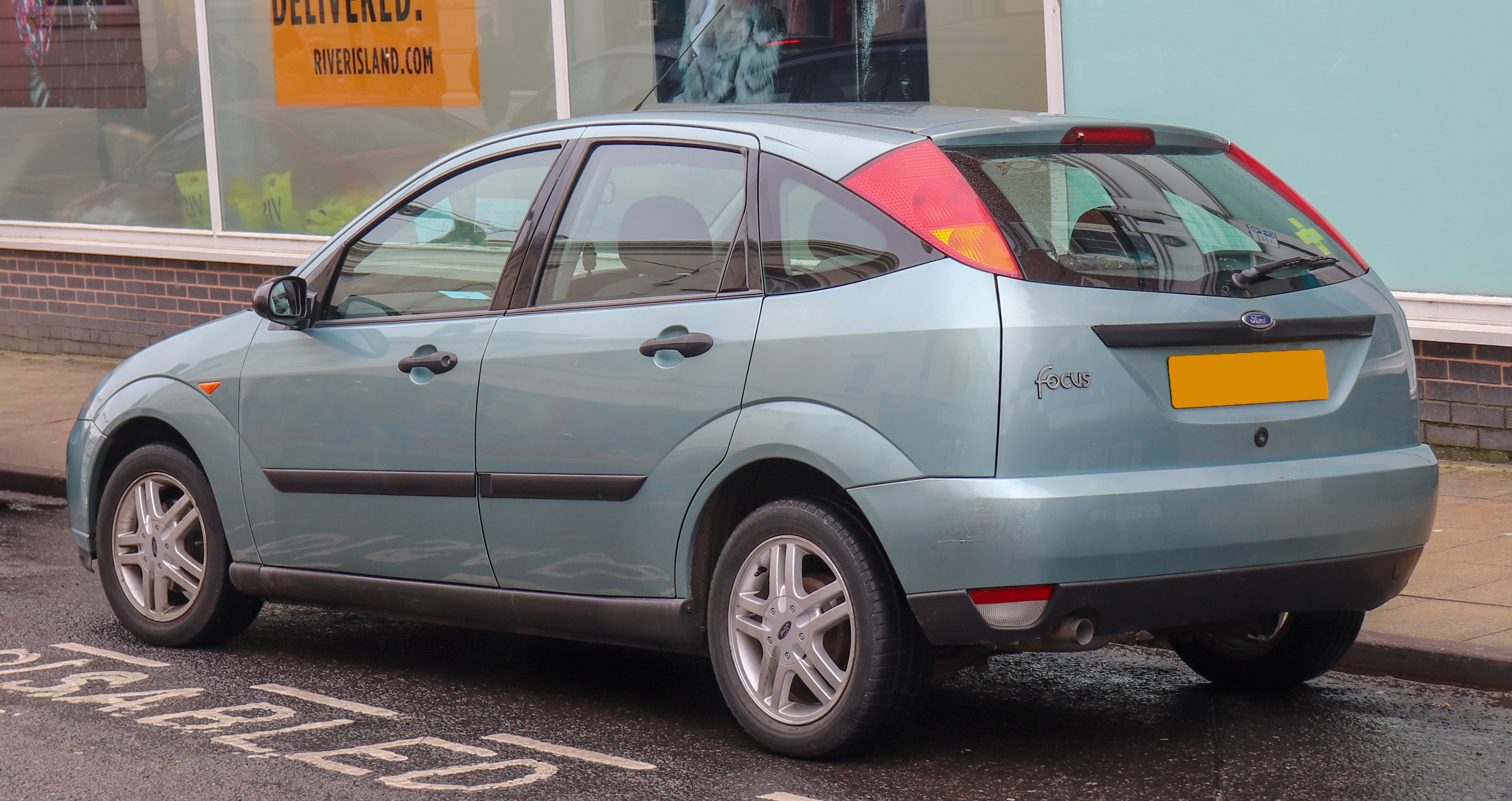
5-door hatchback (pre-facelift)

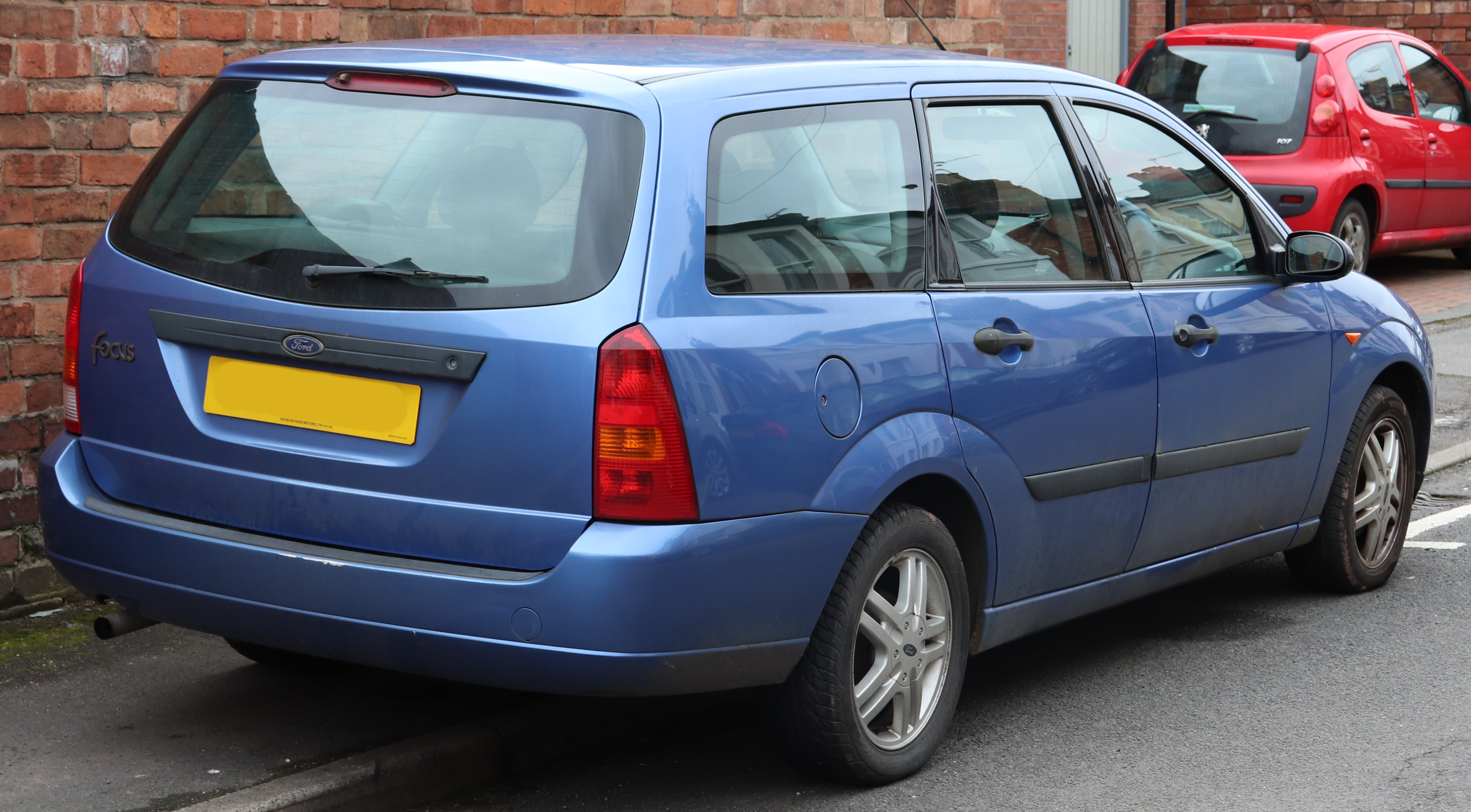
Estate (pre-facelift)

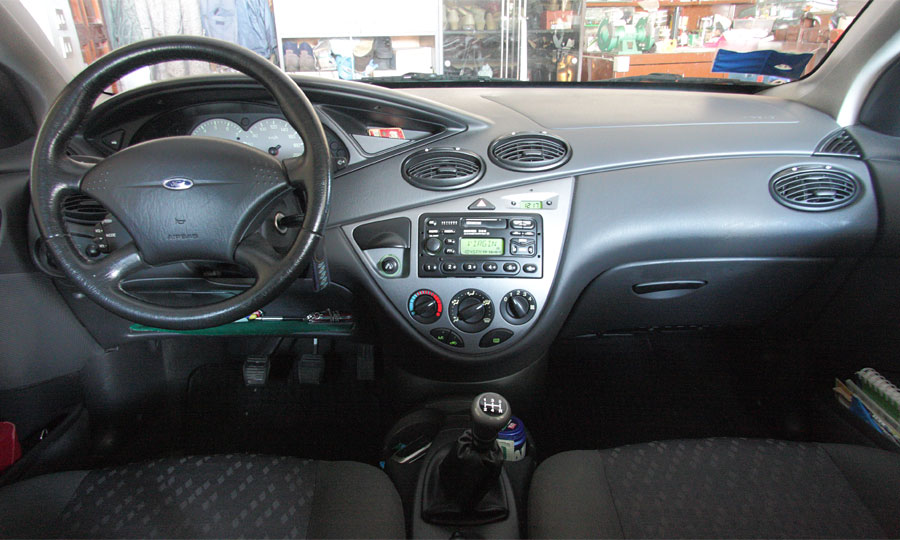
Interior

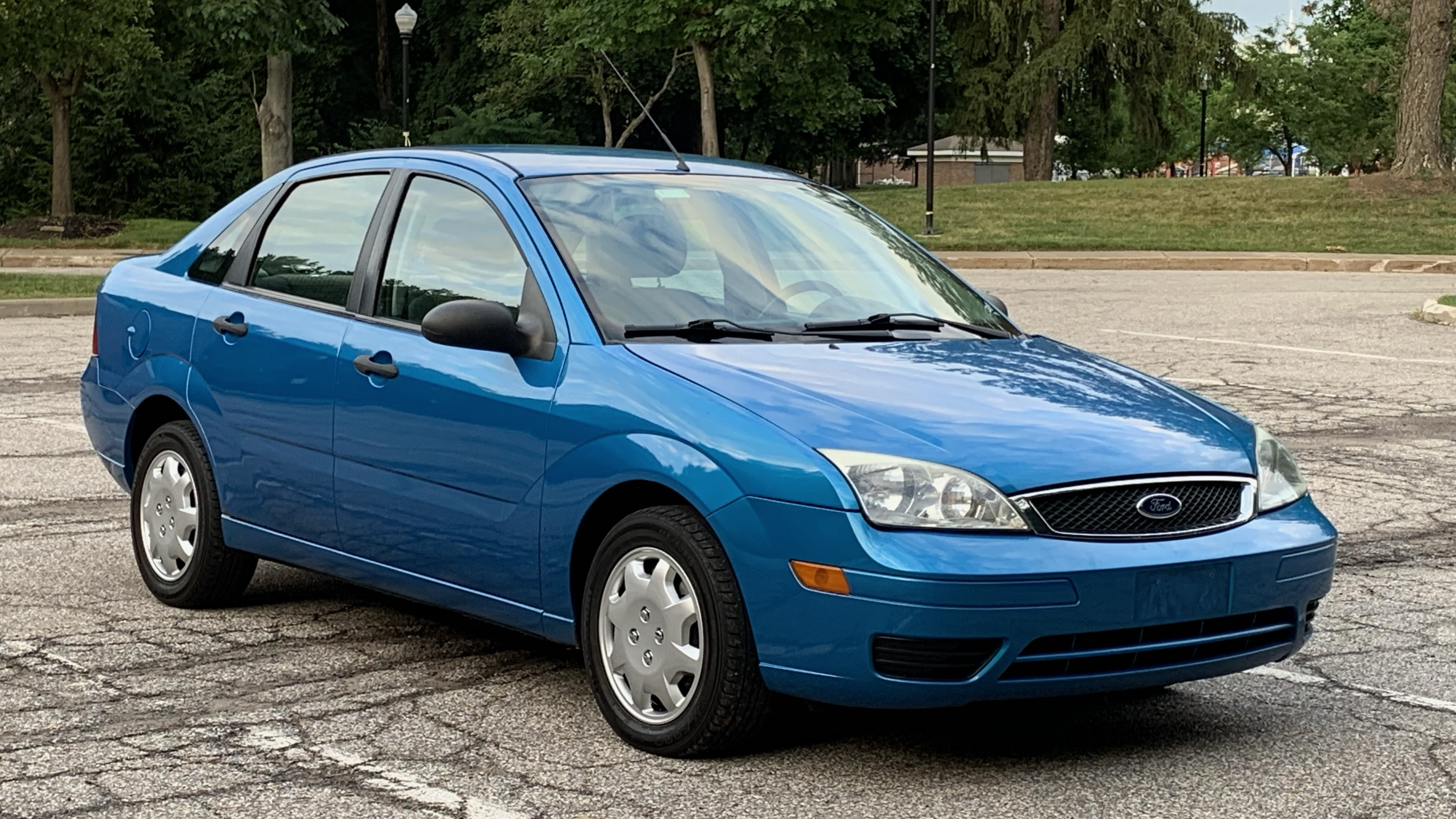
North American-spec Ford Focus saloon/sedan (first generation, post-facelift)

2007 Ford Focus SES Wagon

=== Rear suspension ===
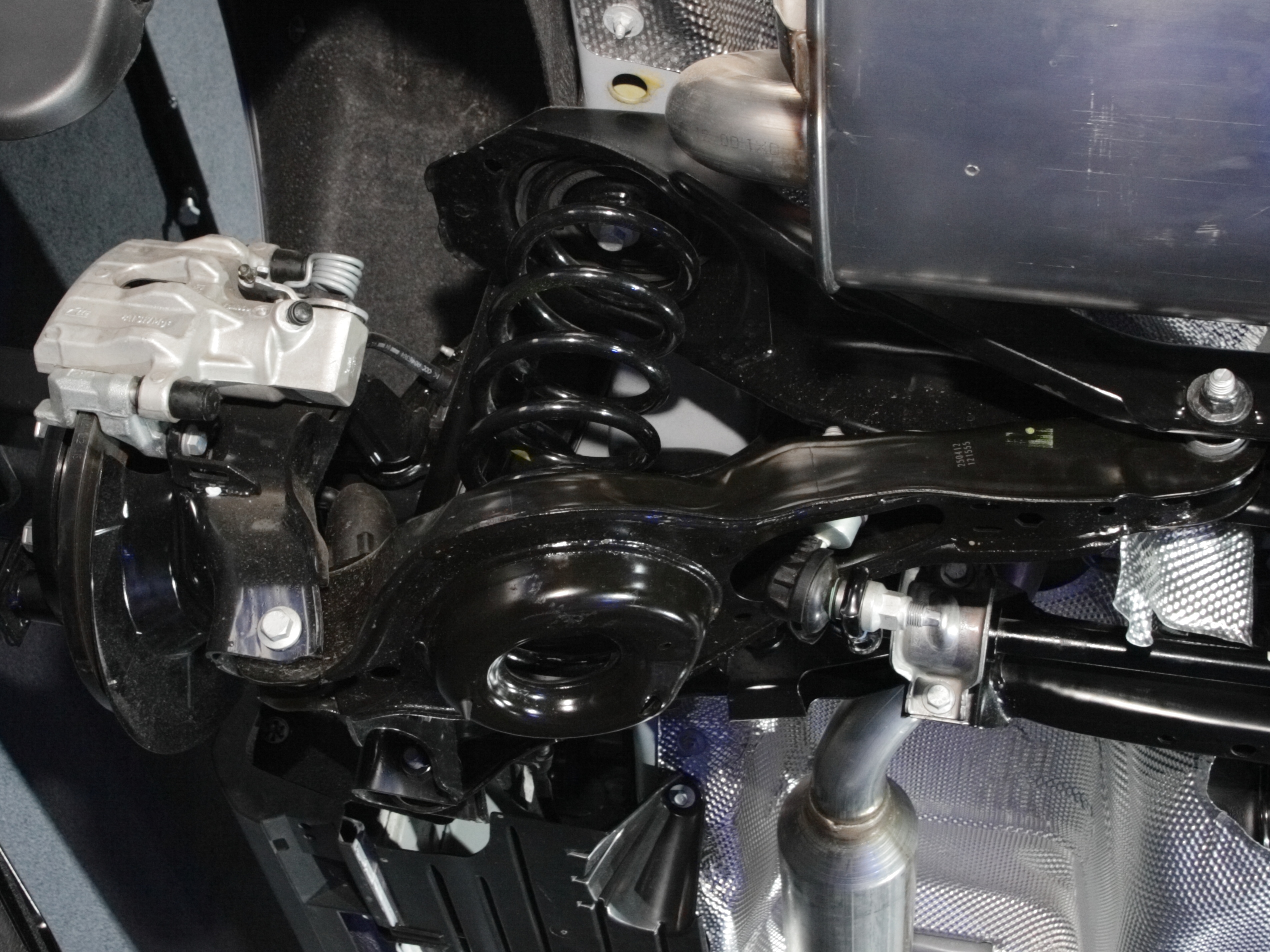
Control Blade suspension

Engineers for the Focus, including Richard Parry-Jones, developed a class-leading, space-saving independent multi-link rear suspension, marketed as Control Blade suspension, combining the packaging of a trailing arm, with the geometry of a double wishbone suspension. The system was developed from that used in the CDW27 Ford Mondeo estate, but with various modifications to make it simpler and cheaper to build and therefore economically viable on a mass-market vehicle.

Where many competitors in the compact class, or small family car (European) class, used the less expensive semi-independent twist-beam rear suspension, Control Blade offered enhanced elasto-kinematic performance, i.e., strong body control, sharp and accurate steering regardless of the car's attitude, and an absorbent and quiet ride over bumps.

Unlike conventional multi-link suspension, Control Blade features a wide, simple, uniform thickness, pressed steel trailing arm with hub carrier – taking the place of two longitudinal locating rods, eliminating an expensive cast knuckle, and offering the same level of body control – with a lower center of gravity, reduced road noise, and at lower production cost. The long rear lateral arm controls toe, a pair of shorter front lateral arms, vertically above each other, control the camber, and the Control Blade reacts to brake and traction loads.

In testing the suspension in 2000, Motor Trend writer Jack Keebler noted "The Focus' average speed of 62.6 mph through our slalom makes it faster around the cones than a $62,000 Jaguar XJ8L and a $300,000 Bentley Continental. The impression is of having plenty of wheel travel for gobbling the larger stuff and big-car, full-frame isolation when encountering expansion joints and smaller road imperfections." Engineers also worked to improve the front suspension, removing sticking and friction (aka stiction) from each component.

Following the 1998 introduction of the Control Blade suspension and its popularization by the Focus, other manufacturers (e.g., Volkswagen with the Golf V) began offering multi-link design rear suspensions in the compact class, or small family car (European) class.

=== Tall packaging ===
Focus engineers developed a new interior packaging for the car's class, with a computer-modeled interior, long wheelbase, tall doors, raised roofline, increased passenger and cargo volume, raised rear seating and raised H-point front seating providing higher sight lines and increased rear footroom. James R. Healey, writing for USA Today, said "Focus is bigger inside than cars much larger outside." Ford later marketed the high H-point seating as Command Seating, noting that "the higher the H-Point, the higher you ride in the car, and in some cases, the more comfortable you feel behind the wheel".

== Markets ==
=== Europe (1998–2005) ===
Ford Focus (Europe)
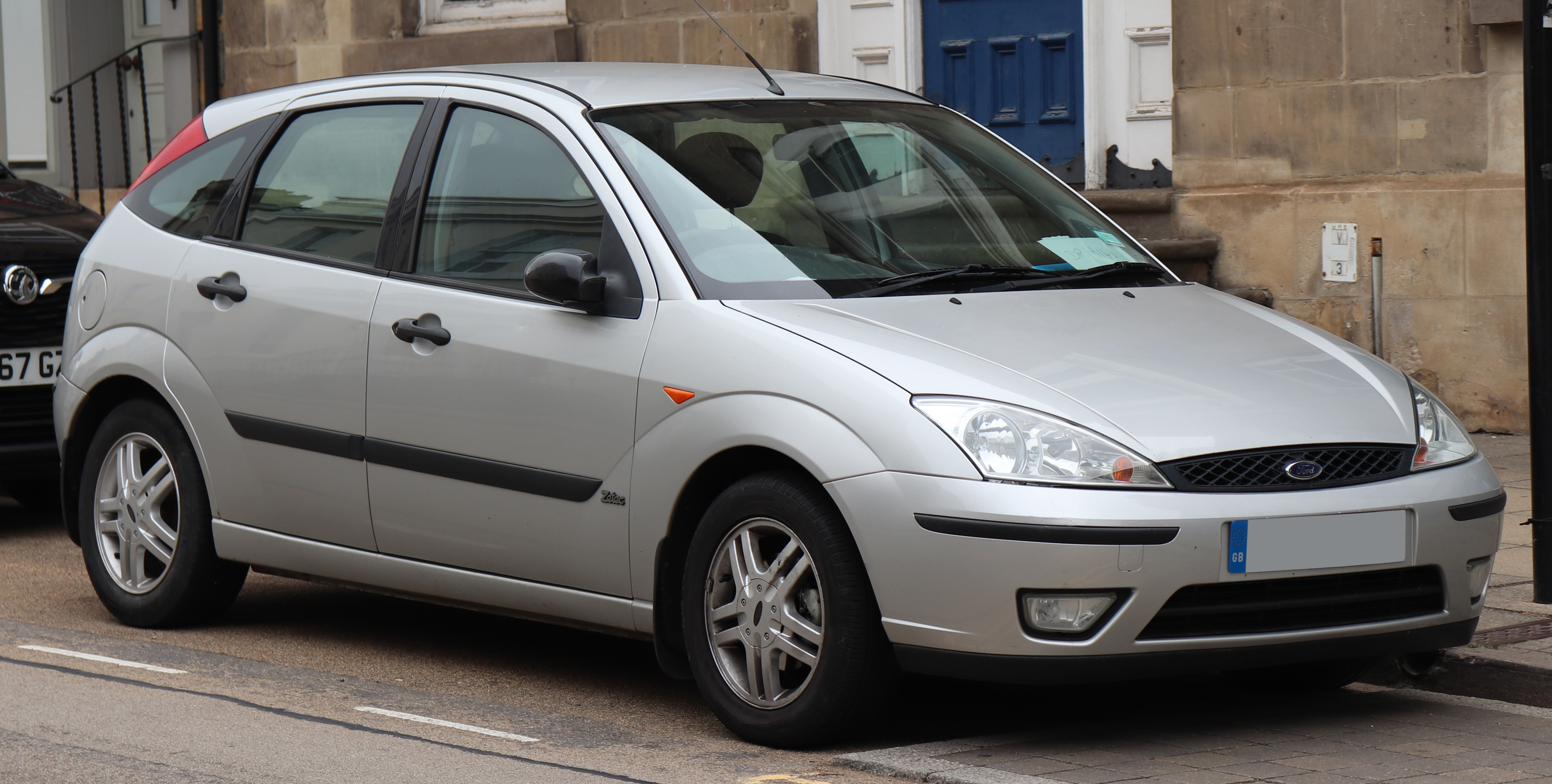

Overview
- Production: 1998–2005; 1999–2008 (Argentina)

Body and chassis
- Body style: 3/5-door hatchback; 4-door saloon; 5-door estate
- Layout: FF layout
- Platform: Ford C170 platform

Powertrain
- Engine: Gasoline: 1.4 L Zetec-SE I4; 1.6 L Zetec-SE I4; 1.8 L Zetec-R I4; 2.0 L Zetec-R I4; 2.0 L Duratec-ST170/SVT I4; 2.0 L Duratec-RS Turbo I4; Diesel: 1.8 L Duratorq Lynx TDDi I4; 1.8 L Duratorq DLD-418 TDCi I4
- Transmission: 4-speed 4F27E automatic 5-speed iB5 manual 6-speed Durashift manual (SVT/ST170)

Dimensions
- Wheelbase: 2,615 mm (103.0 in)
- Length: Hatchback: 4,175 mm (164.4 in); Saloon: 4,380 mm (172.4 in); Estate: 4,455 mm (175.4 in)
- Width: 1,700 mm (66.9 in)
- Height: Hatchback and saloon: 1,440 mm (56.7 in); Estate: 1,460 mm (57.5 in)
- Curb weight: 1,150–1,364 kg (2,535–3,007 lb)

==== Manufacturing ====
Historically, the Saarlouis, Valencia, and Halewood plants had produced the Escort, however the Focus was only produced at Saarlouis and Valencia since Halewood was to be switched over to production of the Jaguar X-Type. However the sixth and final generation of the Escort remained in production in Halewood until 2000 as a budget alternative to the Focus, and the van versions continued until 2002 until its replacement by the Focus-based Ford Transit Connect.

The Focus production also took place in Santa Rosa, Philippines (though it was only for export and never offered in the Philippine domestic market); General Pacheco, Argentina; Chungli City, Taiwan and Vsevolozhsk, Russia.

==== 2001 facelift (Mk1.5) ====
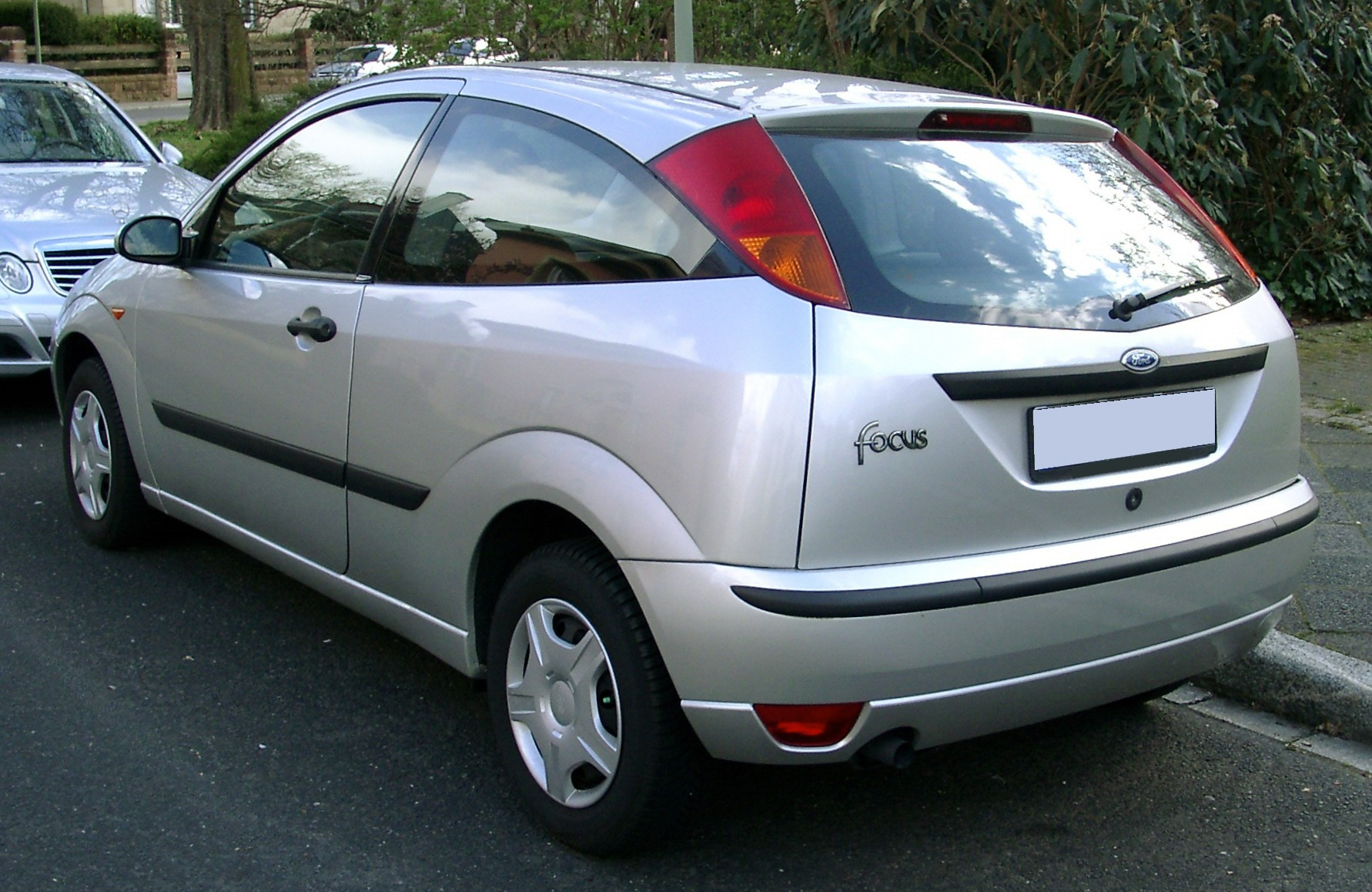
3-door hatchback (facelift)

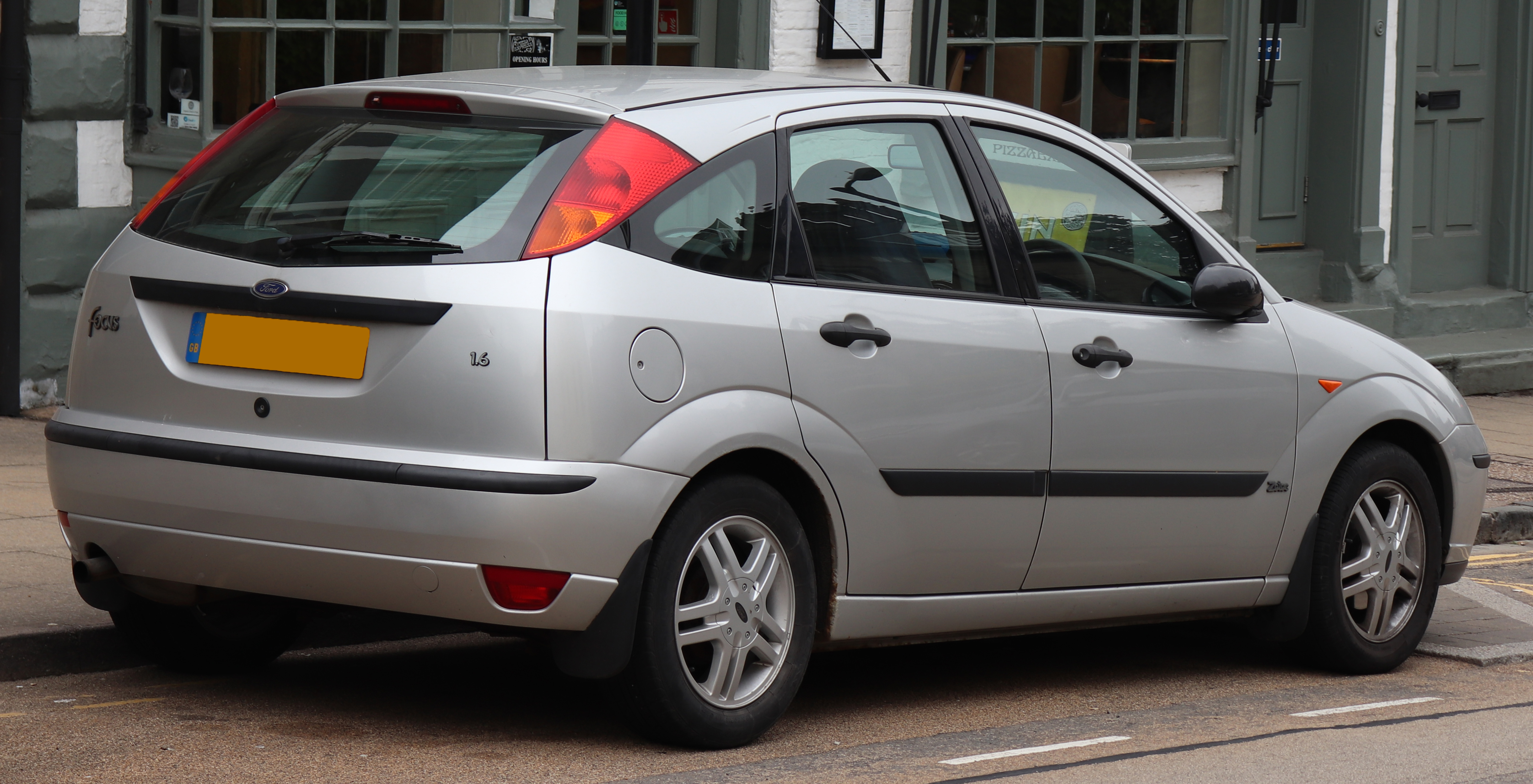
5-door hatchback (facelift)

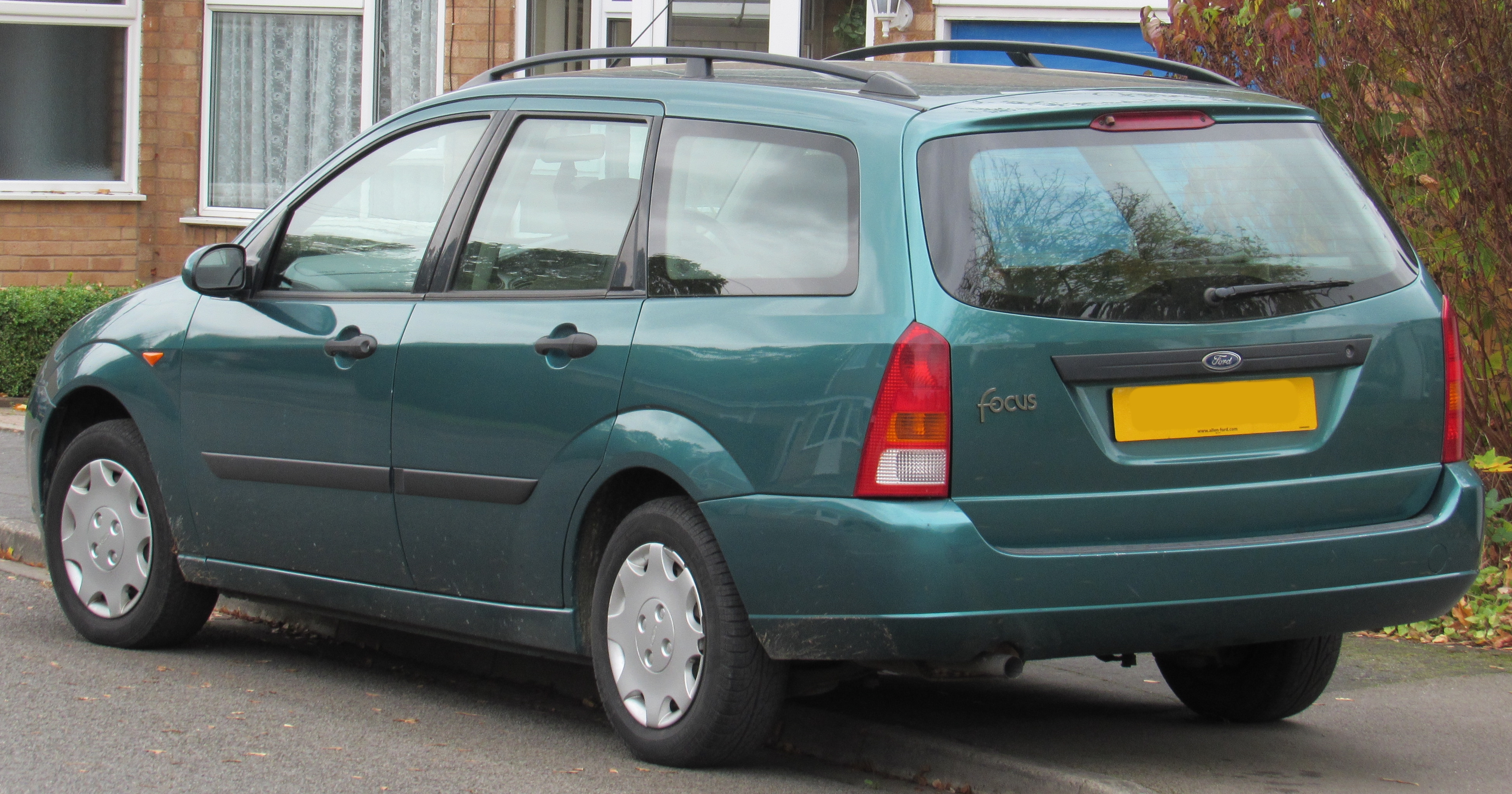
Estate (facelift)

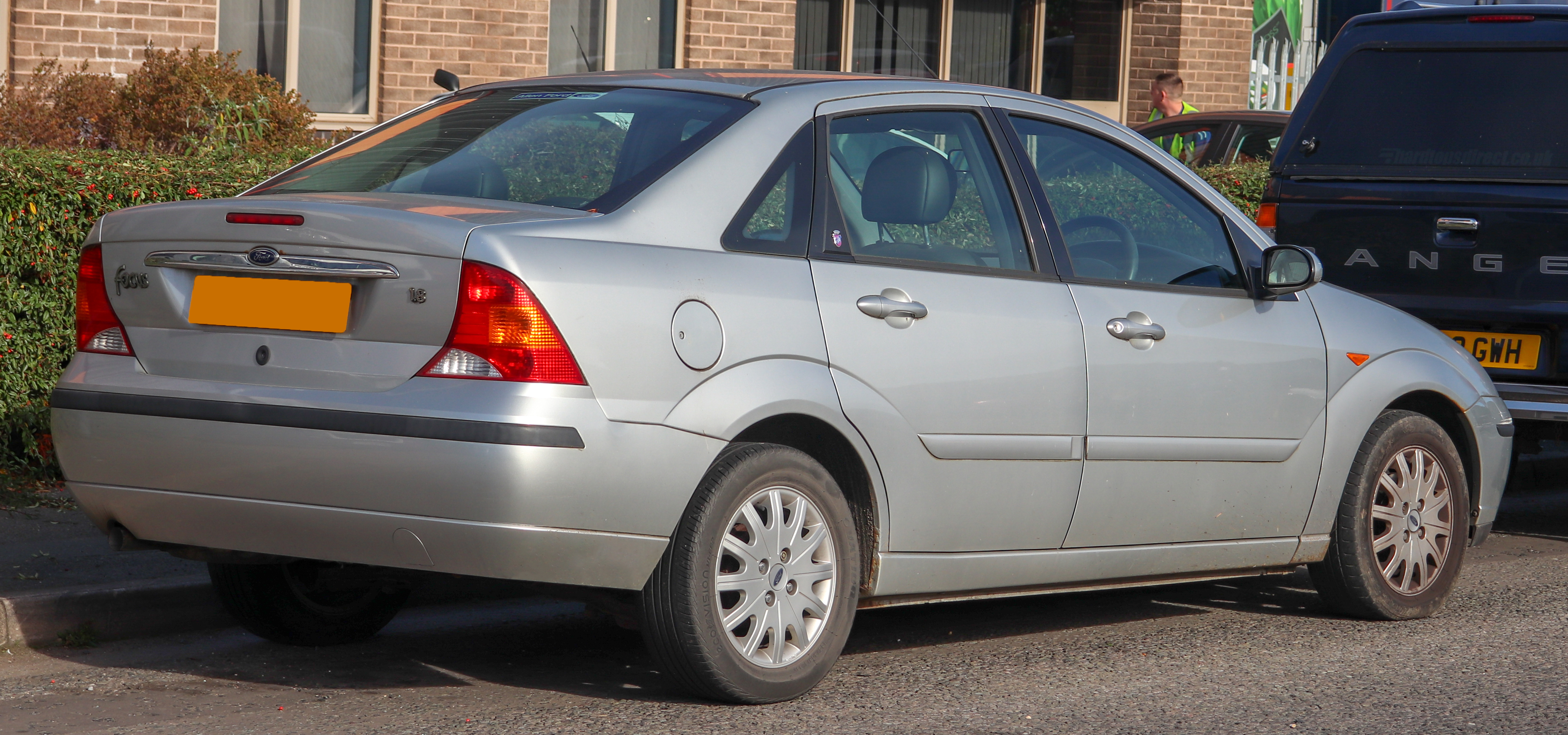
Saloon (facelift)

The Mk 1 Focus facelift in late 2001 included:

- Revised headlamps with integrated indicators and separate main and dipped bulbs
- Revised bumpers without indicators, but with the addition of removable bump strips
- Revised upper and lower grille and fog lights
- Optional Xenon headlights
- Optional 6-disc CD changer
- Optional Navigation System
- Optional Digital Climate Control
- Features of certain trim levels changed
- Modified center console with rubber cup holders
- Different center dash colors
- New seat trims
- Different instrument cluster finishes
- Damped and lit glovebox
- New colors
- Rear power point
- TDCi Engine introduced to the range
- Versatility Pack Option added
- Bluetooth camera facility

A new flexfuel engine was introduced, based on the European Zetec 1.6 L version. This could use both gasoline and bioethanol, but was only available on the Swedish market. This version is still available in some countries despite the advent of an all-new Mk 2 Focus.

=== North America (2000–2007) ===
Ford Focus (North America)
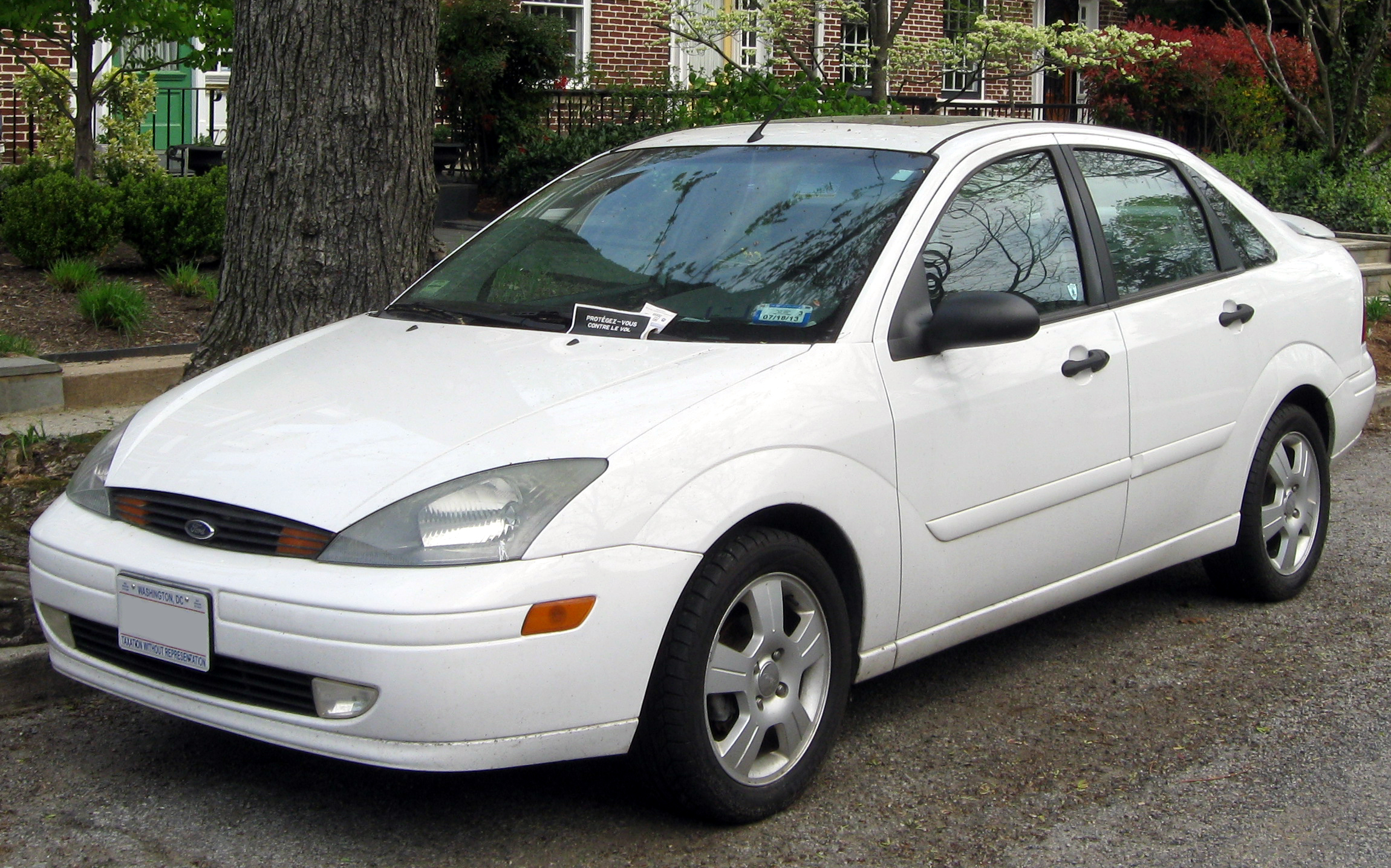

Overview
- Production: September 1999–2007
- Model years: 2000–2007
- Assembly: United States: Wayne, Michigan; Mexico: Hermosillo, Sonora

Body and chassis
- Body style: 3-door hatchback 4-door sedan 5-door hatchback 5-door station wagon

Powertrain
- Engine: 2.0 L CVH I4; 2.0 L Zetec I4; 2.0 L Duratec HE I4; 2.3 L Duratec HE I4
- Transmission: 4-speed 4F27E automatic 5-speed iB5 manual 5-speed MTX-75 manual

Dimensions
- Wheelbase: 102.9 in (2,614 mm) (2005–2007); 103 in (2,616 mm) (2000–2004)
- Length: 168.1 in (4,270 mm) (2000–2004 hatchbacks); 168.5 in (4,280 mm) (2005–2007 hatchbacks); 174.9 in (4,442 mm) (SE); 175.2 in (4,450 mm) (ZX4); 178.2 in (4,526 mm) (2000–2004 wagon); 178.4 in (4,531 mm) (2005–2007 wagon)
- Width: 66.7 in (1,694 mm) (2005–2007); 66.9 in (1,699 mm) (2000–2004)
- Height: 56.3 in (1,430 mm) (2000–2004 hatchback & sedan); 56.8 in (1,443 mm) (2005–2007 hatchback & sedan); 53.9 in (1,369 mm) (2000–2004 wagon); 57.5 in (1,460 mm) (2005–2007 wagon)
- Curb weight: 2,564–2,759 lb (1,163–1,251 kg)

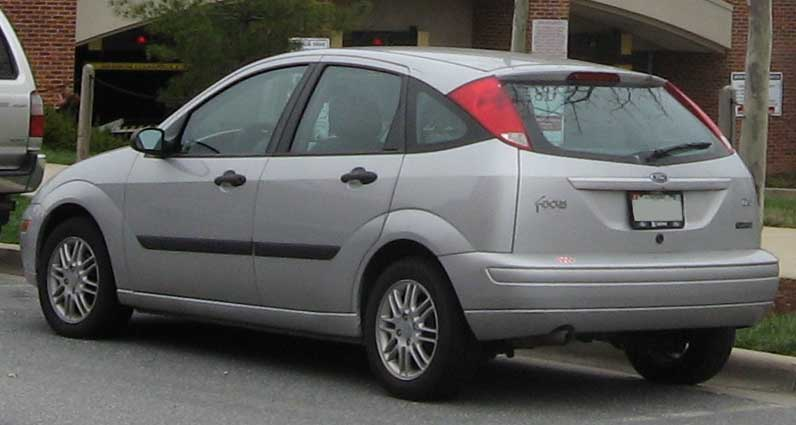
2002–2004 Ford Focus ZX5

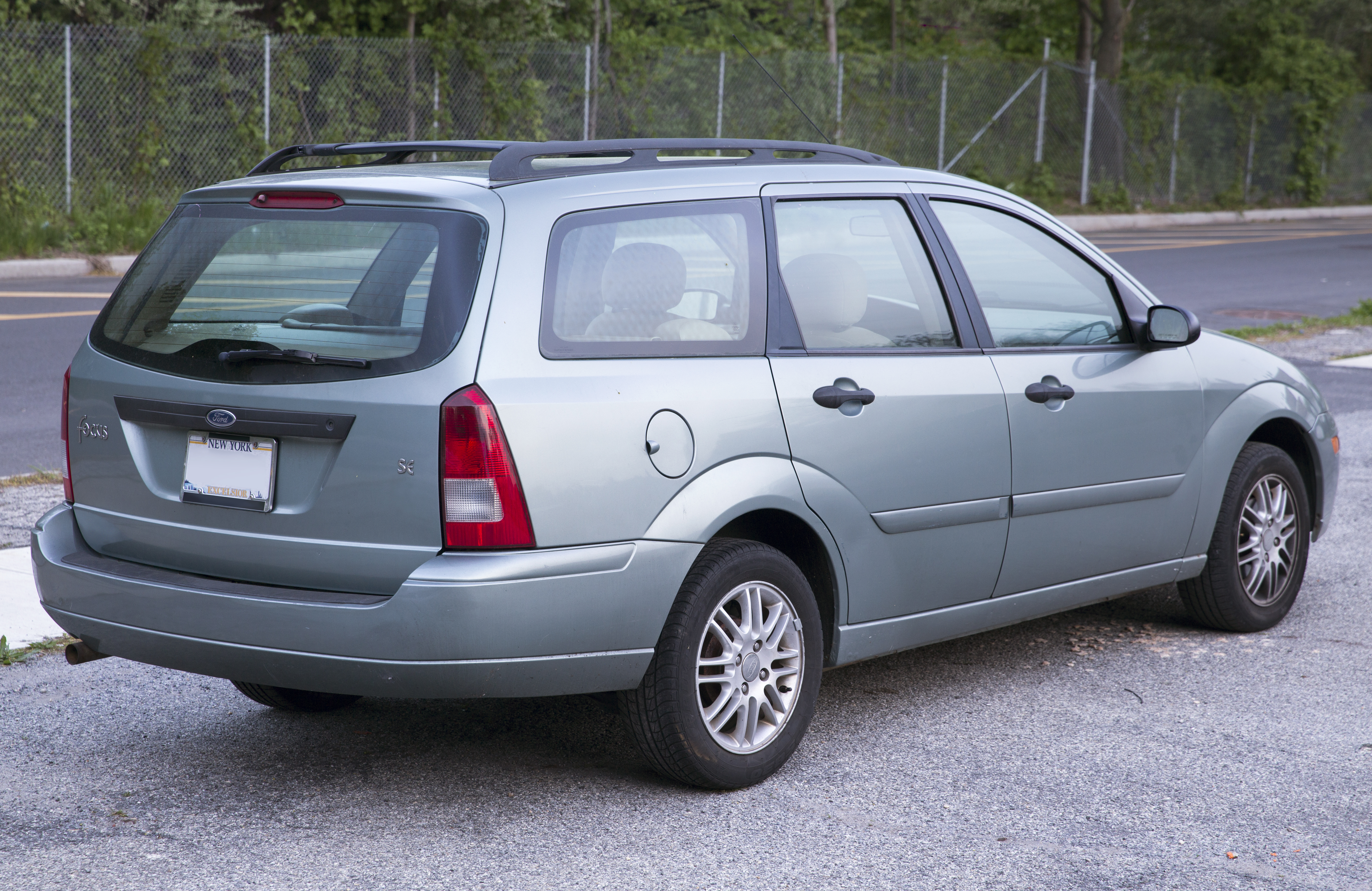
2003 Ford Focus SE wagon (pre-facelift)

Ford began marketing the Focus in October 1999 for the 2000 model year initially as a 3-door hatchback, 4-door sedan and 5-door wagon – with a 5-door hatchback debuting for the 2002 model year at the Canadian International AutoShow in Toronto. The Focus became one of the ten best-selling cars in America shortly after its introduction.

==== Model year changes ====
- 2000 MY – Introduction of the Sony Limited Edition, Street Edition, Kona Editions.
- 2001 MY – available electronic stability control, marketed as "AdvanceTrac," standard fog lamps on ZTS Series, new 6-spoke 16-inch aluminum wheels now standard on ZTS Sedan, front armrest now standard on SE Sedan and Wagon, comfort Group now includes only tilt/telescoping wheel, speed control, and front map lights on SE Sedan and Wagon (no longer includes front center armrest), power windows standard on SE Sedan and SE Wagon, SE Sport Group upgraded to include leather-wrapped steering wheel, single CD now standard on SE Sedan and Wagon, new manual moon roof available on ZX3, front and rear floor mats and smoker's package now standard on all models, new premium group (incl. air conditioning, 16-inch aluminum wheels and tires, tilt/telescoping wheel, front center armrest, speed control, front map lights) available on ZX3, manual transmission available on SE Wagon (as a delete option), power group includes power locks with all-door remote entry, power windows, and power mirrors – now available on ZX3, Zetec Engine now standard on SE Wagon. Introduction of the S2 Edition.
- 2002 MY – Introduction of the ZX5 5-door hatchback, power moon-roof available for the first time on all body styles, available 6-Disc In-dash CD Changer, improved cup holders to accept larger cups, added rear-seat map pocket on LX, SE, ZX3, and kangaroo pouches on ZTS, and the ZTW trim level for the wagon – including the 2.0L DOHC Zetec I-4 engine, leather seating surfaces, driver's side lumbar support, six-disc in-dash CD player, tilt/telescoping steering wheel, remote key-less entry, power windows and door locks, electronic speed control and air conditioning. In 2002, all Focus models received a safety package, marketed as the Personal Safety System – which included an electronic crash severity sensor, restraint control module, dual-stage driver and right front passenger airbags, dual-threshold driver and right front passenger airbags, driver's seat position sensor, front outboard safety belt energy management retractors, front outboard safety belt pretensioners, front outboard safety belt usage sensors. Introduction of the Mach Audio Edition. Introduction of the SVT models.
- 2003 MY – ZX5 now available in three trim levels, two new interior fabrics, heated front seat and heated mirror option, available traction control and ABS package, gray headlamp surrounds, silver instrument cluster and color-keyed trim on premium trims, CD/MP3 audio player standard on ZX3, ZX5, redesigned 16-inch alloy wheels, optional perimeter alarm, improved interior noise level, recalibrated throttle, refinement of 110 hp (82 kW) engine. Introduction of the Centennial Edition in celebration of Ford's 100th anniversary.
- 2004 MY – The new 2.3 L I4 Duratec engine previously only available in select states became available nationwide, ZX3 now available with leather seating surfaces, new steering knuckles and struts for improved ride and handling, discontinuation of optional electronic stability control.

Facelift

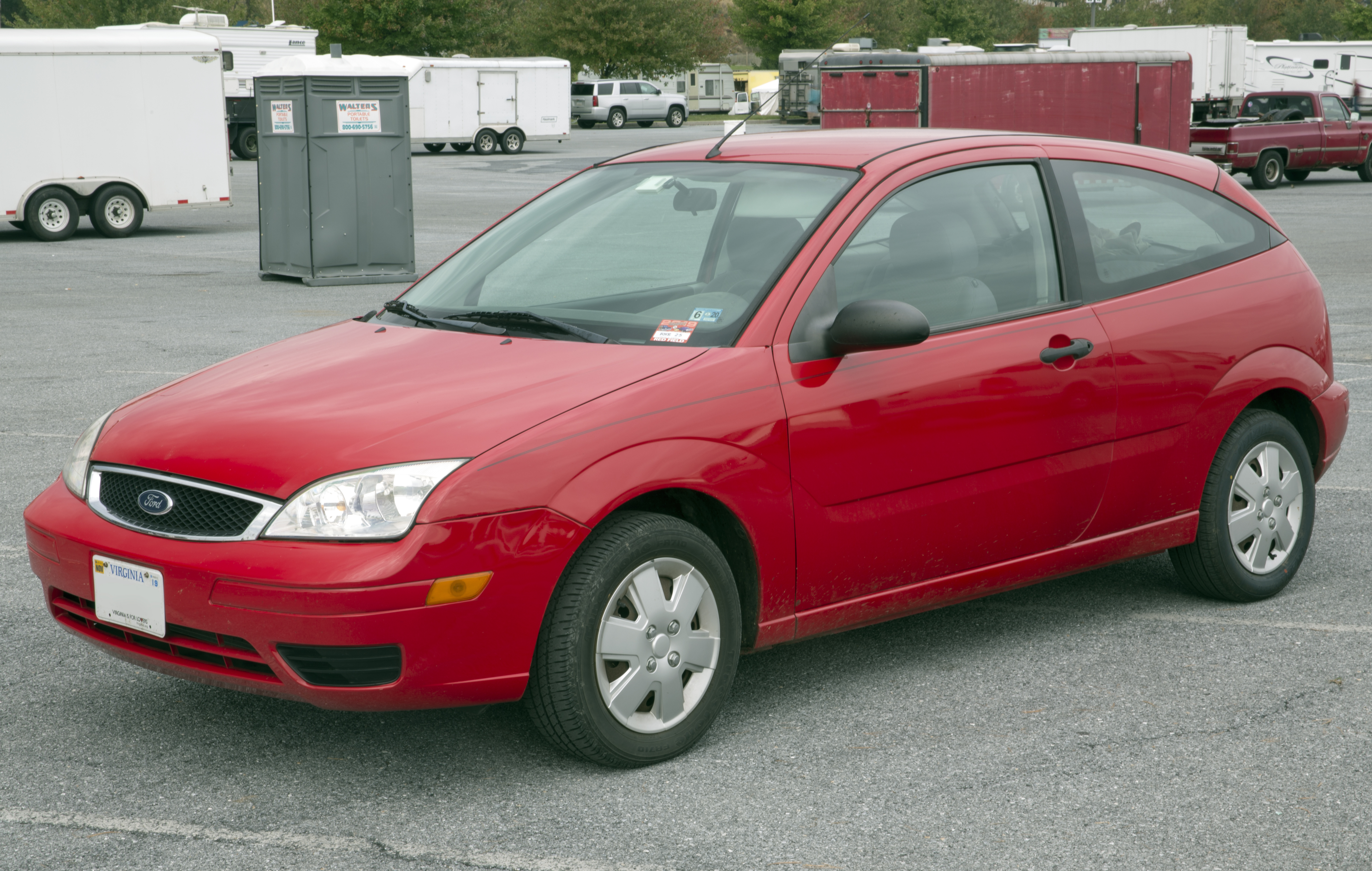
2007 Ford Focus ZX3 SE (facelift)

- 2005 MY – (mid-cycle facelift) While the European Focus was replaced by a second generation, the North American Focus received styling and engineering changes developed under Focus Chief Engineer John Sidelko and Focus designer Larry Erickson. With the 2005 model year, Ford introduced the ST model of the ZX4 sedan (replacing the SVT models of the ZX3 and ZX5), and the Focus nomenclature was revised to combine a body-style designation (ZX4, ZX3, ZX5 and ZXW – with tail badges) with a trim designation (S, SE or SES – the latter two carrying respective tail badges). Styling revisions included a new front bumper facia, a revised instrument panel, new tail lamps and a new rear bumper fascia on sedan models, a new harder steel alloy used for the hood, an 11% thicker plastic bumper fascia, a storage drawer for six compact discs located by the driver's left knee, optional overhead console with sunglasses holder and space for a garage door opener, molded-in beverage holders in the front door pockets, 15-inch (380 mm) steel wheels and all-season tires, instead of 14-inch (360 mm) on entry trim level models, (now designated S), and new brake linings with total brake swept area increased by 17 percent.

Engines included a 136 hp (101 kW), 2.0-liter (120 cu in) Duratec 20 dual-overhead-cam, inline-four cylinder engine (PZEV models have 10mm lift and much lower 2 Deg overlap camshafts to reduce NOX emissions, lowering HP to 127hp) replacing both the base 110 hp (82 kW), 2.0-liter (120 cu in) single-overhead-cam inline-four and the 130 hp (97 kW) 2.0-liter (120 cu in) Zetec DOHC inline-four, while a 151 hp (113 kW) 2.3-liter (140 cu in) Duratec 23 DOHC inline-four engine derived from the Duratec 20 family was available in all 50 states for the ZX4 ST. The Duratec 23 has a larger displacement and performance-tuned exhaust, while in California, New York, Massachusetts, Vermont and Maine, the Duratec 23E was also available, qualifying the Focus as a Partial Zero Emissions Vehicle (PZEV). Manual transmission was now listed as standard equipment rather than a delete option on wagons.

- 2006 MY – On ZX4, ZX3 and ZX5, standard CD/MP3 player on all models, S and SE models receive revised plastic wheel covers with alloy wheels now available as a standalone option, six-disc audio systems now have steering-wheel controls, convenience Package and Safety Packages bundle popular options. Also in 2006 Ford introduced the Street Appearance Package priced at US$1295 with two unique front and rear fascia choices. The front fascia included integrated fog lamps and side markers, while the rear offers a rear diffuser, with the option of a large rally-style spoiler.
- 2007 MY – models no longer carried body configuration (ZX3, ZX4, ZX5, ZXW) tail badges, modifications increased EPA mileage ratings, new leather-trimmed sport seats with contrasting leather inserts, new exterior colors: Kiwi Green and Aqua Blue Clearcoat Metallic, available Street Appearance Package I with rally-style rear deck lid spoiler, single-disc CD and MP3 capable player now standard on all series, available six-disc CD and MP3 capable player now includes duplicate audio controls on steering column, new Interior Upgrade Package. Wagon production ends at the end of the 2007 calendar year.

==== Body styles and trims ====
| Year | Model | Avail. trims levels/packages |
|---|---|---|
| 2000 | 3-door Hatchback | ZX3, Kona Edition |
| 2000 | 4-door Sedan | LX, SE & ZTS |
| 2000 | Wagon | SE |
| 2001 | 3-door Hatchback | ZX3, S2 |
| 2001 | 4-door Sedan | LX, SE & ZTS, Street Edition |
| 2001 | Wagon | SE, Street Edition |
| 2002 | 3-door Hatchback | ZX3, SVT, S2 |
| 2002 | 4-door Sedan | LX, SE & ZTS |
| 2002 | Wagon | SE & ZTW (New for 2002 MY) |
| 2002 | 5-door Hatchback (New for 2002 MY) | ZX5 |
| 2003 | 3-door Hatchback | ZX3, SVT |
| 2003 | 4-door Sedan | LX, SE, ZTS, & Centennial Edition |
| 2003 | Wagon | SE & ZTW |
| 2003 | 5-door Hatchback | ZX5 in Base, SVT, Comfort & Premium (New for 2003 MY) |
| 2004 | 3-door Hatchback | ZX3, SVT |
| 2004 | 4-door Sedan | LX, SE & ZTS |
| 2004 | Wagon | SE & ZTW |
| 2004 | 5-door Hatchback | ZX5 in Base, SVT, Comfort & Premium |
| 2005 | ZX4 (4-door Sedan) | S, SE, SES & ST |
| 2005 | ZX3 (3-door Hatchback) | S, SE & SES |
| 2005 | ZX5 (5-door Hatchback) | S, SE & SES |
| 2005 | ZXW (Wagon) | SE, SES |
| 2006 | ZX4 (4-door Sedan) | S, SE, SES & ST |
| 2006 | ZX3 (3-door Hatchback) | S, SE & SES |
| 2006 | ZX5 (5-door Hatchback) | S, SE & SES |
| 2006 | ZXW (Wagon) | SE, SES |
| 2007 | ZX4 (4-door Sedan) | S, SE, SES & ST |
| 2007 | ZX3 (3-door Hatchback) | S, SE & SES |
| 2007 | ZX5 (5-door Hatchback) | S, SE & SES |
| 2007 | ZXW (Wagon) | SE, SES |

On 2005 and 2006 models in the US and Canada, the second generation Focus received a body-configuration badging (e.g., ZX3, ZX4, ZX5, ZXW) along with separate badging to designate trim levels SE and SES trim; there was no trim badge for the S trim level. The body configuration badging were deleted from the liftgates/trunklids of 2007 models, the trim badging remained.

2005–2007 trim designations

- Focus S: (ZX3, ZX4 and ZX5), Duratec 20 or 20E engine with five-speed manual transmission, manual driver's seat height adjustment, split-folding rear seat, AM/FM single CD player, 15-inch wheels, Dual-stage driver and front-passenger air bags.
- Focus SE: (ZX3, ZX4, ZX5 and ZXW) Included S content, plus air conditioning, overhead console, AM/FM stereo with single-disc CD/MP3 player, dual power mirrors, power windows and locks, remote keyless entry.
- Focus SES: (ZX3, ZX4, ZX5 and ZXW) Included SE content, plus tilt/telescoping leather-wrapped steering wheel, tachometer, decklid spoiler, and 16-inch alloy wheels.
- Focus ZX4 ST: Included SES content, plus Duratec 23 engine with sport-tuned exhaust, ST suspension with unique 16-inch alloy wheels, fog lamps, four-wheel antilock disc brakes, chrome-tipped exhaust, body-color, heated outside mirrors, leather-wrapped steering wheel and shift knob with contrast stitching, unique sport-trimmed interior fabrics and instrument panel.

==== Debut marketing ====
Targeting Generation X and Generation Y in the Focus marketing campaign at its North American introduction, Ford created a now defunct youth-destination website (www.focus247.com), aired 64 live television spots featuring comedian Annabelle Gurwitch beginning September 6, 1999, during the MTV Video Music Awards, featured the Focus in co-sponsoring Ricky Martin's Livin La Vida Loca North American tour (September 1999), and developed a strategic partnership with the WB Network show Dawson's Creek – including a private live concert event (November 1999), featuring of the Focus in two Dawson's Creek episodes, and a Focus signed by the Dawson's Creek cast auctioned on Amazon.com.

In January 2001, Ford partnered with Atom Films and J. Walter Thompson (now JWT) to create three short films featuring the Ford Focus. Costing $80,000 the films were later shown at the Sundance Film Festival and on Atom Films' web site. In "Little Man on Campus," the lead male, undersized, uncoordinated, who had trouble living up to his father's hopes, gets a Ford Focus from his parents and then makes a varsity sports team, wins 'the girl' and finally carries a squad of cheerleaders in the Focus. The film features a cameo appearance by Barry Livingston, who played "Ernie" in the TV show My Three Sons. Another of the films was titled "The Kiss." The third film entitled "gulp" and by director Jason Reitman was selected to premiere in the 'Official Sundance Screening Room'. The film depicted the efforts of a young man to save his tropical fish. All three films were available for viewing at a now defunct web site, www.focusinfilm.com.

Marketing packages At introduction, Ford offered five specialized packages for the Focus targeting the youth market marketed as Tailored For You kits, allowing buyers to customize their car's interior:

- The Pet Package (also called the Have Spot, Will Travel kit) included custom car bed, insulated pet sport bottle, lint roller, integrated pockets for leashes, a foldable bowl, air purifier, and pet safety belt.
- The Professional Package (also marketed as the Mobile Pro kit) included a voice-recorder, illuminated notepad holder, pocket for cellular phone/pager storage, and a mobile work station consisting of a tray to hold laptop, paper, pencils and supplies.
- The Sports Package included a backpack that slid over the back of the front seat and a customized roof rack.
- The Express Yourself Package included customized decals, steering wheel cover, gear shift knob on manual models, and special seat covers in neoprene, fleece or jersey
- The Friends Package included the features of the Express Yourself Package along with a coordinated ice cooler, and candy dispenser.

==== Special editions ====
Sony: Ford marketed 7000 examples of the Sony Limited Edition in January 2000 featuring an AM/FM CD receiver with wireless remote, four red and black three-way speakers (one pair in each door), trunk mounted 10-inch subwoofer. Exterior colors were Rainforest Green, Infra-Red, Pitch Black, and Going Platinum, each with an MSRP of $15,535.
Kona: the Kona Mountain Bike Edition (May 2000, 5000 examples), featuring an "Out of Bounds" Kona bike, bolt-on bike rack, nylon washable seat covers, unique colors Dirt Metallic and Rainforest Green, unique side moldings with molded-in Kona Moto logo and bike tire treads; 16-inch six-spoke machined aluminum wheels and heavy-duty black rubber floor mats, also with Kona Moto logo and bike tire treads

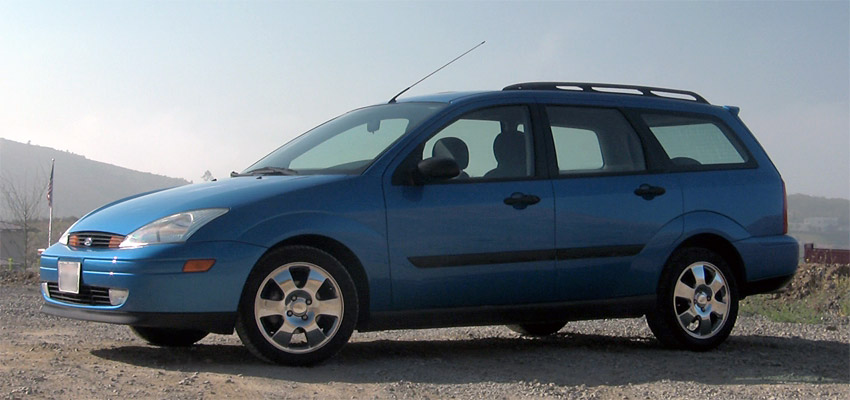
Ford Focus Street Edition

Street: the Street Edition (September 2000) with European suspension, black trim, 16-inch polished aluminum wheels, a 6-disc CD changer, leather-wrapped steering wheel. On the exterior, the front chin, rocker panels, bodyside moldings and lower rear fascia were black, while exterior colors were Infra-Red, Egg Yolk Yellow and Malibu Blue. The models used same springs, dampers and anti-roll bars found in the European Focus. Interior details included sport bucket seats with diamond, silver-masked instrument cluster, radio bezel, door accents and a silver shift knob. 7,500 total Street Editions were manufactured, approximately 85 percent of them were made as sedans ($15,750 MSRP), the remaining models as wagons ($17,745 MSRP).
S2: The Focus S2 (2001), available only in the three-door ZX3 model, featured European-tuned suspension, grey body trim with unique front spoiler and rocker panels, color-keyed bodyside moldings and S2 badging, rear spoiler, six-spoke 16-inch aluminum wheels and chrome exhaust tip, six-disc in-dash CD changer, sport bucket seats with diamond-patterned inserts, and exterior colors including CD silver, Sangria Red and a Focus Liquid Grey.
Mach Audio: The Focus MACH Audio ZTS sedan featured an audio system with six-disc in-dash CD changer, four 5 x 7-inch door-mounted, two-way speakers, a 10-inch dual-voice coil subwoofer, equalization customized to the Focus' interior configuration and 460 watts unique silver-faced instrument cluster, mesh seat fabrics and door trim panels, six-spoke, machined-aluminum wheels, MACH Audio badging, chrome HID projector headlamps, exterior colors of CD Silver, Liquid Grey and Mandarin Copper, and an MSRP of $16,975.
Centennial: In celebration of its 100th anniversary on December 20, 2002, Ford marketed 3000 examples of the Ford Focus Centennial Edition, each a 2003 four-door sedan with black paint, 16-inch aluminum wheels; rear spoiler, fog lamps, leather-wrapped steering wheel with tilt and telescoping column, AM/FM Stereo with CD and MP3 player, driver's seat lumbar support, premium Verona-grain Imola leather seating surfaces in two-tone parchment, Ford 100th Anniversary deck lid and side badges, a commemorative key chain and watch, a copy of the limited edition coffee table book "The Ford Century," and a black leather owner's guide portfolio with the embossed signatures of Henry Ford, his son Edsel Ford, Henry Ford II, and William Clay Ford, Jr.

==== Aftermarket ====
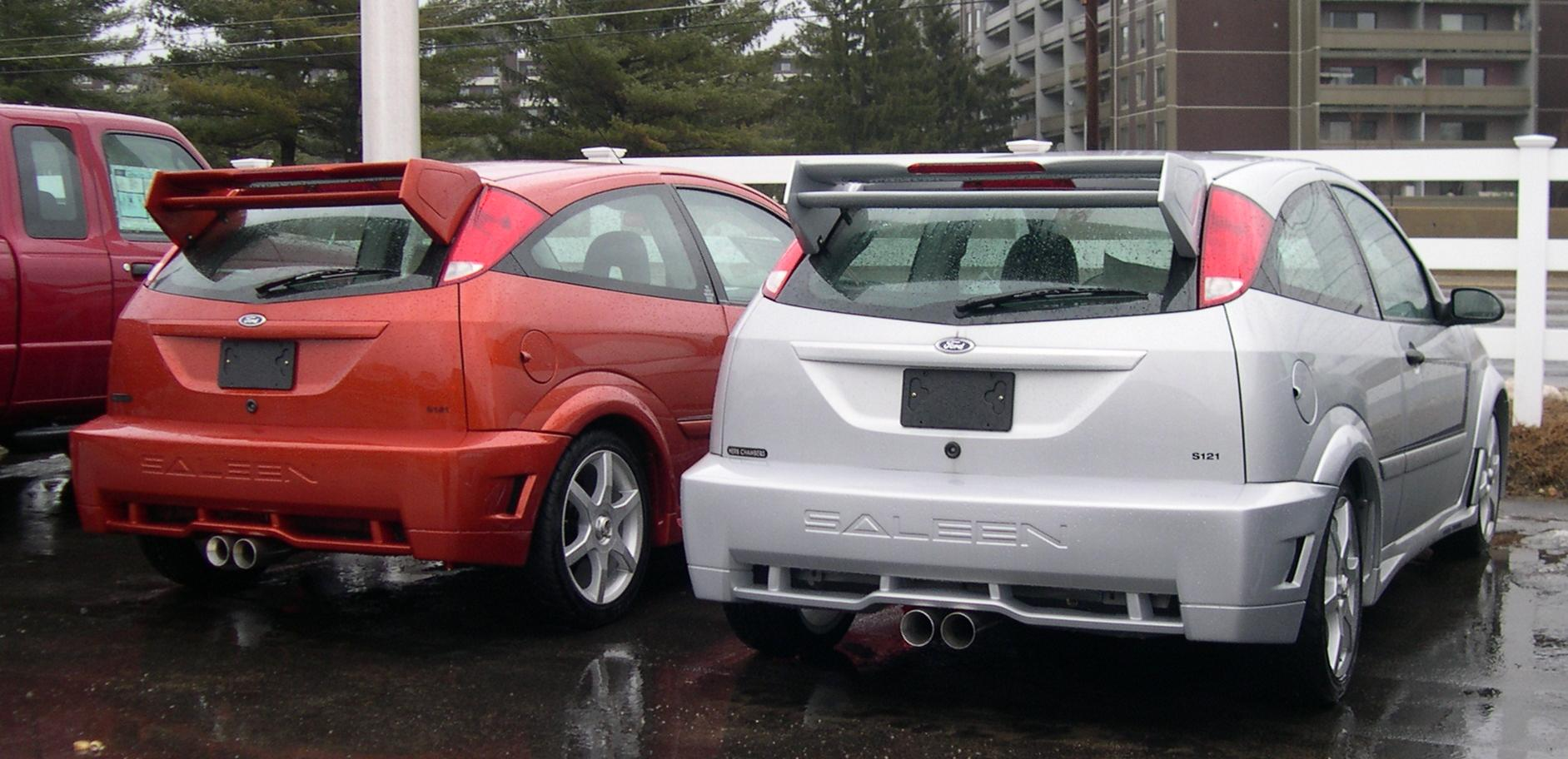
Two Saleen S121s.

Tuner Saleen modified the first generation USA Focus into the S121 and N20 performance cars. The S121 includes a 138 hp (103 kW) Duratec 2.0L I4 engine with improved suspension, custom body work designed and CAD modeled by Phil Frank, custom graphics, tire and wheel package, customized interior components, and optional upgraded brakes. The 10% performance boost to the factory Duratec 2.0l I4 engine was achieved by replacing the factory paper air filter with a more freely flowing reusable air cleaner and by replacing the factory exhaust with a cat back exhaust system. The N20 offers the same base engine and other improvements along with a factory installed nitrous oxide system that offers a 75 hp (56 kW) boost bringing the N2O to 225 hp (168 kW). The S121/N2O are sold as new at many Ford dealers. There were 200 S121/N2O's produced by Saleen in 2005.

Several American companies offer genuine Ford parts to modify North American built Focuses to full or partial European standards. There is also a V8 engine conversion for the Focus.

=== South America ===
The Mark 1 Focus remained in production until 2008 in General Pacheco, Argentina for the South American Market. The last of the Mark 1 Focus produced in Argentina (2008 Version) featured either a 1.6 L Zetec RoCam Flex Fuel engine, a 2.0 L Duratec HE engine, or the 1.8 L Duratorq Diesel Engine. Assembly of the Mark 2 Focus started in 2008 for the 2009 model.

However, in Brazil, Ford do Brasil offered this until 2009, in 1.6 (Flex Fuel - 105 PS gasoline/112 PS ethanol) GL or GLX hatchback or saloon versions.

==== Trim levels (South America) ====
- GL (2000–2003) - 1.8 gasoline, 118 hp (87 kW), 5-door hatchback, 4-door saloon.
- GL (2004–2007) - 1.6 gasoline, 106 hp (78 kW), 5-door hatchback, 4-door saloon.
- GL (2007–2008) - 1.6 flexfuel, 112 hp (82 kW), 5-door hatchback, 4-door saloon.
- GLX (2000–2004) - 1.8 gasoline, 118 hp (87 kW), or 2.0 gasoline, 130 hp (96 kW), 5-door hatchback, 4-door saloon.
- GLX (2005–2008) - 1.6 flexfuel, 112 hp (82 kW), or 2.0 gasoline, 145 hp (107 kW), 5-door hatchback, 4-door saloon.
- XR (2003) - 2.0 gasoline, 126 hp (93 kW), 5-door hatchback.
- Ghia (2000–2004) - 2.0 gasoline, 130 hp (96 kW), 5-door hatchback, 4-door saloon.
- Ghia (2005–2008) - 2.0 gasoline, 145 hp (107 kW), 5-door hatchback, 4-door saloon.

== Safety ==
The Mk 1 Ford Focus received 4 out of 5 stars for occupant safety, and 2 out of 4 stars for pedestrian safety in its Euro NCAP tests (69% frontal, 83% side, 28% pedestrian). In Australia, the 2002–2005 Ford Focus was assessed in the Used Car Safety Ratings 2006 as providing "average" protection for its occupants in the event of a crash. The car scored 11.6 points out of 16 in a frontal crash test conducted by the Russian ARCAP safety assessment program in 2003.

ANCAP test results* Ford Focus (2002)
| Test | Score |
|---|---|
| Overall | 4 /5 stars |
| Frontal offset | 10.59/16 |
| Side impact | 14.56/16 |
| Pole | Not Assessed |
| Seat belt reminders | 0/3 |
| Whiplash protection | Not Assessed |
| Pedestrian protection | Not Assessed |
| Electronic stability control | Optional |

== Engines ==
=== European introduction ===
Gasoline engines available were the well-proven 1.8 L and 2.0 L Zetec units from the Ford Mondeo and 1.4 L and 1.6 L versions of the Zetec-S/SE units, also found in the Ford Fiesta and Ford Puma. The ST170 and RS performance models used modified versions of the 2.0 L Zetec. Originally, the only diesel engine available was the Endura TDDI (a development of the old Deutz-designed motor which Ford had been using since the 1980s). This was replaced in 2002 by the Duratorq TDCI.

=== International summary ===
| Size (L) | Name | Fuel | Market | Power (kW/bhp/PS) | Torque | MPG, l/100 km | Top Speed | 0-62 mph (0–100 km/h) (S) |
|---|---|---|---|---|---|---|---|---|
Petrol engines
| 1.4 | Zetec-S/SE | Gasoline | Europe | 55/74/75 | 123 N⋅m (91 lb⋅ft) | 42.2, 6,7 | 106 mph (171 km/h) | 14.1 |
| 1.6 | Zetec-S/SE | Gasoline | Europe | 74/100/101 (SE 99) | 145 N⋅m (107 lb⋅ft) | 37.4, 7,6 | 115 mph (185 km/h) | 10.9 |
| 1.6 | Zetec-Rocam | Gasoline/ethanol (Flex) | Brazil | 81.5/109/111 (ethanol) | | | | |
| 1.8 | Zetec-R | Gasoline | Europe, Brazil | 84/113/114 | 160 N⋅m (118 lb⋅ft) | 33.8, 8,4 | 123 mph (198 km/h) | 10.3 |
| 2.0 | Zetec-R | Gasoline | Europe, Brazil | 96/127/130 | 174 N⋅m (128 lb⋅ft) | 31.6, 8,9 | 125 mph (201 km/h) | 9.2 |
| 2.0 | Duratec HE | Gasoline | Brazil | 109/146/148 | 172 N⋅m (127 lb⋅ft) | 31.6, 8,9 | 128 mph (206 km/h) | 8.8 |
| 2.0 | Duratec-ST | Gasoline | Europe | 127/167/170 | 196 N⋅m (145 lb⋅ft) | 31.0, 9,1 | 136 mph (219 km/h) | 7.9 |
| 2.0 T | Duratec-RS | Gasoline | Europe | 158/212/215 | 310 N⋅m (229 lb⋅ft) | 27.9, 10,9 | 149 mph (240 km/h) | 6.4 (Torque Limited) |
Diesel engines
| 1.8 | TDDi 75 | Diesel | Europe | 55/74/75 | 175 N⋅m (129 lb⋅ft) | 55.4, 5,1 | 104 mph (167 km/h) | 14.7 |
| 1.8 | TDDi 90 | Diesel | Europe | 66/89/90 | 200 N⋅m (148 lb⋅ft) | 52.4, 5,4 | 112 mph (180 km/h) | 12.4 |
| 1.8 | TDCi 100 | Diesel | Europe | 74/99/100 | 240 N⋅m (177 lb⋅ft) | 52.4, 5,4 | 116 mph (187 km/h) | 11.7 |
| 1.8 | TDCi 115 | Diesel | Europe | 85/114/115 | 250 N⋅m (184 lb⋅ft) | 52.4, 5,4 | 122 mph (196 km/h) | 10.7 |

=== North America ===
| Engine | Power | Torque | Found on |
|---|---|---|---|
| 2.0 L CVH/SPI | 110 hp (82 kW) | 125 lb⋅ft (169 N⋅m) | Standard in LX and SE model sedans through 2004. Standard in wagons for 2000 model year. |
| 2.0 L Zetec-E | 130 hp (97 kW) | 135 lb⋅ft (183 N⋅m) | Standard on ZX3, ZX5, ZTS, and wagon models after 2000 model year, and available in SE-model sedans through 2004. |
| 2.0 L Zetec-R | 170 hp (127 kW) | 145 lb⋅ft (197 N⋅m) | Standard on the SVT Focus. |
| 2.3 L Duratec | 145 hp (108 kW) | 149 lb⋅ft (202 N⋅m) | PZEV engine, optional in 2003 in California, Massachusetts, New York, Vermont, and Maine; optional in all US states in 2004. Optional OEM header for AIR Emission and 7.8mm Lift camshafts. |
| 2.0 L Duratec | 136 hp (101 kW) | 133 lb⋅ft (180 N⋅m) | Standard on the (non-ST) 2005–2007 Focus. |
| 2.0 L Duratec | 140 hp (100 kW) | 136 lb⋅ft (184 N⋅m) | Standard on all models 2008+ Focus 8.25mm/7.75mm lift camshafts . |
| 2.0 L Duratec | 130 hp (97 kW) | 129 lb⋅ft (175 N⋅m) | 20E PZEV, All models except ST, required in CA, MA, ME, NY, VT, available in AZ, CT, NY, NJ, NV, OR, PA, RI. 2005–2007 Focus. Updated 10mm lift, 2 Deg overlap to reduce NOX emissions used on PZEV models . |
| 2.3 L Duratec | 151 hp (113 kW) | 154 lb⋅ft (209 N⋅m) | Standard on the 2005–2007 Focus ST. |

== Transmissions ==
=== Europe ===
- 5-speed MTX-75 manual (2.0, RS & 1.8 TDCi, 1.8 TDDi, 1.6)
- 5-speed IB5+ manual (2.0 SPI USA Only)
- 5-speed IB5 manual (1.4, 1.6, 1.8)
- 6-speed Getrag 285 manual (ST170)
- 4-speed 4F27E automatic (1.6, 2.0)

=== North America ===
- 5-speed MTX-75 manual (ST)
- 5-speed IB5 manual
- 6-speed Getrag MT285 manual (SVT)
- 4-speed 4F27E automatic (Zetec, Split Port and Duratec)

== Performance versions ==
=== SVT models ===
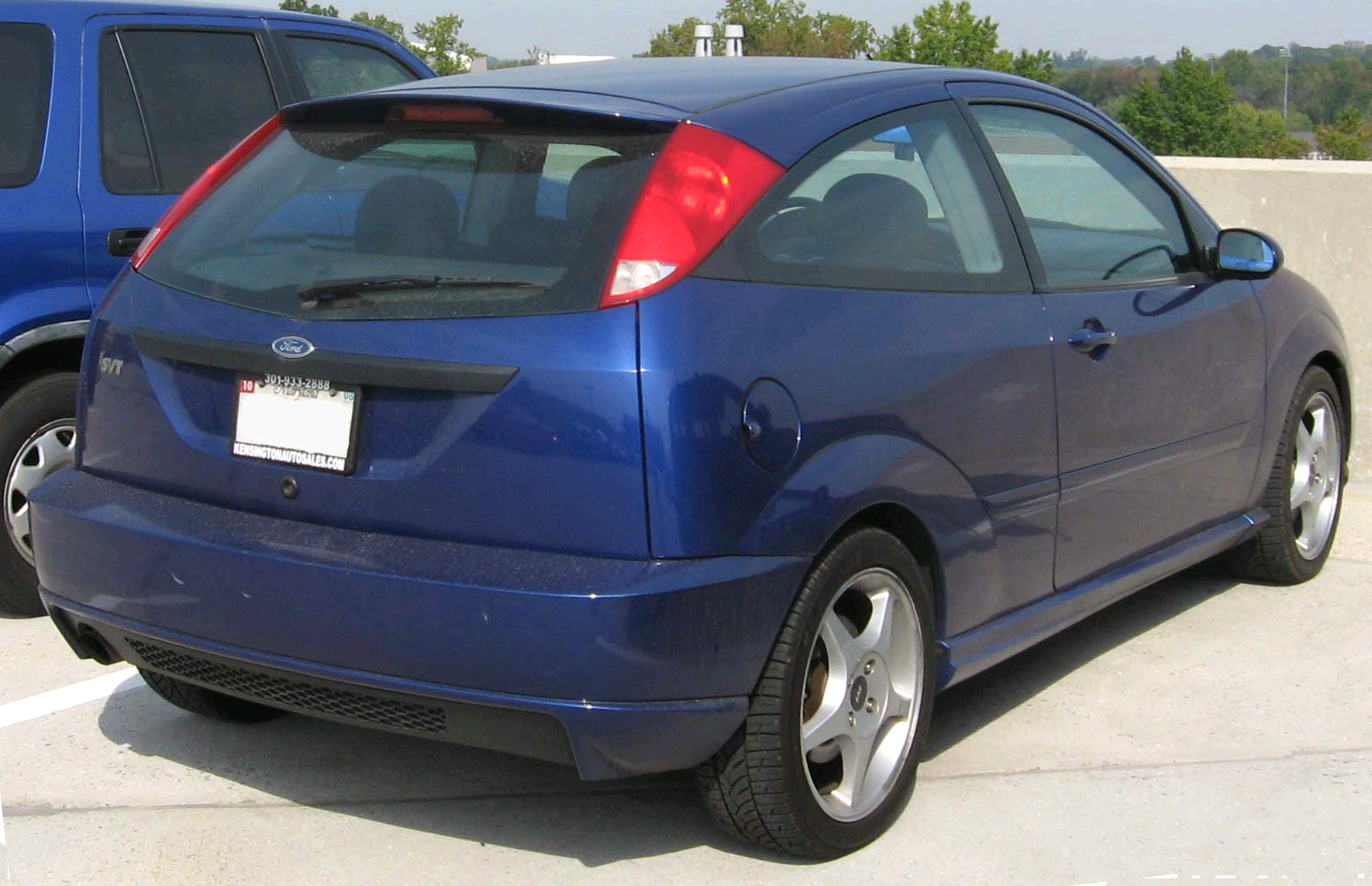
Ford SVT Focus 3-door

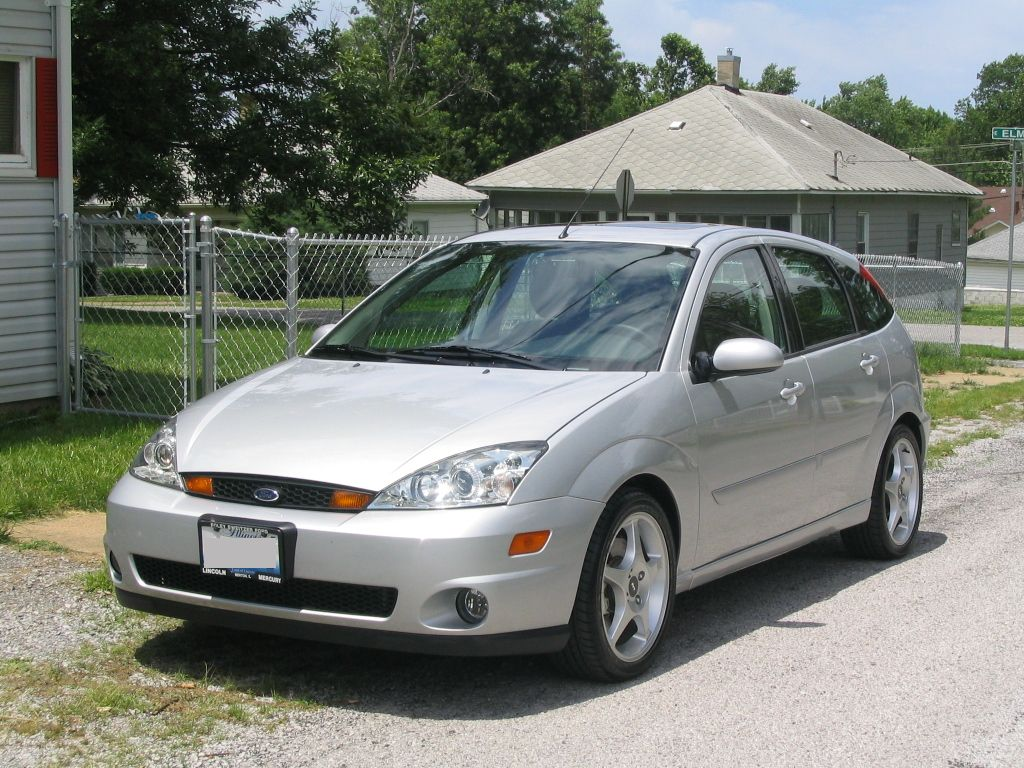
Ford SVT Focus 5-door

In late 2001, Ford's in-house performance group, Special Vehicle Team (SVT), introduced the three-door Focus ZX3 SVT (ST170) to the United States and Canadian markets for the 2002 model year. The exterior included revised front and rear bumper fascias, side skirts, fog lamps, rear diffuser, hatch lip spoiler, and 17-inch (430 mm) 5-spoke alloy wheels wearing fairly sticky "Y" rated 215/45R17 tires from Continental. The SVT also featured a reworked version of the 2.0-liter Zetec engine available in other Focus models. Developed in concert with Cosworth, this engine featured a special aluminum cylinder head with enlarged intake ports, high compression pistons and forged connecting rods, piston oil squirters, solenoid operated variable camshaft timing on the intake cam, dual stage intake manifold, and a 4-2-1 tubular exhaust header.

These additions, coupled with an increased 10.2:1 compression ratio, increased power from 130 to 170 horsepower (97 to 127 kW). Getrag provided a six-speed manual transmission shared with the Mini Cooper S. This transmission was a twin layshaft design and included a dual mass flywheel to eliminate vibration and transmission noise. Other changes to complete the package included sharper steering through an increased boost ratio in the steering rack, larger disc brakes on all four corners with standard ABS (300mm front/280mm rear,) and stiffened suspension with a slightly larger rear anti-roll bar. Exterior color choices were limited to CD Silver, Infra-Red Tintcoat, Sonic Blue, and Pitch Black.

Interior features included two-tone leather/cloth seats with Infra-Red/Sonic Blue cloth seat/door inserts, perforated leather steering wheel, perforated leather shift knob with leather boot, as well as a perforated leather emergency-brake handle and leather boot. Options for the Focus SVT included a one-touch sliding power glass sunroof, seven-speaker Audiophile sound system with 8-inch (200 mm) sub-woofer, a Cold Weather package (includes heated seats/outside mirrors, traction control, and a 115 V block heater,) and, for 2003 and 2004 models, HID xenon headlamps.

In 2003, the SVT was offered in an all-new five-door ZX5 SVT counterpart and an exclusive European Appearance Package available for the ZX3 SVT only. The European Appearance package (or EAP for short) included all available options listed above, plus full black perforated leather Recaro seats/door panels and fifteen-spoke Dark Argent colored wheels. The exterior was available in two new exclusive EAP colors, Screamin' Yellow and Competition Orange. The only options not available on the 2003–2004 ZX5 SVT were the EAP for 2003 or the side skirts. In 2004, the Focus SVT's final year of production, the Euro package was available in the ZX5 SVT model as well. The base 5-spoke "Cobra R" wheel design would be replaced by a 6-spoke design similar to the ones found on the Steeda Focus as the base wheel option, the 2004 EAP would retain the Dark Argent 15-spoke design. The Focus SVT would be replaced by the 2005 Focus ZX4 ST Sedan.

Focus SVT production
| Model year | ZX3 | ZX5 | Subtotal |
|---|---|---|---|
| 2002 | 4,788 | — | 4,788 |
| 2003 | 3,985 | 2,173 | 6,158 |
| 2004 | 1,978 | 1,079 | 3,057 |
| Totals | 10,751 | 3,252 | 14,003 |

=== ST model ===
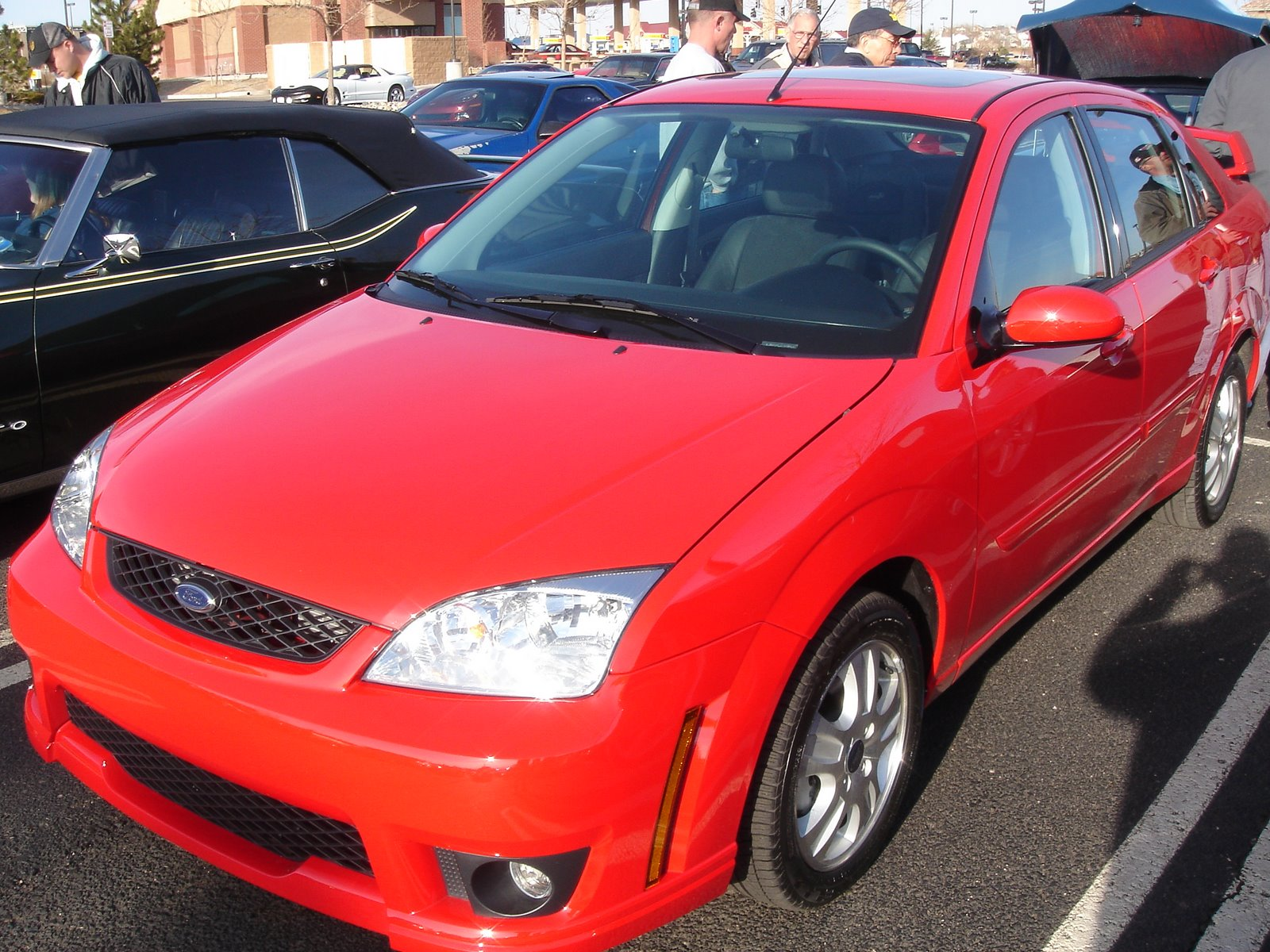

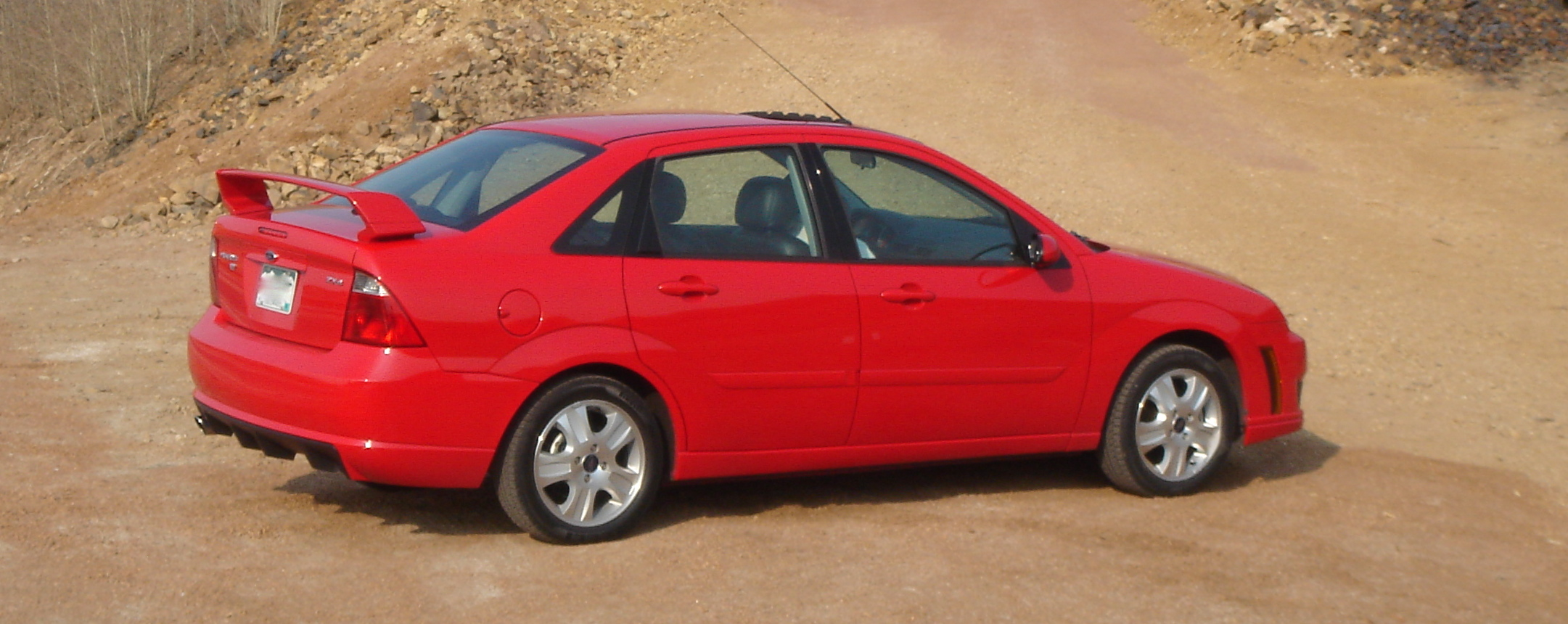
2006 Ford Focus ST with "Street Appearance" package.

Following discontinuation of the North American SVT Focus in 2004, Ford introduced the ST variant of the ZX4 for 2005–2007, with a 2.3-liter, 151 hp (113 kW) (154 lbf⋅ft (209 N⋅m) (SAE) Torque) Duratec driving a five-speed MTX-75 manual transmission with reverse lock-out. Though power was lower than the SVT, acceleration was only slightly lower due to a higher differential ratio. The 2005 ST used dampers and stabilizer bars similar to those of the SVT, but significantly softer springs. The ST featured a unique interior, 16-inch (410 mm) wheels with Pirelli P6 Four Seasons tires, spoiler, color-keyed fascia, a color keyed grille, and four-wheel anti-lock disk brakes. The 2005 ST included all SES package equipment – with heated seats, heated mirrors, leather interior, moonroof, and Audiophile package controlled by a Blaupunkt headunit all optional. 2007 was the final year for the 2.3 L engine in the Focus. For the 2006 and 2007 ST's the suspension geometry was changed to provide a softer ride.

In Canada, the Street Appearance look was available and named the GFX package. The Focus ST name did return in 2012 in an all new model.

Total Production:14464

2005: 9329

2006: 2419

2007: 2716

=== ST170 ===
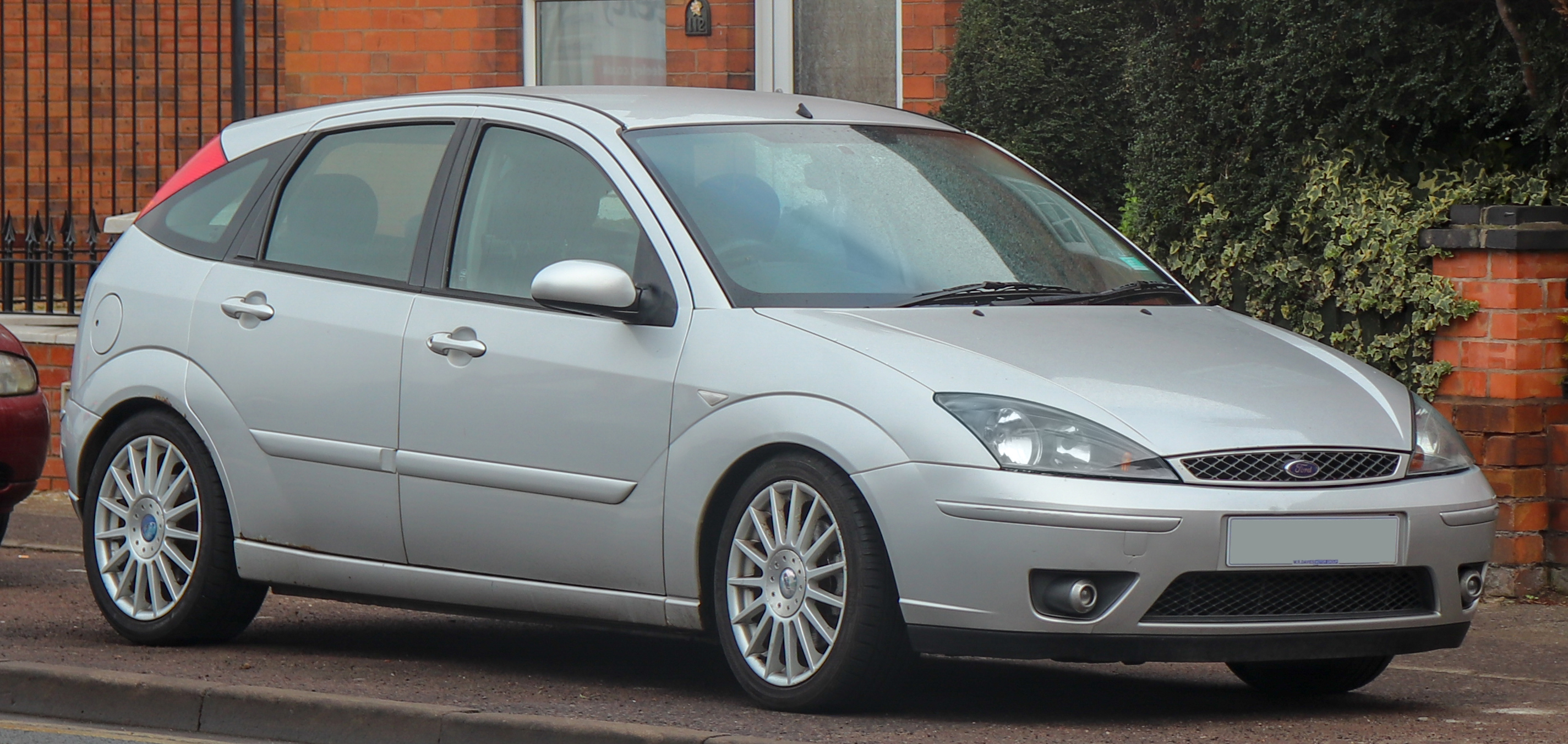

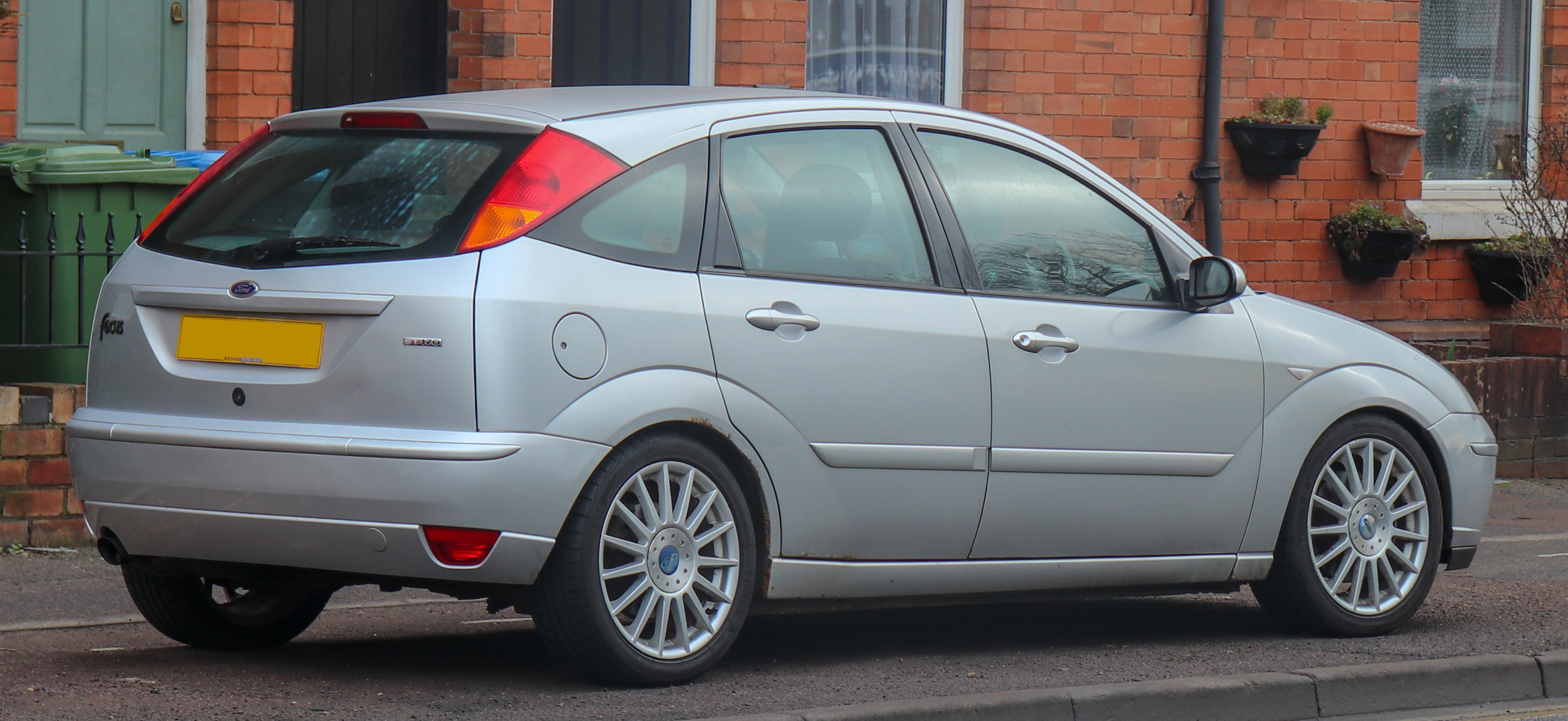
Ford Focus ST170 Moondust Silver

The ST170 (codename Piranha), which was launched in 2002, was the first Focus sport model to be developed for international markets by a joint SVE/SVT global team. Adapted from the Facelift Mk 1 Focus, the ST170 had the following cosmetic revisions: 17 in (430 mm) Multi-Spoke Alloy Wheels; Alarm; Side Airbags; Optional 1/2 (in non-UK markets) and full Recaro leather seats; Optional 9006 Stereo system with bespoke Subwoofer; brushed aluminium door releases; honeycomb 'tech flec' front grills, round projector style fog lights, color-coded bumper and side beadings & door handles; and Locally developed bodykit (Australia only). The 172.3PS engine was developed by Cosworth and tuning bumped the power from 127 to 170 horsepower (95 to 127 kW). Upgrades included: High-flow aluminium cylinder head; Variable valve timing; Dual stage intake manifold; Stainless steel exhaust system and exhaust manifold by Cosworth; Sports catalytic converter; Larger brake discs (300 mm front, 280 mm rear); Getrag 6-speed manual M6 gearbox; Revised power steering 'falling-flow' pump and close ratio steering rack. Black Oak engine management system. The engine was sourced from the Ford of Mexico Chihuahua plant. The vehicle final-assembly was in the Ford Saarlouis plant in Germany, with some content such as the subwoofer assembled off-line at the ACÜ facility attached to the plant. There was an additional Wagon/Estate variant (codename Swordfish) launched in Europe-only in 2003, which featured Nivomat self-levelling rear dampers.

=== RS ===
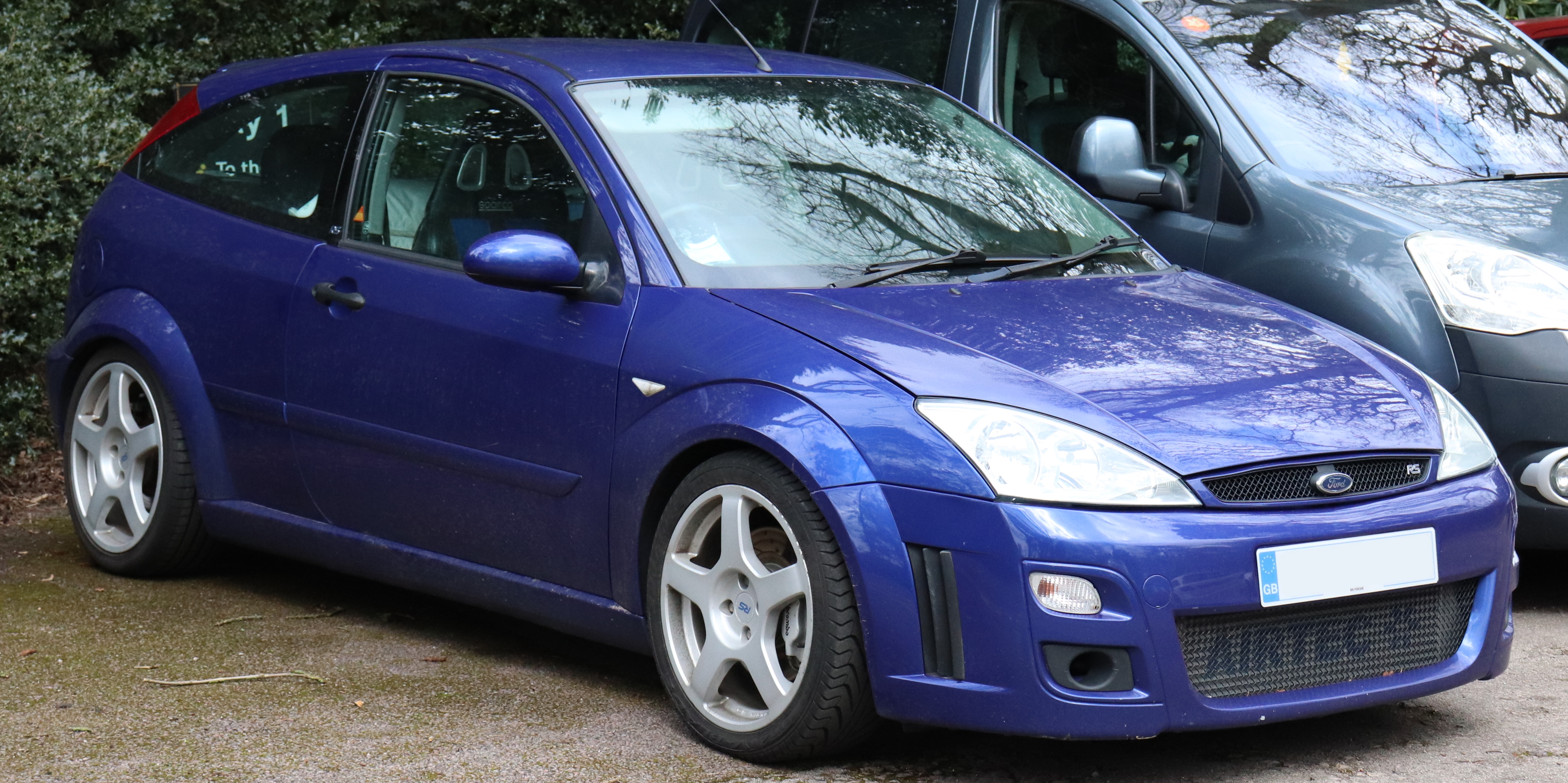
Focus RS

The Focus RS Mk1 was produced from October 2, 2002, to November 11, 2003, and was Ford's return to the RS (Rallye Sport) badge after the demise of the tweaked Escorts, particularly the fabled Ford Escort RS Cosworth. Production was limited to 4501 units only. The car was largely built on its own assembly line in Ford's Saarlouis plant, with some additional specialist off-line assembly performed by the ACÜ group at Überhern. The RS was offered all over Europe, but 2147 were sold in the United Kingdom, by far its largest market. The Mark 1 Focus RS was a limited production run available in 21 European countries. Prior to the launch of the production car, there were 12 development prototypes, which were then followed by 26 pre-production vehicles.

Using a turbocharged version of the 2.0-liter Ford Zeta engine, the Focus RS rated at 212 horsepower (158 kW).

It would generate a steady 0.98G in lateral acceleration due to racing parts such as Sachs dampers, lightweight O.Z Alloy Wheels and a Quaife ATB Differential. It would also allow 1.0G of braking force due to the standard Brembo braking system 324 mm (Front) 280 mm (Rear).

The development of the Focus RS was undertaken by a mixed team of mainstream Ford engineers (not SVE nor the TeamRS group which replaced it later on) and Tickford Engineering in Milton Keynes, United Kingdom. Originally it was to be released as the Racing Focus, however after the poor selling Racing Puma, Ford (driven by Martin Leach) decided to revive the RS badge.

More bespoke than the concurrent Ford Focus SVT (badged as the Focus ST170 in Europe), the Focus RS upgraded or replaced 70% of the standard Focus mechanicals. The 1,998 cc (2.0 L; 121.9 cu in) straight-four engine equipped with a single Garrett AiResearch GT25 (60) SG turbocharger produced a minimum of 215 PS (158 kW; 212 hp) at 5500 rpm and 310 N⋅m (229 lb⋅ft) of torque at 3500 rpm, which was then mated to the 5-speed Ford MTX-75 transmission and not the Getrag used in the ST 170. Mechanically, most notably, the car incorporated a Quaife automatic torque biasing differential to improve traction from the front-wheel drive setup. The steering used a similar quick-ratio rack as the ST170 while the brakes used fixed-caliper, four-piston Brembo units with 324 mm (12.8 in) discs at the front and single-piston floating calipers and 280 mm (11.0 in) discs at the back. Wheels were 18" alloys specially developed by OZ Racing. The engine was heavily modified with forged aluminium pistons, hardened valve seats, sodium-filled exhaust valves, stainless steel exhaust system. The forced induction system comprised a Garrett turbocharger with a water-cooled charge air cooler and an electric water pump. To transmit the higher torque an upgraded AP clutch was used.

The Focus RS was available in one metallic color, Imperial Blue. The body looked similar to the standard Focus or to the ST170, although the RS featured unique front and rear bumper assemblies required for the wider wheel arches which accommodated the 65 mm (2.6 in) wider front track. Internally, the theme is blue and black with sections of blue leather trim on the door trim panels, the steering wheel and the Sparco seats which were trimmed in blue/black leather and Alcantara. A green starter button starts the engine. The instruments have a blue background and in place of the coolant temperature gauge, the RS was equipped with a boost pressure indicator (up to 1.5 bar). The gear lever knob, handbrake lever, and pedals were all custom made by Sparco.

All-around performance was roughly equal or better to its other competitors, including hatchbacks such as the Honda Civic Type R and some four-wheel drive cars in the same price field. Power was a diminished priority and the handling on a track, courtesy of the front differential, was considered by most observers to be its strongest characteristic. In a Top Gear review, Jeremy Clarkson noted that "it lacks the straightforward oomph of a Subaru Impreza. [...] The reason it was quick round our track is simple: this car handles like it's in a cartoon." Clarkson and other motor journalists also commented on the car's torque steer on bumpy British roads.

=== Cosworth Concept ===
Ford Motor Company made acquisition in 1998 of its longtime partner Cosworth Racing and was exploring the return of the Cosworth badge on their production cars. At the 1999 Geneva International Motor Show Ford represent concept model named Focus Cosworth. It was inspired by 1999 Ford Focus WRC with unique bodykit and powered by a Cosworth-developed 2.0-liter turbo-charged and inter-cooled Zetec-E engine that produce more than 200 PS.

== Focus RS WRC ==
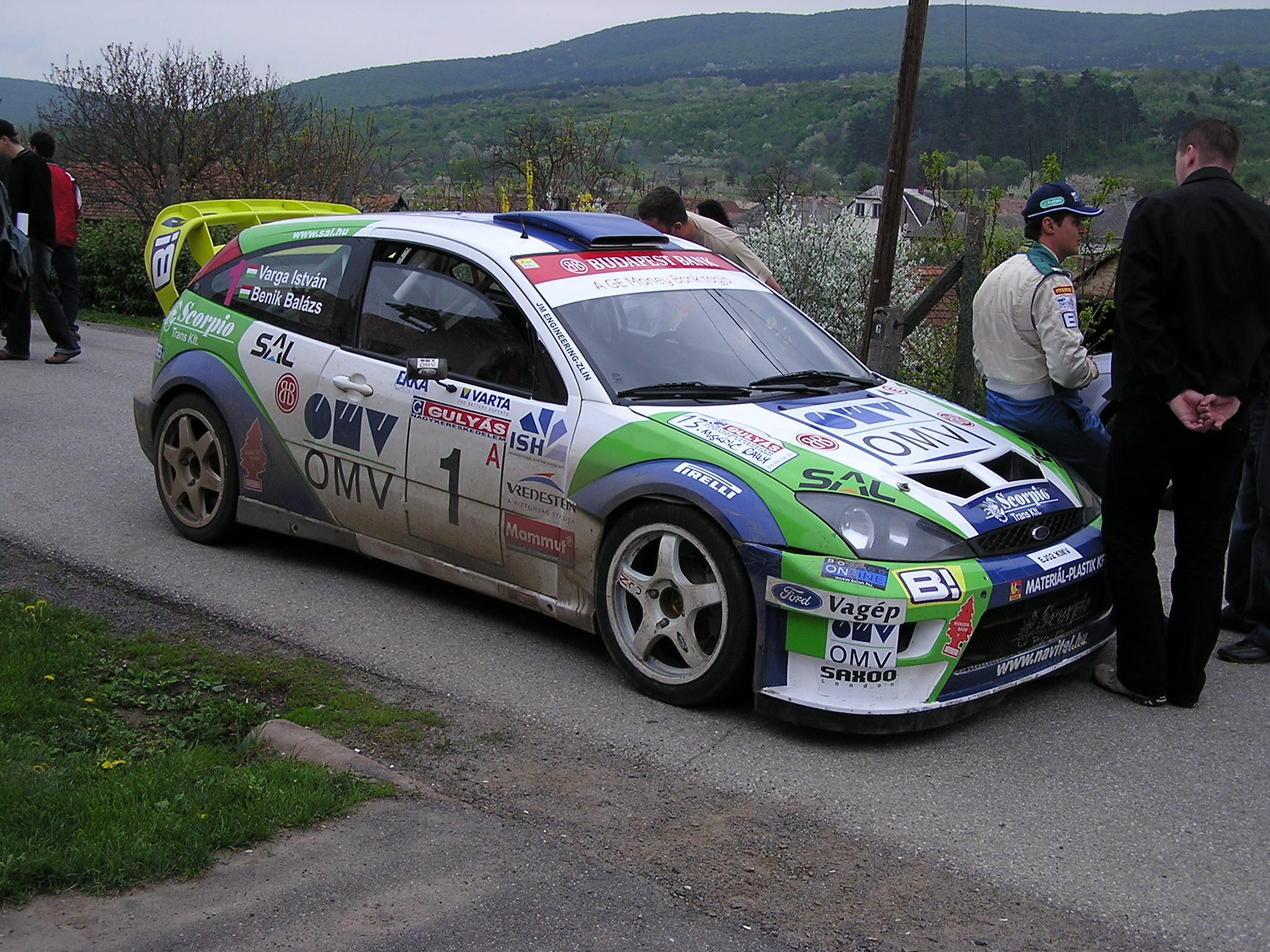
Ford Focus RS Mk1 WRC

The Focus RS WRC was built in 1999 to replace the Ford Escort WRC. It debuted in the Monte Carlo Rally with Colin McRae and Simon Jean-Joseph behind the wheels of the two cars. It was immediately on the pace, setting many fastest stage times, but the use of an illegal water pump meant that the two cars were excluded from the event. McRae gave the Focus its first win two events later on the Safari Rally Kenya finishing over 15 minutes ahead of the second placed Toyota of Didier Auriol.

In 2003, Ford released a newly designed Focus WRC, named Focus RS WRC 03, for competition during the second part of the season. The car, with most parts redesigned from the ground up, featured a lighter body shell and a new aerodynamically enhanced front bumper and wing. Markko Märtin drove the car to two world rally victories. The 2004 and 2005 Focus WRCs were evolutions based on the RS WRC 03. The Focus RS WRC 04 won three events with Märtin at the wheel. By 2005, the car was no longer competitive and Ford had a winless season.

== Overall sales and history ==
In Europe, the hatchback is the biggest selling bodystyle. Ford attempted to market the saloon in Europe as a mini-executive car by only offering it in the Ghia trim level, something that it had tried before with the Orion of the 1980s. It has since given up on this strategy, and has started selling lower specified versions of the saloon.

Despite its radical styling (the hatchback version in particular), and some controversial safety recalls in North America, the car was a runaway success across the globe, even in the United States, where Ford had traditionally failed to successfully sell its European models. In Europe, where the Focus was positioned at the heart of the largest market segment by volume, Ford's overall market share had declined by 25% between 1995 and 2000 as the aging Ford Escort failed to match up in technological terms to the Vauxhall/Opel Astra and Volkswagen Golf without being able to achieve compensating sales volumes in the low price sector where Korean manufacturers, in particular, were becoming increasingly competitive. The Focus stopped the rot for Ford in Europe, selling particularly strongly in the UK. This was the best-selling car in the world in 1999 through 2004. It was elected European Car of the Year in 1999, ahead of GM's new Astra model. The Focus won the North American Car of the Year award for 2000.

Both versions of the Focus have been the 1999 and 2005 Semperit Irish Car of the Year In Ireland.

The Focus, unlike the Escort, was never offered in a dedicated panel van body style; however, a commercial Focus based on the 3-door hatch is available in Europe - most commonly in Ireland.

Ford therefore continued the Escort Van until the purpose-designed Transit Connect was introduced in 2002 as its replacement. A convertible version was another notable omission that was rectified with the Mk2 Coupe-Cabriolet.

The European Focus, in 2002, according to German reports and surveys, was claimed to be the most reliable car between one and three years old in the German car market.

== Awards and recalls ==
Since its launch in 1998, the first generation Focus has won over 60 awards including 13 Car of the Year awards in both Europe and North America, and more recently, the best family car ever (Autocar UK 2003). In 2000, the Focus won Automobile magazine's Automobile of the Year and MotorWeek's Best Small Car.

Though the Focus received the R.L. Polk & Co. Automotive Loyalty Award for highest percentage of repeat buyers, four years running, from 2000 through 2003 – the Focus did experience numerous recalls early in the car's life. Despite Lemon-Aid describing it as "glitch ridden" up until 2004, Focus reliability steadily improved.

By 2005, the Focus received a Consumers Digest Best Buy Rating, (taking numerous factors into consideration, including reliability and recall history) as well as the Strategic Vision 2005 Total Quality Award. In 2006 the Focus received AutoPacific's first Ideal Vehicle Award as top-rated compact car for 2006.

The Focus placed on Car and Driver magazine's Ten Best list for five consecutive years between 2000 and 2004.
