= Ford MTX-75 transmission =

5-speed automotive transmission

The Ford MTX-75 (Manual TransaXle) is a 5-speed transmission developed by Ford Motor Company for its larger-engined front wheel drive models. "75" refers to the distance in millimeters between the main and lay shafts.

== History ==
Debuting in 1992, the transmission was developed in tandem with the Zetec family of engines. The transmission is optimised for transferring larger levels of torque than the older iB-series unit used on the Fiesta and Escort models. Other features include the provision of equal length driveshafts (to combat torque steer) and synchromesh on reverse gear.

The transmission was first used on the Zetec-engined Escort Mk V (only XR3i), but its proper intended application was on the Mondeo and its derivatives (the American Ford Contour, Mercury Mystique and the New Edge Mercury/Ford Cougar). The 2000-2004 Focus with 2.0 litre Zetec engine, and the 2.3 liter Duratec engine with manual used this transmission, as well as all diesel powered versions of the Focus. With slight differences it was used on the 2005-2007 Focus 2.0L and 2.3L Duratec engines, and 2008-2018 Focus with 2.0L Duratec engiines. It was also used in the 2.5 and 3.0 V6 versions of the manual transmission equipped Jaguar X-Type.

The main change to the unit was to cable operation in 1996 on the facelifted Mondeo, as the rod-based linkage of the original unit attracted criticism for feeling vague and notchy.

The open differential can be replaced by a plated or ATB Differential for motorsport use - Kaaz, Torsen, MFactory and Quaife offer suitable units.

== VXT-75 ==
The VXT-75 gearbox is a modified version of the MTX-75, used in the Galaxy (1995–2006) and Transit (2000–) models.

== See also ==
- List of Ford transmissions
