= Richard Parry-Jones =

British automobile designer (1951–2021)

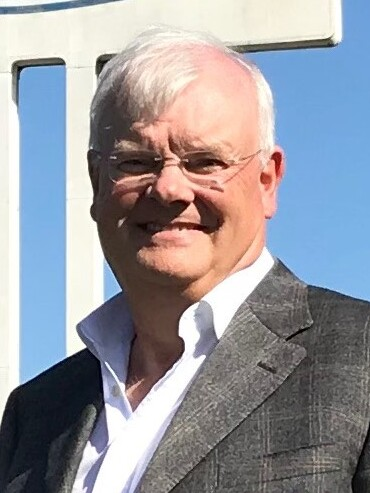
- Parry-Jones in 2020
- Born: 15 September 1951; Bangor, Wales
- Died: 16 April 2021 (aged 69); Barmouth, Wales
- Spouses: Hilary Gater (m. 1973; div. 2008); Sara Price
- Children: 3
- Engineering career
- Awards: Fellow of both the Royal Academy of Engineering, and the Institution of Mechanical Engineers; Man of the Year, 1994, Autocar; Man of the Year, 1997, Automobile Magazine

Richard Parry-Jones CBE FREng (15 September 1951 – 16 April 2021) was a British engineer. He was the Group Vice-President of Global Product Development, Chief Technical Officer, and Head of Global R&D Operations at Ford Motor Company. He retired in December 2007.

Parry-Jones directed the concurrent development of dozens of vehicles at Ford and significantly influenced vehicles including the 1993 Ford Mondeo, both the 1998 International Ford Focus and 2000 North American Ford Focus, the European 1981 Escort and 1983 Sierra, as well as the Ka, Fiesta, Puma, Cougar, and Galaxy.

Parry-Jones oversaw product development for Ford vehicles worldwide, as well as design, research and vehicle technology. As Chief Technical Officer, he reported to the company's board of directors on technical matters, headed a technical staff of 30,000 engineers, scientists, designers and business professionals in North America, Europe, Latin America and the Asia-Pacific region, including the Ford, Lincoln, Jaguar, Volvo, Land Rover, and Aston Martin brands.

Responsible for product safety and environmental initiatives at Ford, his work included follow-up work on the company's response to problems that arose through its use of Firestone tyres on Ford Explorer SUVs. He has described this as his most difficult time as an engineer. "I probably lost a half a stone over that period because it was just so intense. I learned a lot from that. Most of all I learned the power of really rigorous engineering analysis in saving lives."

Parry-Jones has been noted for suggesting that "building a supercar is much easier than creating excellence for the millions." Edmunds.com called Parry-Jones a "driving dynamics guru" and Autocar called him "one of the world's leading automotive engineers."

== Personal and professional history ==
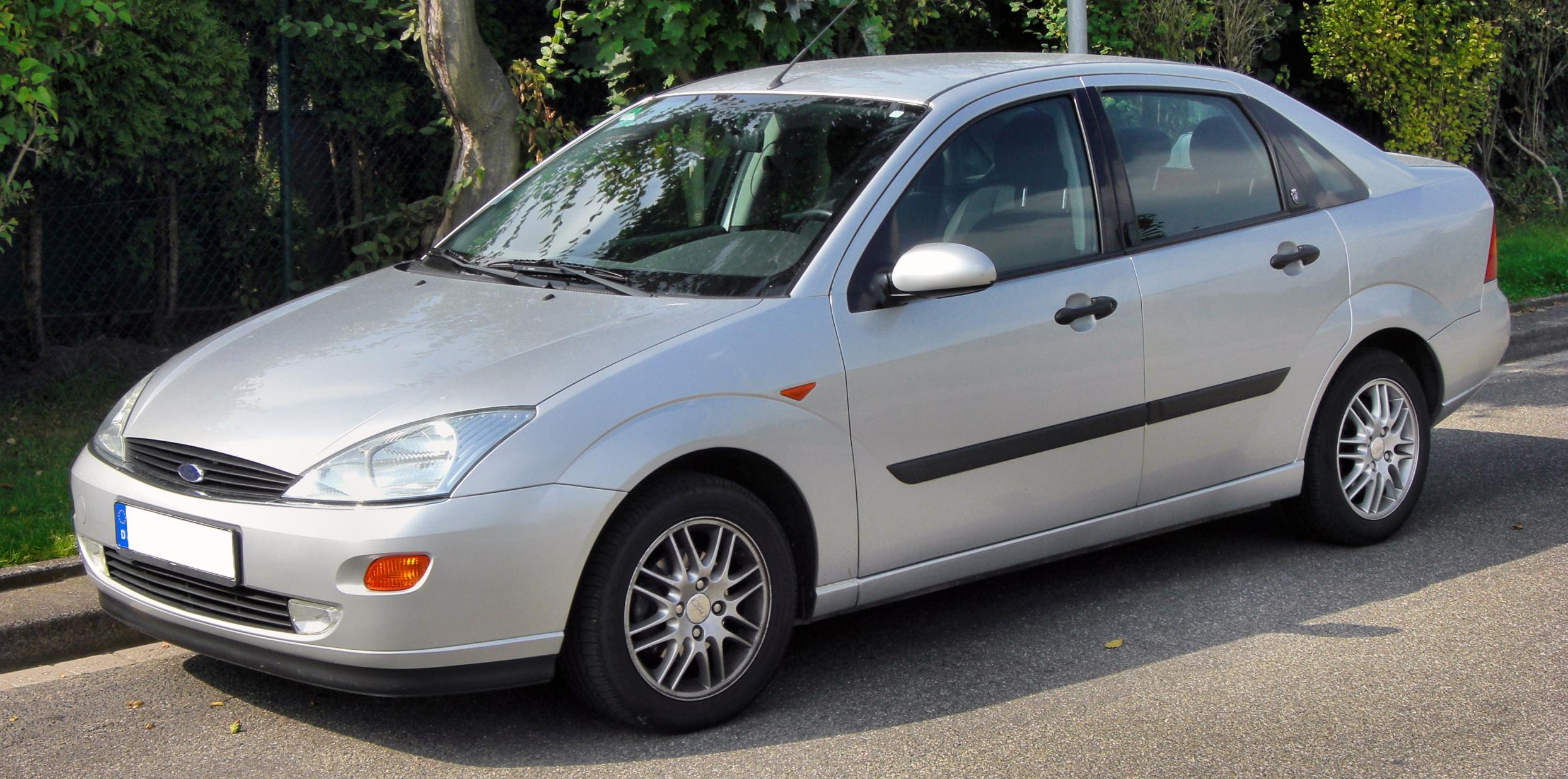
Ford Focus Mk1 4-door

Born on 15 September 1951 in Bangor, North Wales, the descendant of a North Wales slate quarry worker, Parry-Jones got the idea to become an automotive engineer after seeing the RAC Rally (now Rally GB) pass through the forest near his childhood home.

Parry-Jones joined Ford product development in 1969 as an undergraduate trainee, and was awarded a first class honours degree in Mechanical Engineering from Salford University, Manchester in 1973. That year, he married Hilary Gater, with whom he had two children. He was appointed Manager of Small Car Programs in 1982 and was named Executive Engineer of Ford's Technological Research in Europe in 1985, before adding responsibility for Vehicle Concepts a year later.

Fluent in English and German, Parry-Jones's international experience includes an assignment as Director of Vehicle Concepts Engineering in the United States in 1988, before taking charge of Manufacturing Operations at Ford's Cologne, Germany, assembly plant in 1990. He retired from Ford in 2007, after 38 years with the company.

While at Ford, Parry-Jones had been courted by Ferdinand Piëch to head the product development group at Volkswagen AG.

On retiring from Ford, Parry-Jones became involved on policy matters. He advised the Welsh Government on economic development, transport, energy and IT infrastructure. He also worked with central government, including the Department for Business, Innovation and Skills (BIS), where he chaired the new Automotive Innovation and Growth Team and then the Automotive Council UK which supports the automotive industry in Britain.

In 2008, Parry-Jones and his wife divorced, and he re-married, to Sara Price, with whom he had a son.

In July 2012, Parry-Jones became the chairman of Network Rail, a position he retained for nearly three years. He was non-executive chairman of Kelda Group, non-executive director of GKN plc and Cosworth Group Holdings and a council member of both the Royal Academy of Engineering and Bangor University.

Parry-Jones was a rugby fan, having played as a schoolboy. On 16 April 2021, he died from a heart attack on his tractor at his farm in Barmouth.

== 50 metre test ==
In developing automobile dynamics, Parry-Jones became well known for suggesting that a great deal could be learned about a vehicle's dynamics within a simple 50 Metre Test, rather than testing the vehicle at top speed, Parry-Jones insisted that engineers drive very slowly for 50 metres, sensing the subtleties of the vehicle's dynamics. suggesting that "an engineer could learn more from the 50-metre test than laps at the limits around the track."

Parry-Jones credited the racing driver Sir Jackie Stewart with influencing his approach to testing cars, saying "Jackie was tremendously helpful and influential with my approach. He's not an engineer so he can't fix cars, but he can extract information about a car's behavior in an uncannily detailed and superb way."

== Environmentalism ==
Parry-Jones embraced environmental initiatives. In a 2000 speech to the Society of Automotive Engineers at The Greenbrier, Parry-Jones said, "What our society wants us to do is to invent the technology to make personal, private transportation sustainable. People expect engineers to do the right thing. It's as if we had taken some kind of Hippocratic oath. And our profession has been around nearly as long as medicine itself."

== Awards ==
Parry-Jones was named Man of the Year in 1994 by the British publication Autocar and in 1997 by Automobile Magazine.

In 2001, he received the Golden Gear Award for Outstanding Automotive Achievement from the Washington Automotive Press Association, and was honoured as Marketing Statesman of the Year by the Sales and Marketing Executives of Detroit.

He was an elected Fellow of both the Royal Academy of Engineering and Institution of Mechanical Engineers.

In 2004 he was made an Honorary Fellow of the Royal Statistical Society in recognition of his pioneering work in the application of statistical methods to automobile engineering. He was appointed a CBE in the 2005 New Year Honours for services to the automobile industry.

In 2005 Parry-Jones received an Honorary Fellowship by his 'home' University of Wales in the North Wales town.

In 1995 he was awarded an Honorary Doctorate by Loughborough University in recognition of his outstanding contributions to the motor industry and engineering education. He was also a Visiting Professor and Fellow at the university.

In 2021, Autocar gave him a Lifetime Achievement award for his services to the automotive industry, informing him of it just two weeks before his death, which occurred in an accident involving a tractor on private land near Barmouth in Wales. Ford executive chairman Bill Ford described Mr Parry-Jones as a "rare talent who left an indelible mark on Ford and the industry".

On October 20, 2022, Ford Motor Company announced that a building used for the improvement of driving dynamics on Ford's Lommel Proving Ground in Belgium will from now on be known as the Richard Parry-Jones Appraisal Center, in honour of the company's renowned engineering leader.
