= Ford Individual =

Ford vehicle personalisation pack

The Ford Individual is a vehicle personalisation pack, introduced by Ford of Europe. It allows customers to personalise their new cars by selecting from a range of features and equipment that supplement standard trim levels.

Ford Individual option packs have been offered for the Ka, Fiesta, Kuga, Mondeo, S-MAX and Galaxy ranges, with detail features intended to give the cars a more luxurious finish. At the 2009 Geneva Motor Show, the packs were extended to the Focus, then Ford's best-selling model in Europe.

The Ford Individual includes these features in addition:

- Ford Individual Interior Styling Pack
- Ford Individual Exterior Styling Pack

== Examples ==
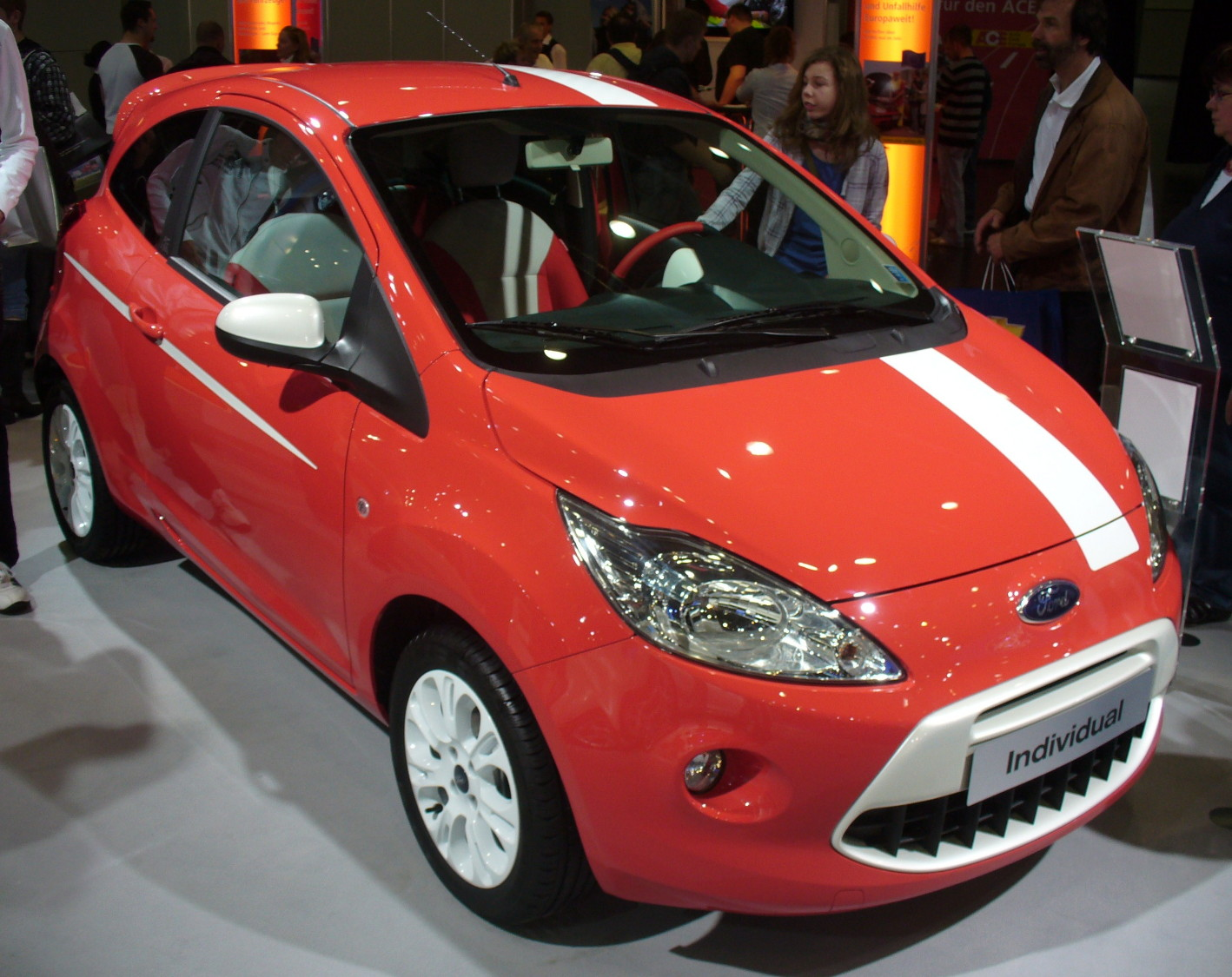
Ford Ka Individual Grand Prix

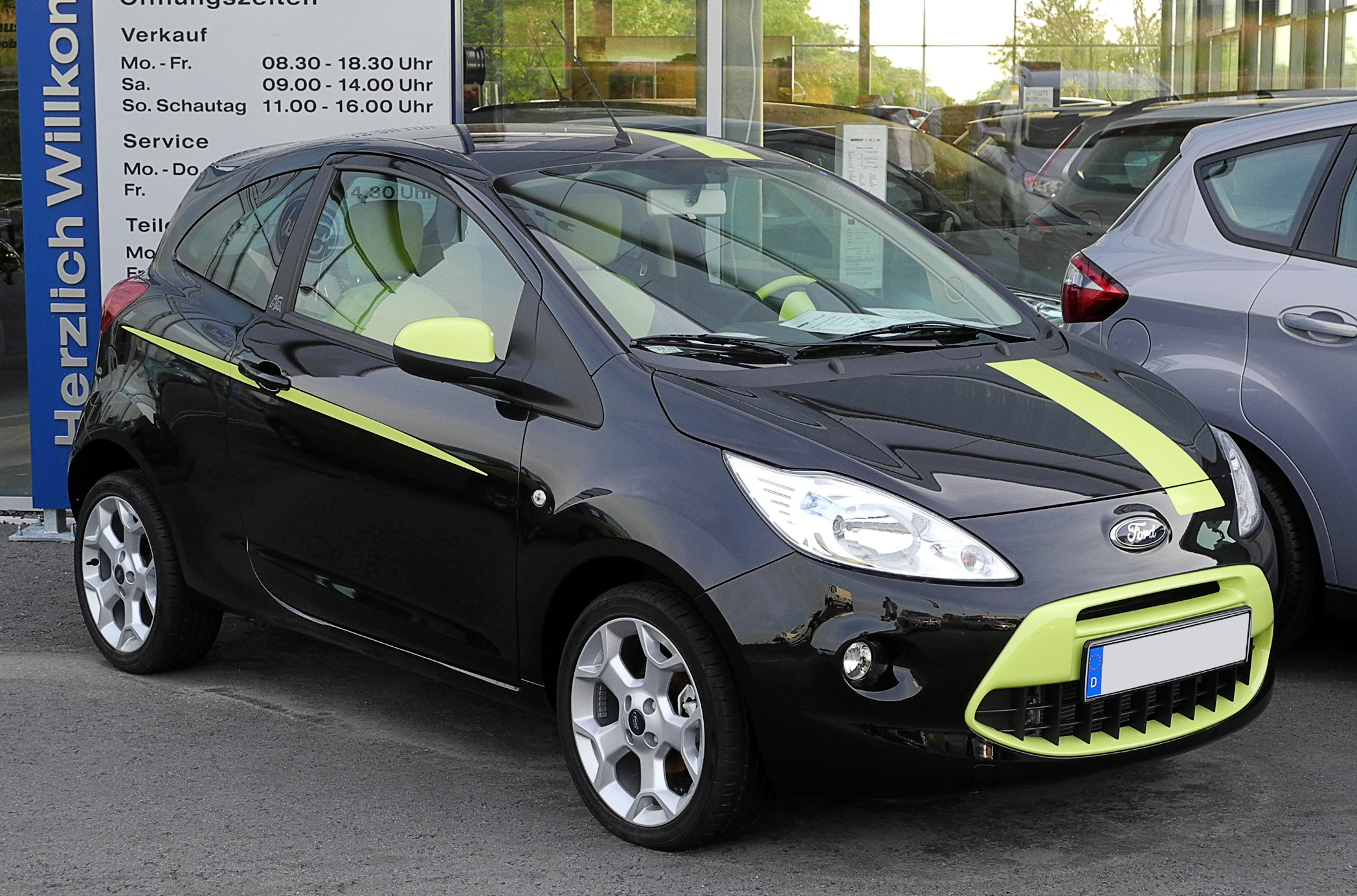
Ford Ka Individual Digital

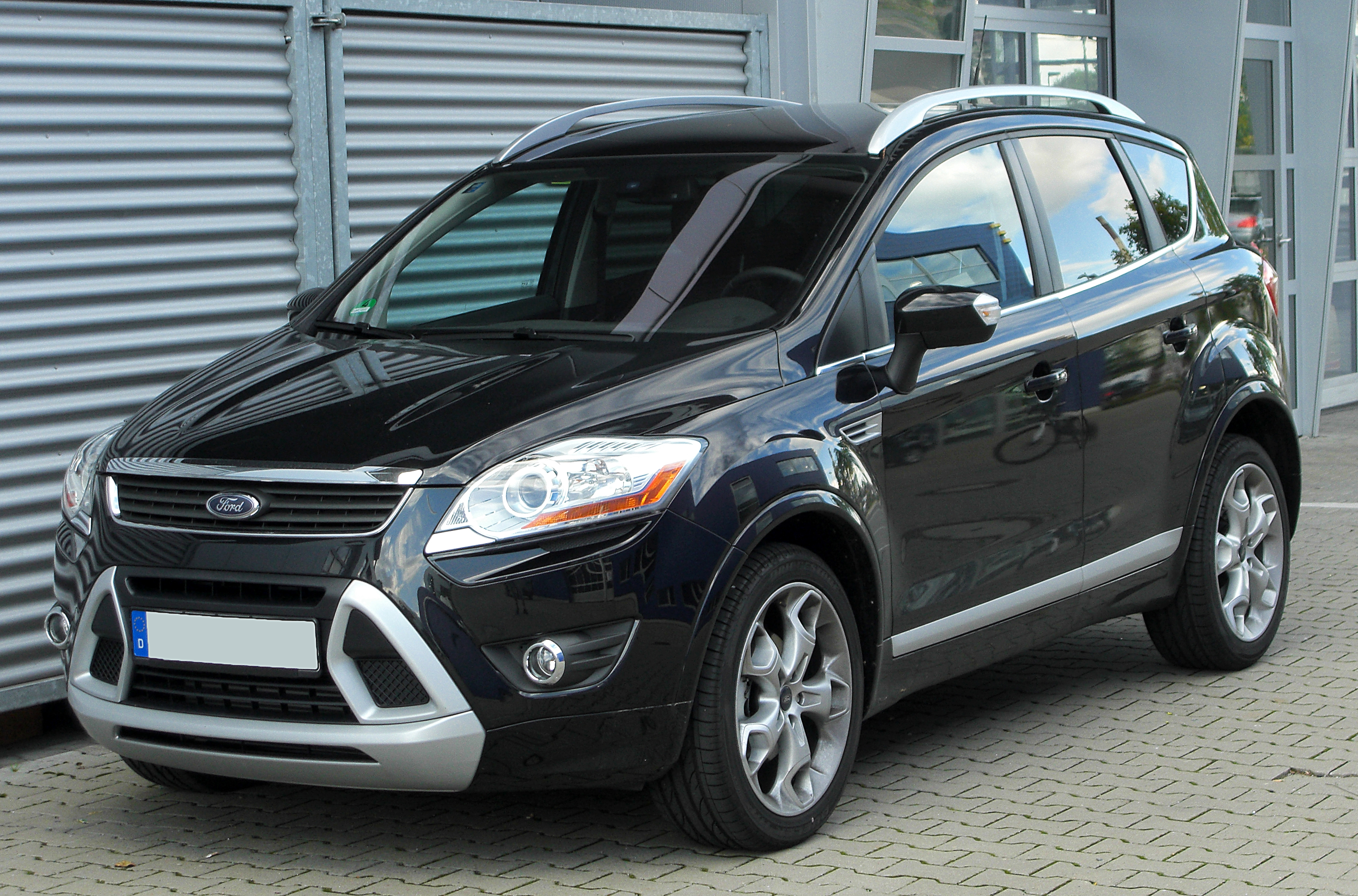
Ford Kuga Individual

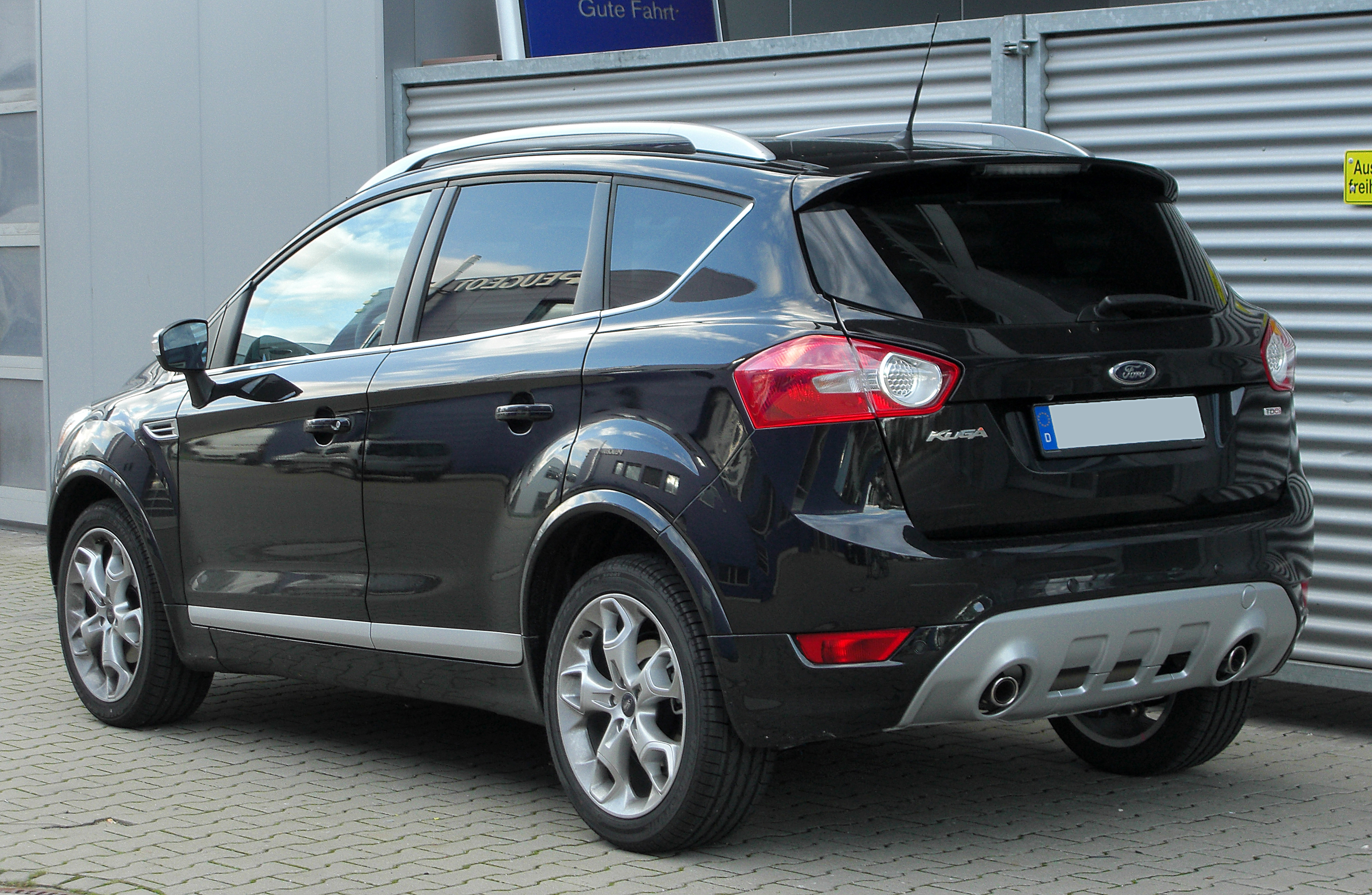
Ford Kuga Individual

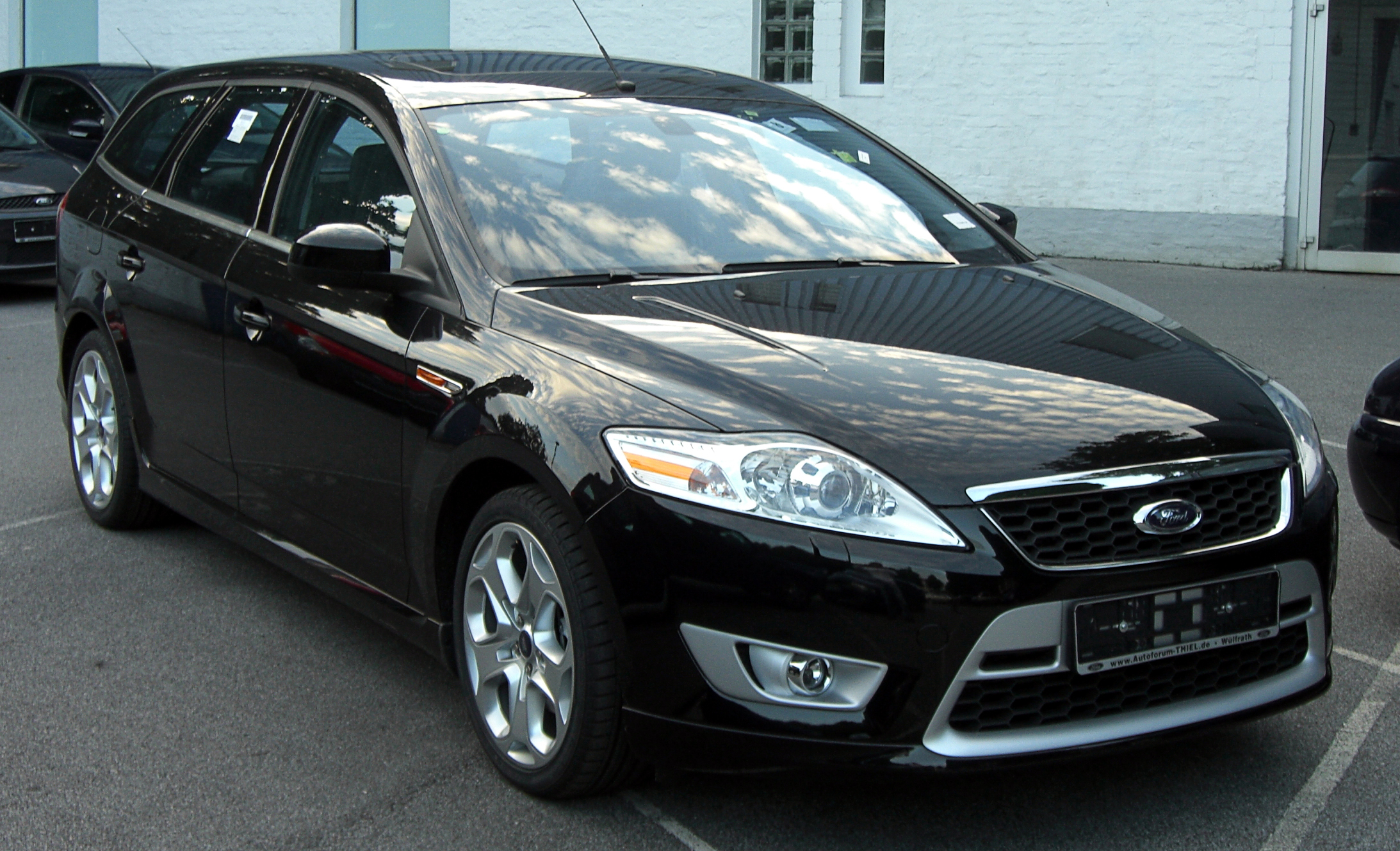
Ford Mondeo Turnier 2.5T Titanium Individual

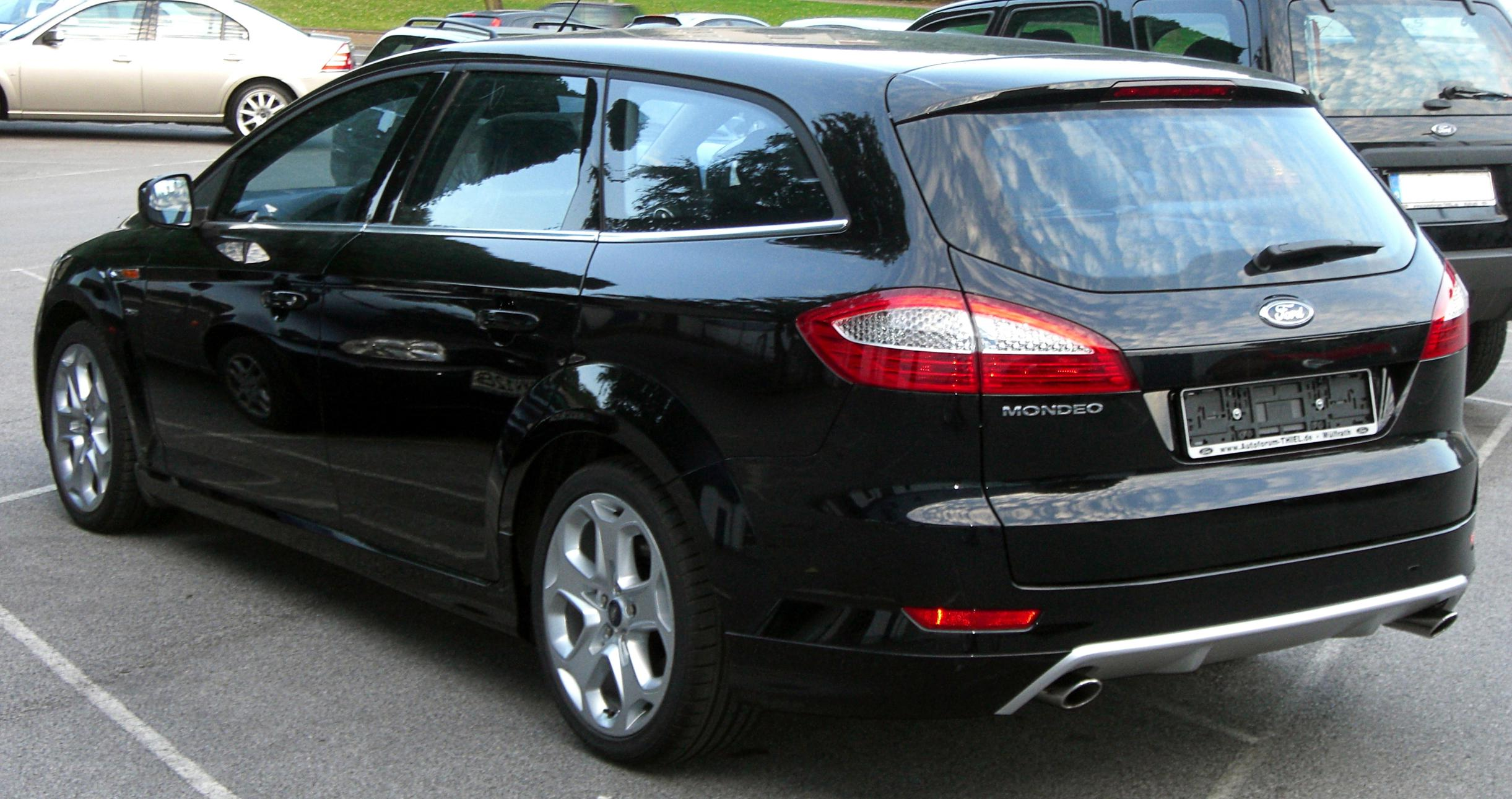
Ford Mondeo Turnier 2.5T Titanium Individual
