= Ford Ka =

Small car model by Ford (1996–2021)

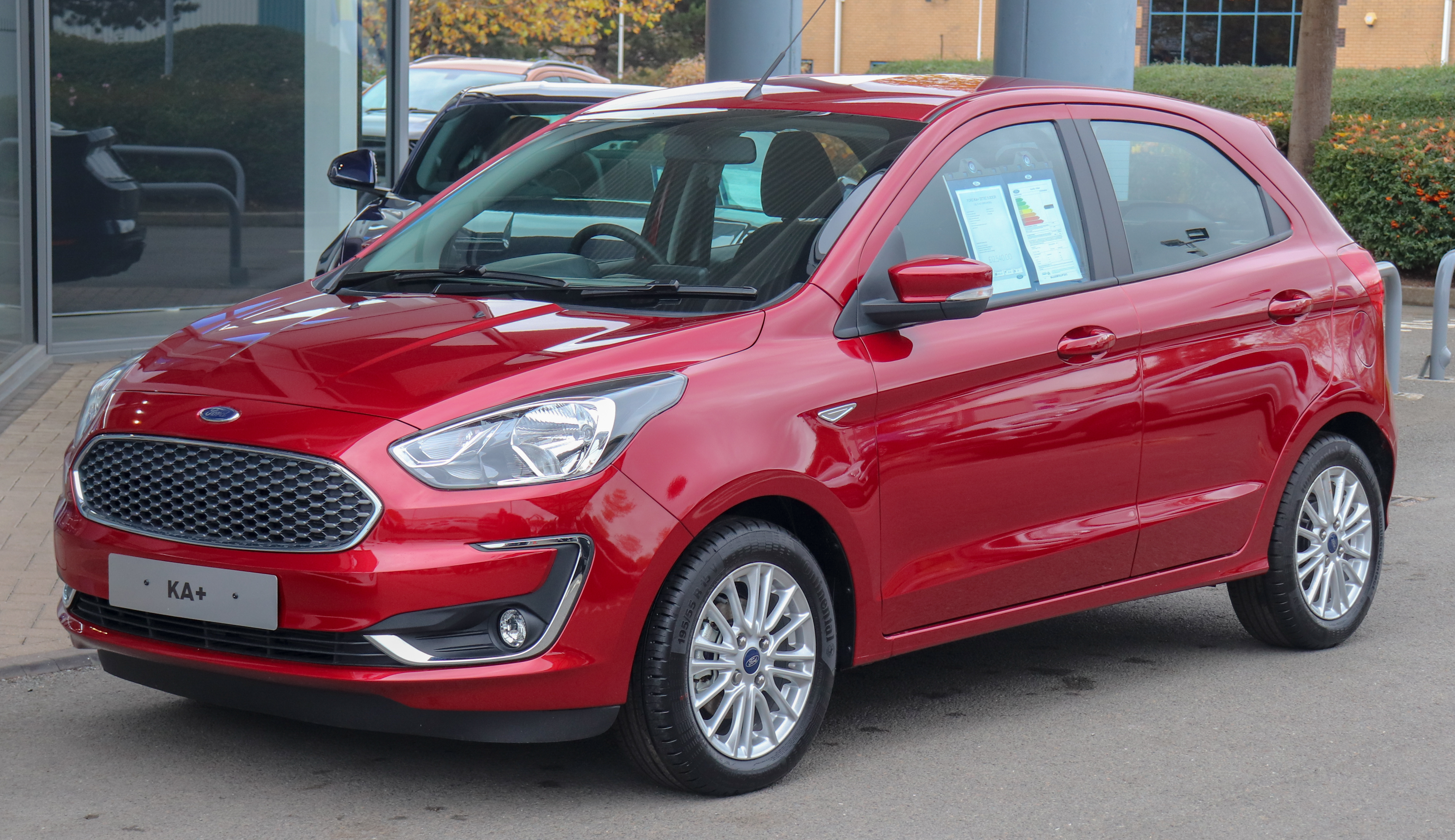
- 2018 Ford Ka+ Zetec 1.0

Overview
- Manufacturer: Ford
- Production: 1996–2021

Body and chassis
- Class: City car (1996–2016); Subcompact car (2014–2021)
- Layout: Front-engine, front-wheel drive

The Ford Ka is a small car which was manufactured by Ford Motor Company from 1996 to 2021 over three generations. It entered its second generation in 2008, produced by Fiat in Tychy, Poland. A third generation was introduced in 2014. The first two generations have been described as city cars, whilst the third generation has been called a subcompact car.

The first two generations have a three-door hatchback body style, with the first generation also having a two-door convertible version that was marketed as the StreetKa and a sporty hatch version, the SportKa. The third generation was produced as a five-door hatchback and as a four-door sedan. It was initially only available in Brazil, and later was introduced in India, Italy, Mexico, Spain, South Africa (where it was marketed as the Ford Figo), Argentina, and Poland. European sales ended in 2020, and in 2021 was taken out of production in Brazil.

== Pronunciation ==
The name Ka has three possible pronunciations. It can be said using a long or short "a" (/ˈkɑː/, /ˈkæ/), or with the letters pronounced separately (/ˈkeɪ eɪ/). Ford's press office has used all three. According to Auto Trader, Ford "top brass" have given the correct pronunciation as "Ka as in cat" (/kæ/).

== First generation (BE146; 1996) ==
First generation
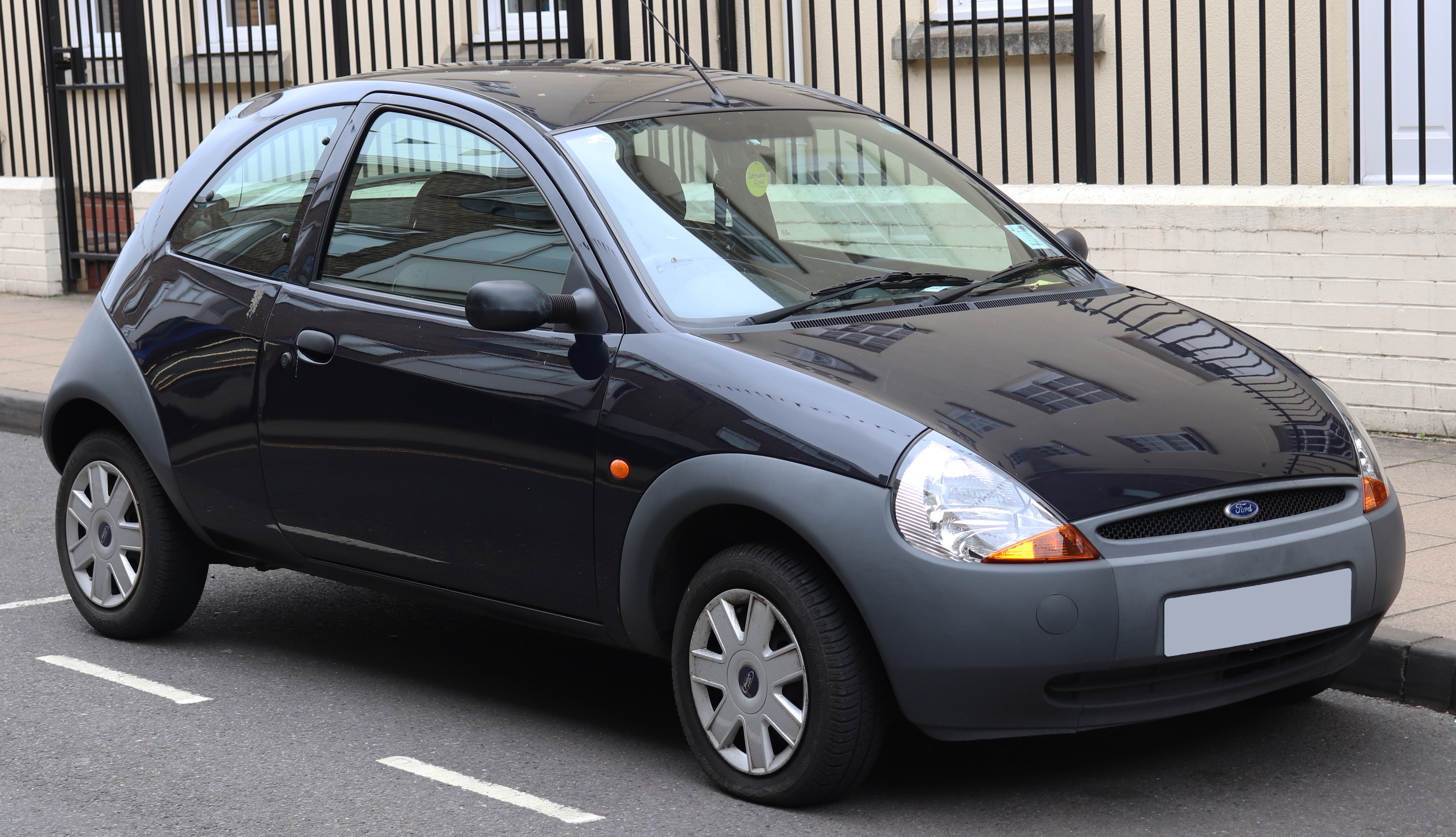

Overview
- Model code: BE146
- Production: 1996–2008
- Assembly: Spain: Almussafes (Valencia Body and Assembly); Brazil: São Bernardo do Campo (Ford Brazil); Italy: Turin (Pininfarina: StreetKa) (Note: StreetKa only.)
- Designer: Claude Lobo (Ka); Pininfarina (StreetKa)

Body and chassis
- Body style: 3-door hatchback; 2-door convertible (StreetKa); 3-door van

Powertrain
- Engine: Petrol: 1.0 L Endura E I4 flex fuel (Brazil); 1.3 L Endura E I4 (until 2002); 1.3 L Duratec I4 (from 2002); 1.6 L Zetec I4; 1.6 L Zetec I4 flex fuel (Brazil)
- Transmission: 5-speed manual

Dimensions
- Wheelbase: 2,452 mm (96.5 in)
- Length: 3,620–3,650 mm (142.5–143.7 in)
- Width: 1,631–1,695 mm (64.2–66.7 in)
- Height: 1,368–1,409 mm (53.9–55.5 in)
- Curb weight: 820–962 kg (1,808–2,121 lb)

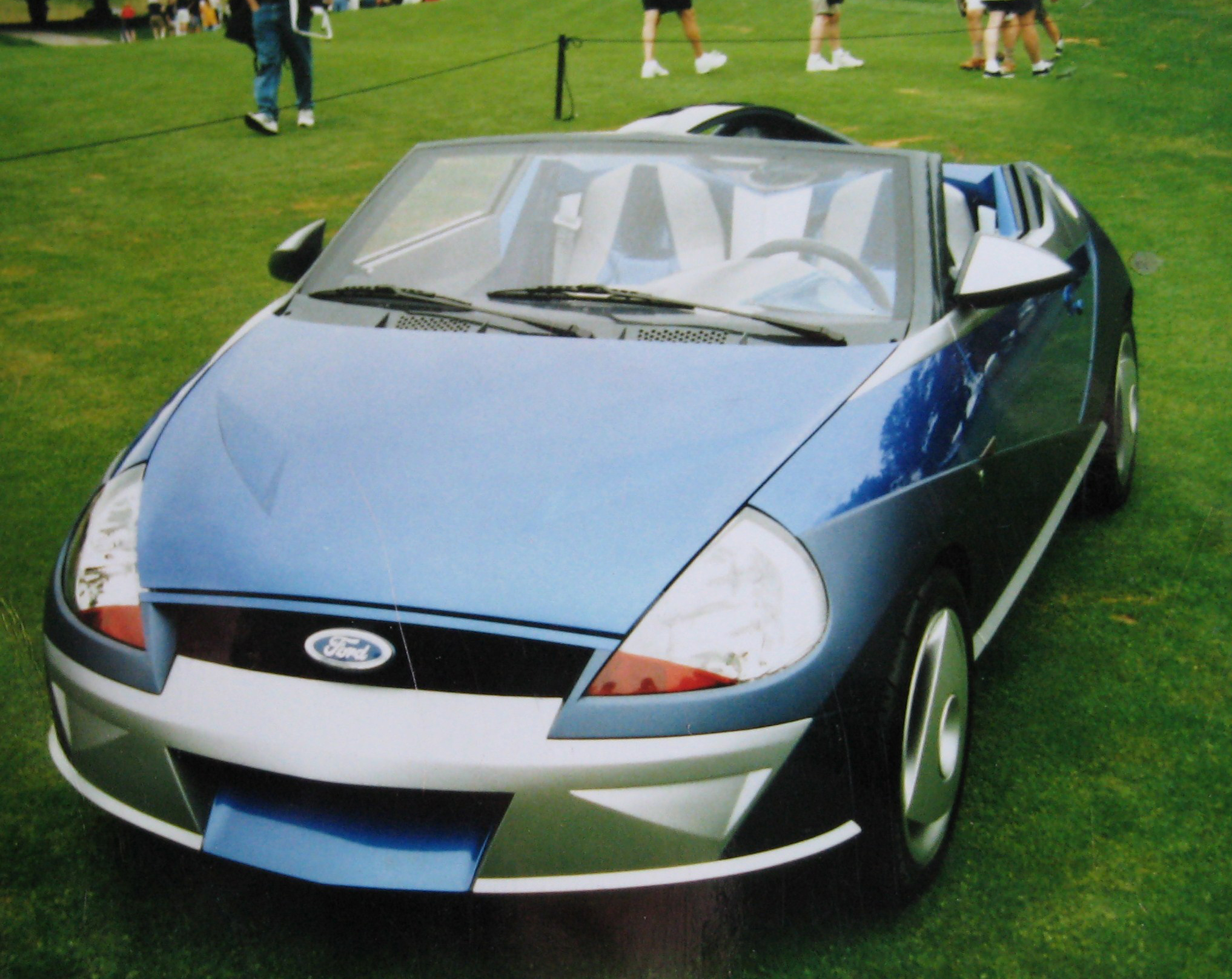
Ghia Saetta show car (1996)

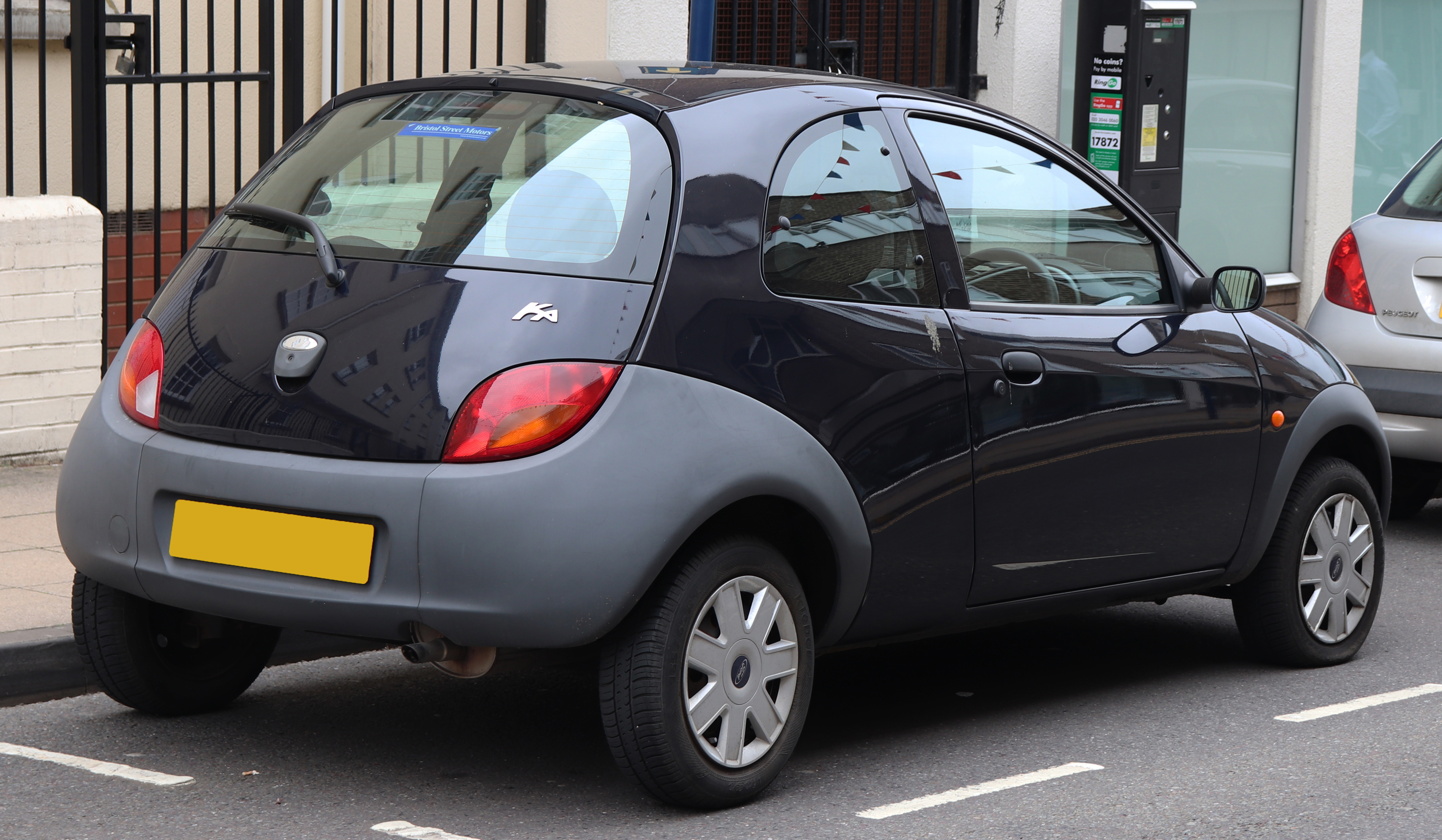
Rear view

The first Ford Ka was introduced on September 11, 1996, as a small and low-cost addition to the Ford range. Developed under the BE146 development code, it was based on the Mark 3 Ford Fiesta platform, but with a completely different exterior design. The design borrowed from Ghia's "Saetta" show car, a roadster designed by Filippo Sapino. The Ka evolved from concept vehicles to production with minor changes. The large, one-piece, moulded bumpers and wheel arches made the vehicle more durable and easier to repair. The vehicle was manufactured on the existing Fiesta production line in Almussafes, Valencia, minimising new model investment costs. The chief program engineer was Kevin O’Neill. The designer of the car was Chris Svensson of Sunderland, who had designed a similar-shaped car when at the Royal College of Art in 1992.

When the Ka was first introduced to the public, it provoked mixed reactions due to its unusual New Edge design, overseen by Jack Telnack and executed by Claude Lobo.

Besides the styling, the Ka, like its sister cars Fiesta and Puma, was lauded in the motoring press for its handling. Under Richard Parry-Jones' supervision, the suspension and steering settings allowed for hard cornering and high levels of grip, providing strong handling characteristics.

At launch, the Ka was created as a single model with a number of production options, including air conditioning, power steering, height-adjustable driver's seat, adjustable position rear seat with head restraints, passenger airbag, central locking, and power windows. However, anti-lock braking was only added as an option, and not until January 1997.

The car's main drawback was the 1,300 cc overhead valve four-cylinder Endura-E engine, a derivative of the Valencia unit used in all the previous generations of the Fiesta and based on the older "Kent" design, which dated back to the 1960s. Although not very modern, it provided enough torque to allow relaxed if not spirited driving. In 2002, the Endura-E was replaced by the overhead-cam Duratec engine, with claims of improved fuel efficiency and increased refinement, mostly caused by taller gearing on the cars without air conditioning.

=== Endura-E engine specs (Ka) ===
998 cc (Brazil):

- Power output - 53HP (5250 rpm)
- Torque - 77.2 Nm (4000 rpm)
- Bore - 68.68mm
- Stroke - 67.40mm
- Redline - 5450 rpm
- RPM Limit - 5675 rpm

1297 cc:

- Power output - 60HP (5000 rpm)
- Torque - 104.0 Nm (3500 rpm)
- Bore - 74mm
- Stroke - 75.5mm
- Redline - 5450 rpm
- RPM Limit - 5675 rpm

For the first three years of production, all models had black plastic bumpers to minimise parking damage to paintwork in city environments. These bumpers contained a stabiliser to prevent UV degradation, which made them unsuitable for painting because the paint would not adhere properly. Since many owners wanted body-coloured bumpers, they were introduced in 1999 using different bumper mouldings (without the stabiliser).

The Ka proved highly profitable for Ford despite its low selling price, largely due to low development costs. In 2006, Ford sold 17,000 cars in the United Kingdom. In Australia, the Ka was introduced in October 1999 and was on the market until 2002. It was unsuccessful; fewer than 2,000 were sold per year. This was partly due to the lack of an automatic transmission, which is preferred by a large proportion of Australian car buyers. The Ka was also sold in New Zealand between 1999 and 2004, and was replaced by the newer Fiesta.

=== Markets ===
==== United Kingdom ====
The Ka was the best-selling car in its class in the United Kingdom for a number of years and commanded around a fifth of the city-car market. The UK model range originally consisted of the base version, the Ka, and the higher specification Ka^{2}, which standardised a number of the options listed above. The Ka^{2} badge was fitted by dealers. The Ka^{3} was introduced later. Power steering was added to the base Ka after the first year.

Concurrent with the introduction of body-coloured bumpers, Ka^{2} and Ka^{3} were replaced by Ka Collection and the LuxuryKa (later Ka Luxury).

The Luxury version came with a Quickclear heated windscreen, leather seats and interior trim, and standard air conditioning. A "Ka Blue" special edition was also launched in the UK with dark blue bumpers and a silvery-blue dashboard insert, rather than the standard models' silver. The Ka Sun Collection with a full-length fabric folding roof was also added to the range during the summer.

Unique to the UK was the Ford Ka Van variant, produced for BT Group and featuring a bespoke flat plywood floor with rubber overmat and white-ply covers instead of rear windows.

A further line-up revision gave Ka the following trim levels in the United Kingdom: Studio, Style, Style Climate, and Zetec Climate. In 2005, the Sublime model was introduced featuring special leather interior and features not found on other models. It was produced in only very small numbers and is now one of the most sought-after Kas. The SportKa was also added to the range. With the car's impending replacement, in May 2008, a Finale special edition with distinguishing features such as roof decal and black wing mirrors was made available.

==== Latin America ====
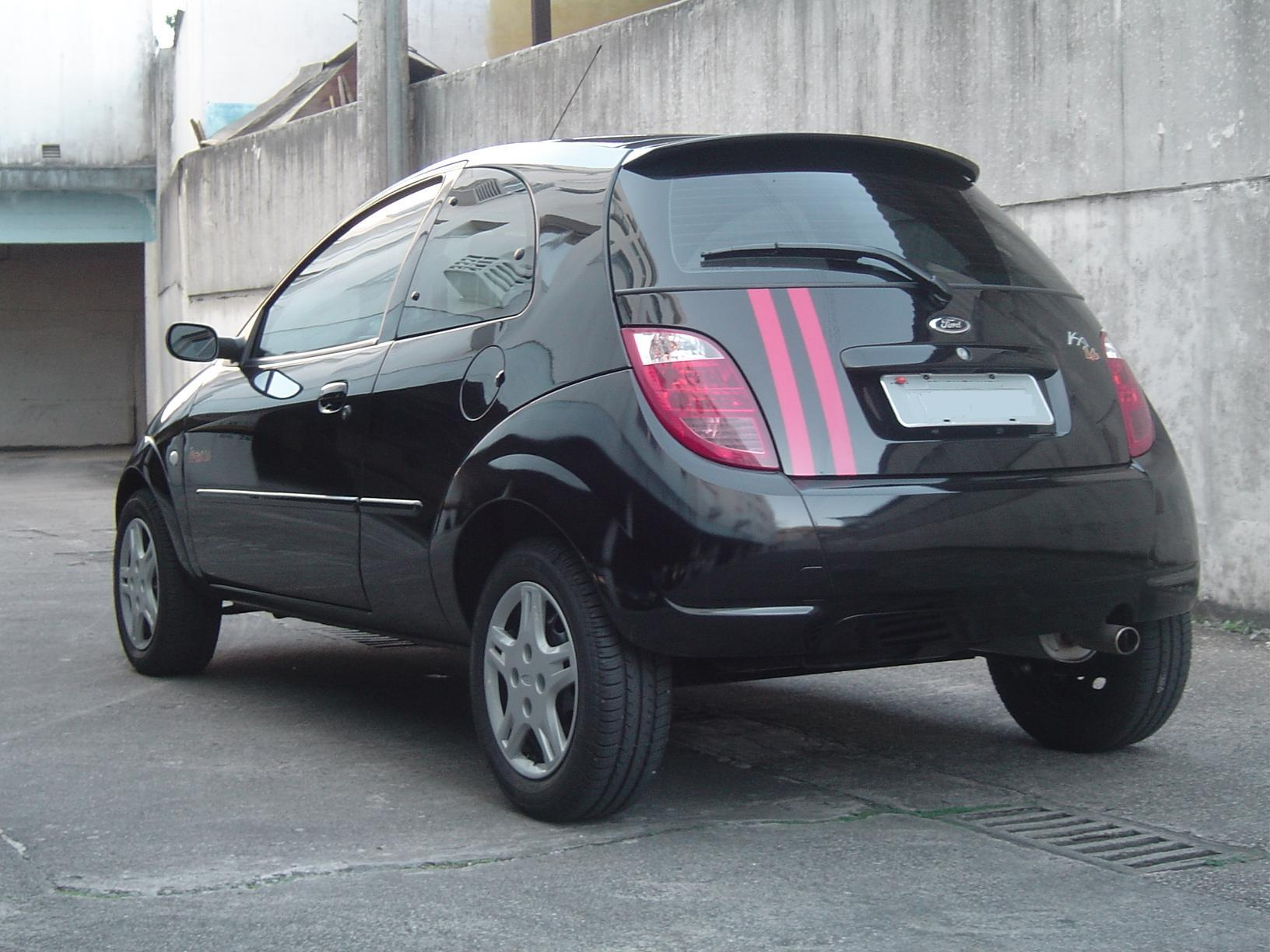
2005 Ford Ka (facelift, Brazil)

From the 1997 launch, and until 2001, the Latin American Ka was substantially similar to the European Ka, differing only in levels of equipment and trim. The main differences from the European model were the very short gearing for the manual transmission (the only transmission available) and the lack of soundproofing, which had been gradually removed annually since 2000 as a way to cut down costs, following the practice of other Brazilian car makers at the time.

In 2001, the Latin American Ka received a midcycle facelift, which left it slightly different, externally, to the European model. The most noticeable difference was at the rear, where the number plate was moved from the bumper to the boot (trunk) lid, and the rear lights were made much taller.

=== StreetKa and SportKa ===
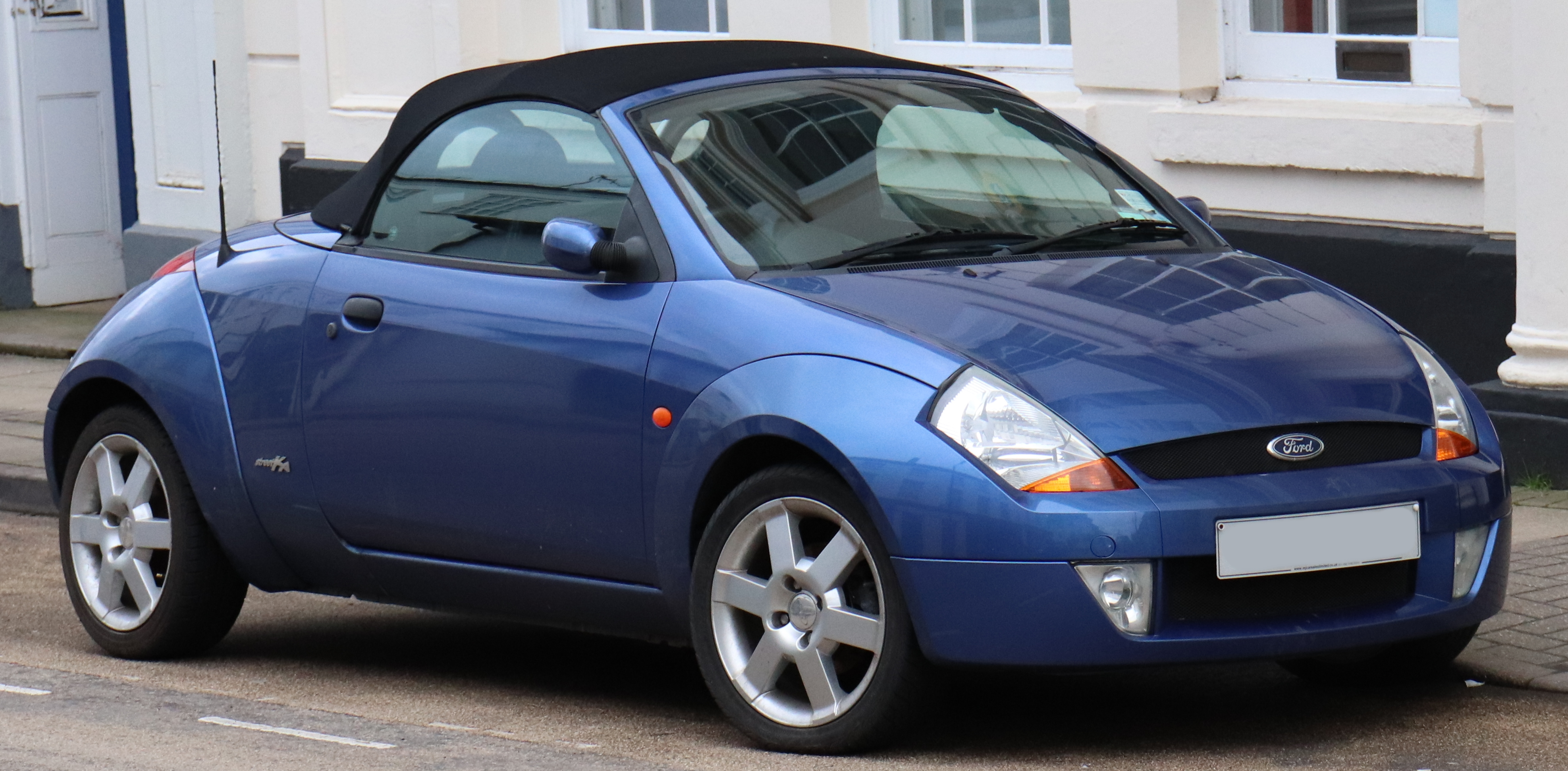

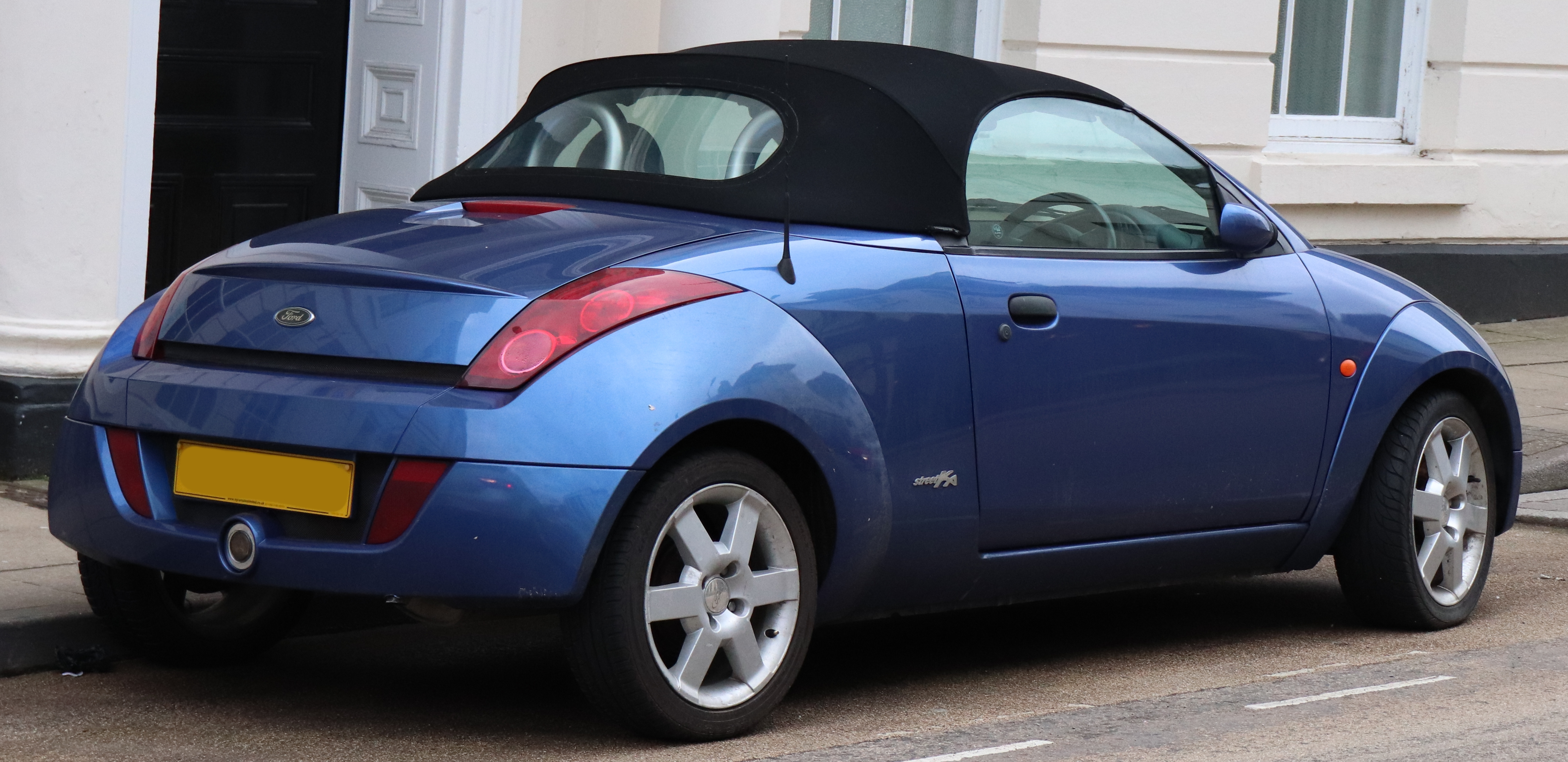
Ford StreetKa

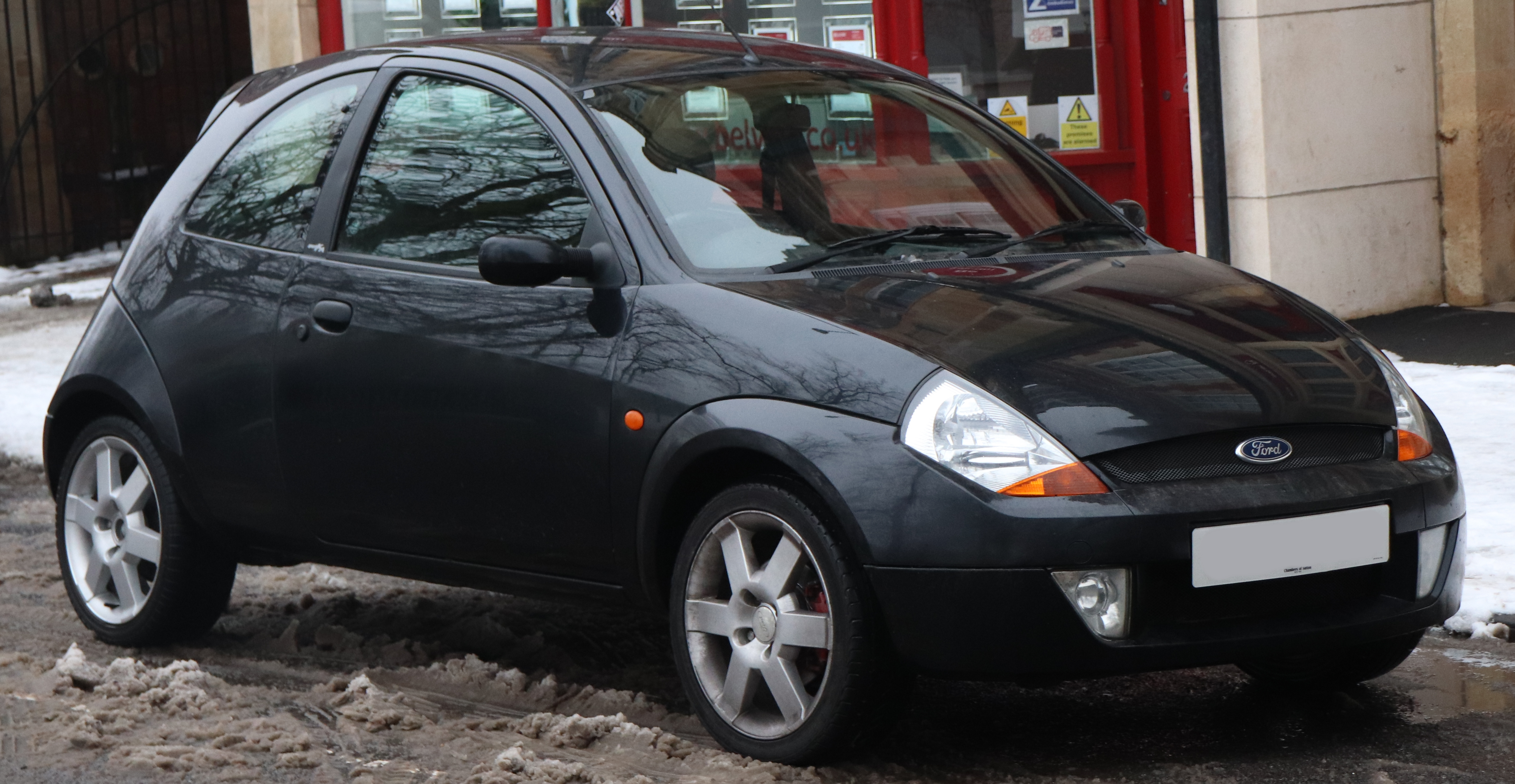

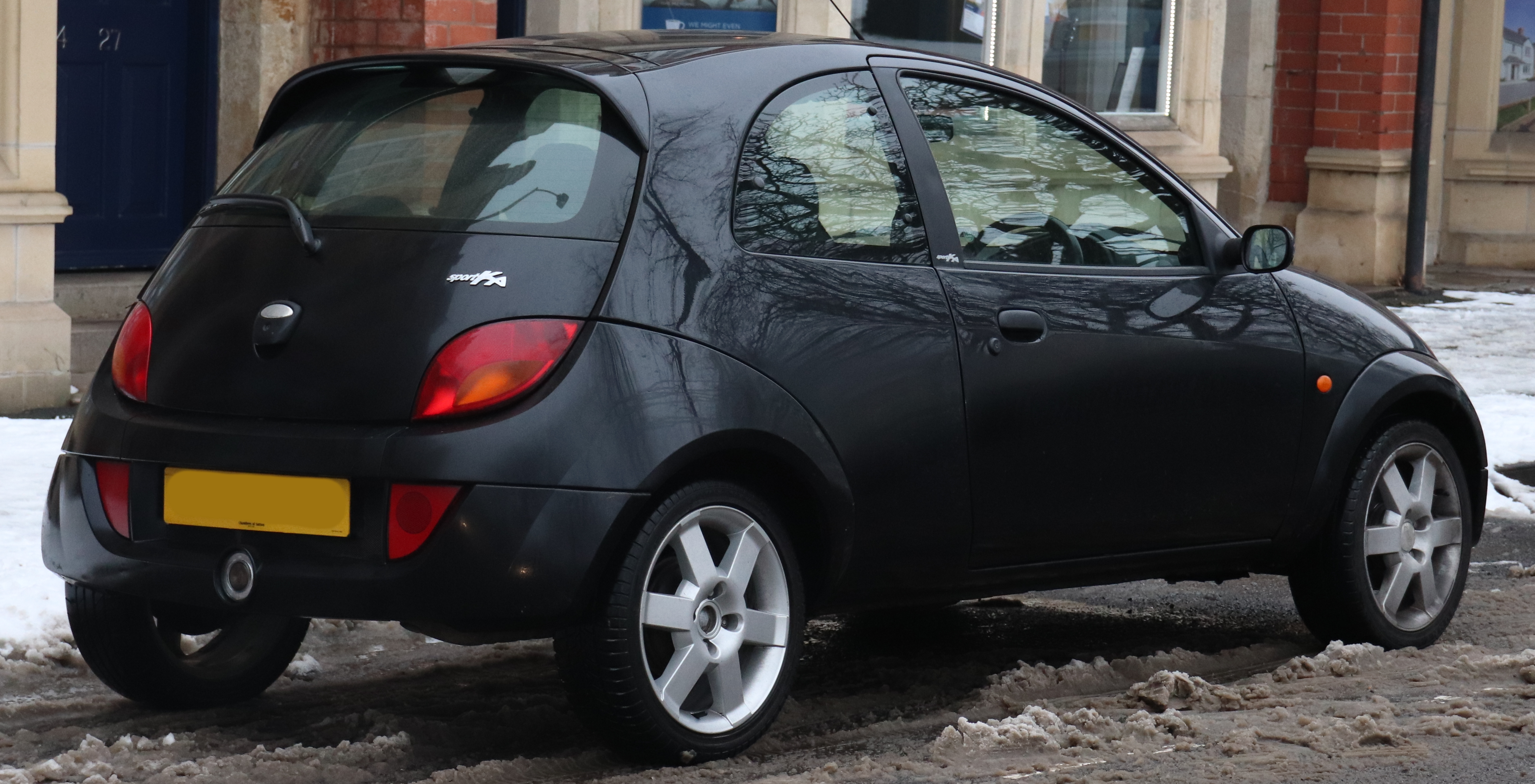
Ford SportKa

In 2003, the Ka brand was diversified, with the addition of a new SportKa featuring a sporty body kit, wider track with stiffened suspension and redesigned 16" (40 cm) alloy wheels. Both models came with slightly widened bumpers front and rear with integral fog lamps. A convertible model called StreetKa also appeared, launched with the help of Australian pop star Kylie Minogue at the Paris Motor Show. It featured a manually folding soft top or an optional detachable hardtop (on the Winter Edition).

StreetKa was designed and built by Pininfarina (the 2000 motor show concept was designed by Ghia, Turin) in Italy, and all StreetKas have sill plates inscribed "Pininfarina". Pininfarina produced 37,076 StreetKas between 2003 and 2005. The build quality of the Streetka was far superior to the standard three-door Ka, with improved rust proofing.

StreetKa came in two equipment levels, basic and luxury. The Basic had cloth seats and air conditioning was an option. The Luxury featured leather seats with matching leather door-card inserts, heated seats, a Thatcham approved alarm along with Ford's PATS immobiliser, air conditioning, and heated door mirrors. Options included upgrading the single CD/radio to an in-dash six-disc CD/radio and additional rear speakers beneath the rollover bars and a heated windscreen, standard on winter models. All models featured remote-control central locking with remote boot release, driver and passenger air bags with passengers air bag deactivation, electric windows and door mirrors, electric headlight aim adjustment, antilock brakes, power steering, front fog lights, racing Puma aluminium gear knob, electric hood cover release, and a tachometer.

The engine used in StreetKa (and SportKa) is called a Duratec, but it is of South American origin, where it is known as the Zetec Rocam. StreetKa features MacPherson struts front and rear and uses unique wider front lower arms (wishbones), giving it exceptional handling. The only exterior panels shared with Ka are the bonnet and the headlights, the latter of which appear different due to the front bumper covering them partly to change their shape. The interior shares most parts with Ka, except the StreetKa has its facia painted blue rather than silver. Its seats are mounted lower than Ka's and it has aluminium effect detailing.

Both the StreetKa and SportKa received a new 95 PS (70 kW; 94 hp) 1.6-litre eight-valve Duratec petrol engine, whereas Ka, Ka Collection, and LuxuryKa retained the 1.3-litre Duratec petrol engine. The SportKa was noted for its surprising advertising campaign, "The Ka's Evil Twin", denouncing the Ka's traditionally perceived "cute" design. The StreetKa ceased to be officially on sale in late 2006.

A pink version was produced to promote the 2004 Thunderbirds film, and was supplied by Ford to the movie producer. The Thunderbird movie cars were unveiled at the Birmingham Motor Show. Only eight Pink StreetKas were produced by Ford for the film, five in right-hand drive and three in left-hand drive. All were signed by Sophia Myles (Miss Lady Penelope). The matching StreetKa dress designed by Bruce Oldfield of Ford was later sold in an auction during London Fashion Week to raise money for Barnados.

In 2005, all Ka models, including the SportKa and StreetKa, received a slightly updated interior, bringing the cabin back up to date, while still retaining the look and feel of the original. The SportKa continued to be available until 2008.

=== Motorsport ===
A Ford Ka rally championship was created in 1998. It has proved to be one of the most popular junior rally championships (Ford Ka Rally Cup) in the UK and Ireland. In 2007, Luke Pinder won the BRC Silverstone Tyre 1400 Championship in a Chris Birkbeck Ford Ka.

A Series based on Ford KA Mk1 1300cc (produced between 2002 and 2008) exists in UK as EnduroKA

==== Ka Rally Car ====
Built by the Ford Motorsport (Ford TeamRS) works at Boreham, Essex, The Rally Ka was designed as an entry-level vehicle to compete in a one-make series as part of the British Mintex rally championship. The Ka Championship in 1997 had just four cars in the debut Granite City Rally event. In 1998, 15 competitors undertook the Mintex challenge. Ford's Boreham airfield facility provides a complete build service for competitors wishing to rally Ka. Most of the parts supplied are concerned with strengthening the car for rallying. Uprated engine mounts and suspension bushes are all included, as is a front strut brace. Aluminium sump and fuel tank guards, OZ Rally wheels, and a Safety Devices bolt-in roll cage are all either fitted by the Boreham works or supplied to individual teams. Performance-enhancing modifications are limited to the addition of a Rally spec engine control unit, camshaft and 4-into-2-into-1 extractor set attached to a free-flowing exhaust. This combination lifts power to 80 hp (60 kW), and to cope with it, competitors are encouraged to fit the optional uprated drive shafts with larger CV joints. A limited-slip differential and heavier clutch plate are also available. A competition brake package consisting of Mintex pads gripping vented front brake rotors and stronger rear drums is homologated for Rally Ka. Replacing the original shock absorbers is a set of four remote-reservoir Proflex coil-over struts adjustable for compression and rebound damping. These are allied to a lowering kit and adjustable spring platforms to give Ka competitors a wide range of suspension settings including ride height. Inside, the Rally Ka is all business. In true rally fashion, gone are all but the essentials - the two central eyeball vents are replaced by a tachometer and auxiliary gauge. Even the replacement panels in the dashboard, which support the fire extinguisher button and extra switches and gauges required in a rally car are listed in the Boreham parts schedule. A deeply dished rally steering wheel, competition seats, and harnesses are all supplied from the kit, and replacements are not allowed.

== Second generation (2008) ==
=== European version (B420) ===
Second generation (Europe)
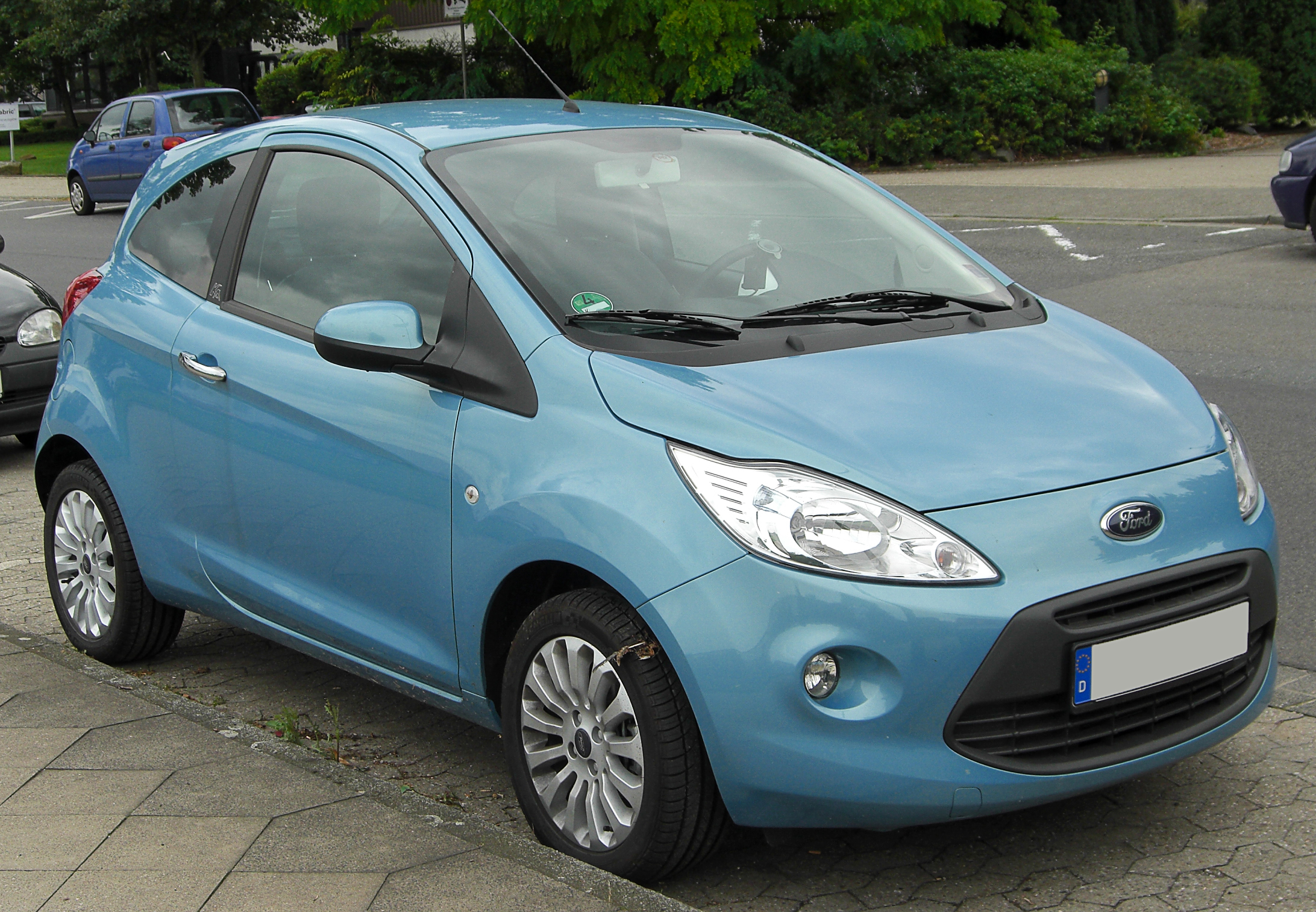

Overview
- Model code: B420
- Production: July 2008 – May 2016
- Assembly: Poland: Tychy (Fiat Auto Poland)

Body and chassis
- Body style: 3-door hatchback
- Platform: Fiat Mini platform
- Related: Fiat 500; Fiat Panda; Lancia Ypsilon

Powertrain
- Engine: Petrol: 1.2 L Duratec (FIRE) I4; Diesel: 1.3 L Duratorq (Multijet) I4
- Transmission: 5-speed manual

Dimensions
- Wheelbase: 2,300 mm (90.6 in)
- Length: 3,620 mm (142.5 in)
- Width: 1,658 mm (65.3 in)
- Height: 1,505 mm (59.3 in)
- Curb weight: 870 kg (1,920 lb)

In 2008, the European Ka was replaced with a model developed and produced for Ford by Fiat in conjunction with Fiat's own 500 vehicle. The car was built in Fiat's Tychy, Poland, factory alongside the Fiat 500, Fiat Panda, and Lancia Ypsilon. Production started on 18 July 2008.

Based on the Fiat 500 architecture, its interior offers optional Bluetooth phone connection, wireless voice control, a USB port, a CD Radio, MP3, an AUX connector, steering-wheel audio controls, and a speaker system consisting of six speakers, a subwoofer, and an amplifier.

The second-generation Ka came with a choice of two engines, a 1.2-litre petrol with 69 PS (51 kW) of power and 102 N⋅m (75 lbf⋅ft) of torque and a 1.3-litre TDCi diesel engine with 75 PS (55 kW; 74 hp) of power and 145 N⋅m (107 lb⋅ft) of torque. Both engines come with sub-120 g/km CO_{2} emissions (119 for the petrol and 112 for the diesel). Both engines are supplied from Fiat.

The Ka featured shock absorption revised from the Fiat 500 along with a rear antiroll bar enabling 30% softer springs and accordingly retuned dampers to improve ride performance over uneven road surfaces. Some of these improvements were subsequently adopted on Fiat 500 Abarth and Fiat 500C models. The Ka uses an electrically assisted steering system, which makes the steering much lighter and more energy efficient than its predecessor.

The second-generation Ka has an overall Euro NCAP safety rating of four stars, with standard driver and passenger single-stage front airbags, ABS, immobiliser, hazard warning lights, and remote central locking (except Studio version in UK). In addition, it has front side airbags and curtain airbags and electronic stability control with hydraulic brake assist and hill launch assist that come at an extra cost.

The Ka made its debut in the 22nd James Bond film Quantum of Solace and was unveiled in October 2008's Paris Motor Show.

Production ended on 20 May 2016.

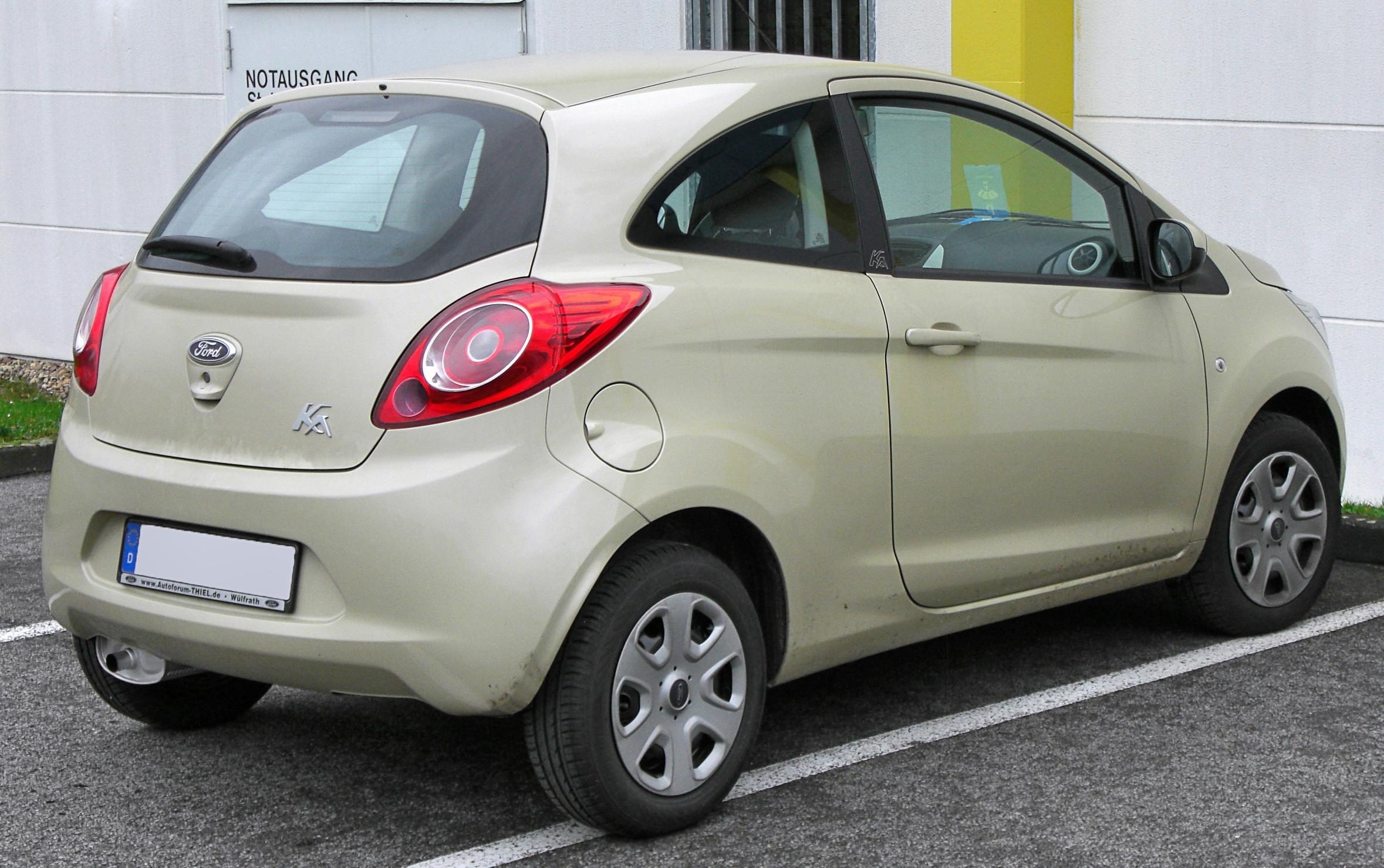
Rear view

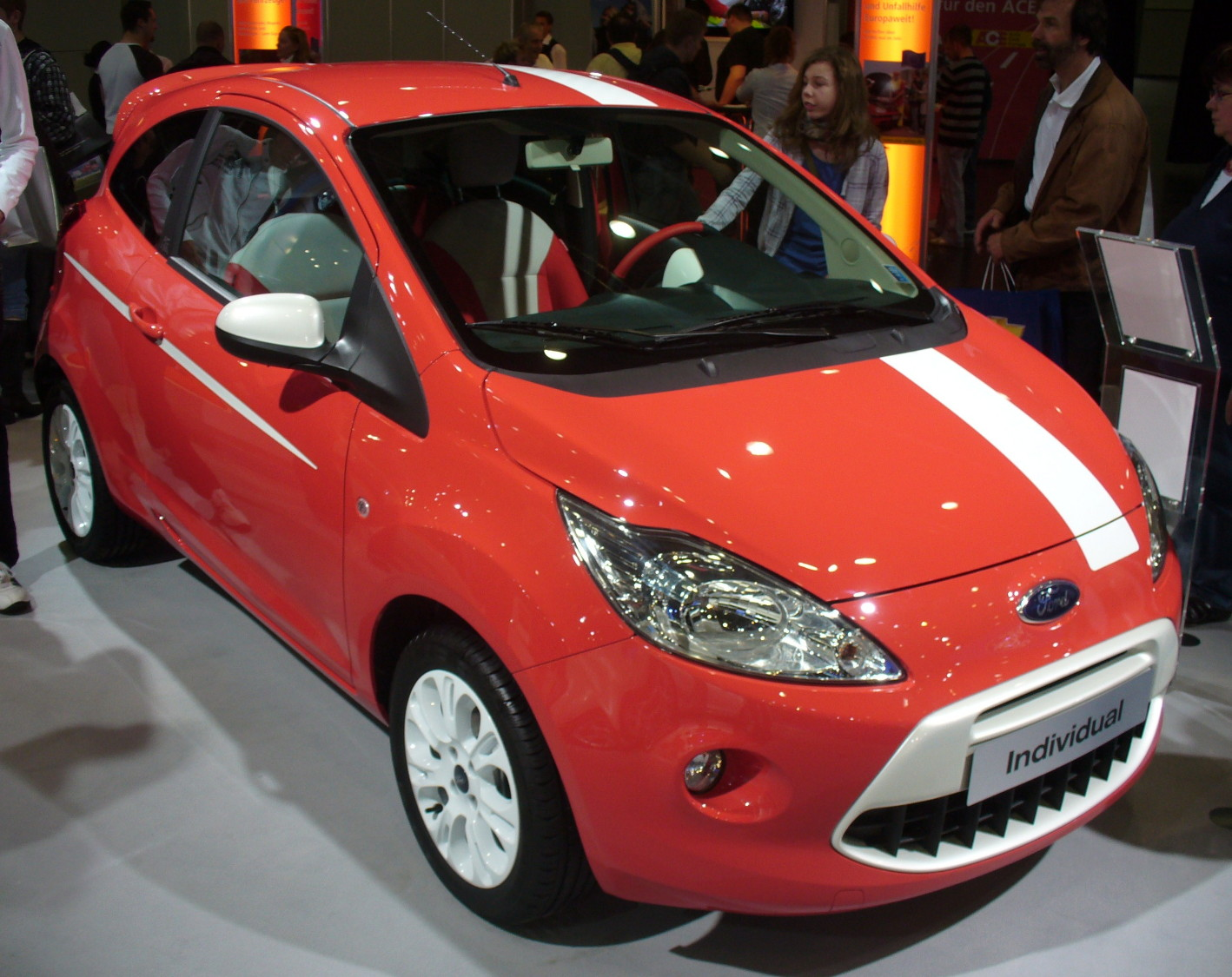
Ford Ka Individual Grand Prix

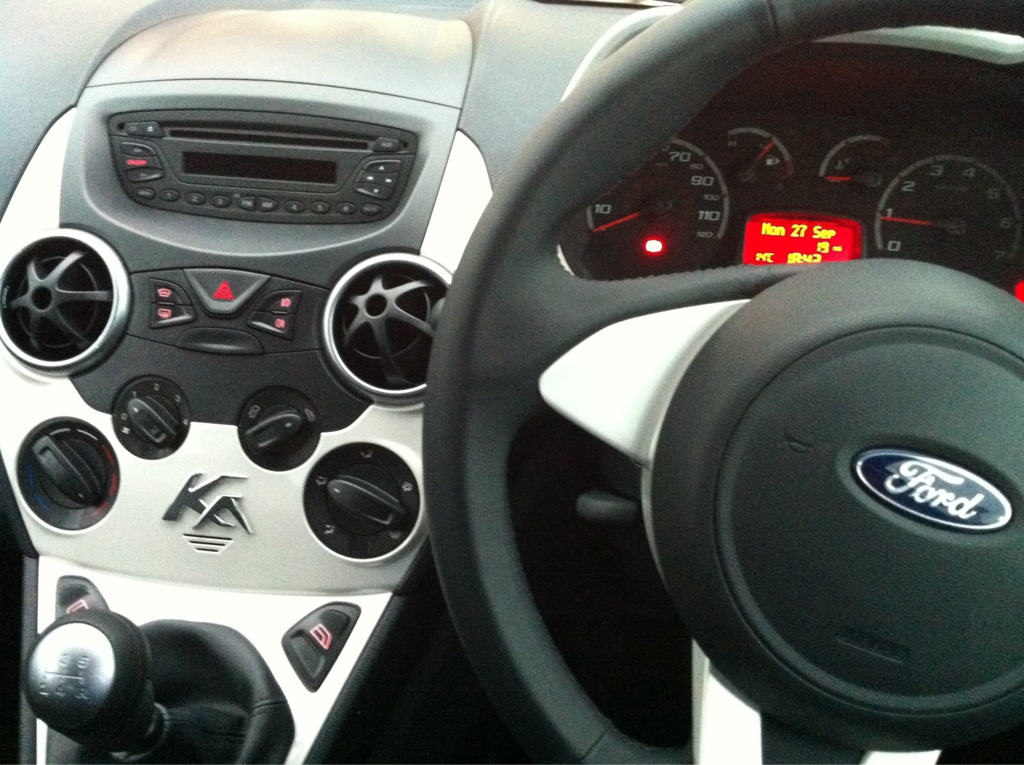
Interior

==== Ka Individual ====
Three "Ford Individual packs" were introduced with special characteristics each (in both the interior and exterior design), called Tattoo, Grand Prix, and Digital. the Tattoo was replaced in 2011 by the Metal. All Individual models are based on the Zetec.

=== Latin American version (B402) ===
Second generation (Latin America)
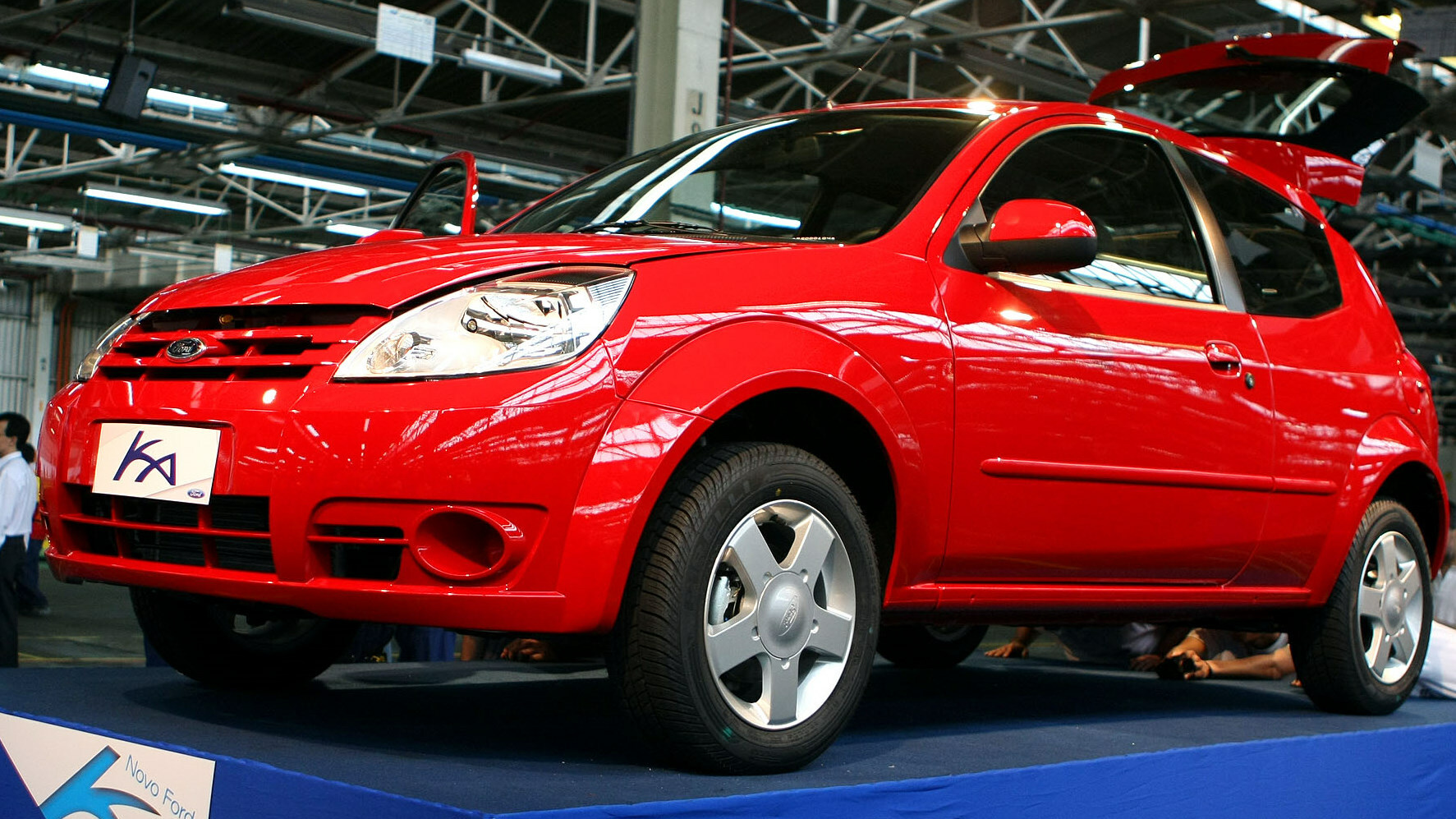

Overview
- Model code: B402
- Production: 2008–2013 (Latin America)
- Assembly: Brazil: São Bernardo do Campo (Ford Brazil)
- Designer: João Marcos Ramos (design manager)

Body and chassis
- Class: Subcompact car
- Body style: 3-door hatchback

Powertrain
- Engine: Petrol: 1.0 L Endura-E I4 flex fuel; 1.6 L Zetec I4 flex fuel
- Transmission: 5-speed IB5 manual

Dimensions
- Wheelbase: 2,452 mm (96.5 in)
- Length: 3,836 mm (151.0 in)
- Width: 1,641 mm (64.6 in)
- Height: 1,420 mm (55.9 in)
- Curb weight: 905–942 kg (1,995–2,077 lb)

The Latin American market received a separate model, which is based on the first-generation Ka chassis with redesigned exterior and interior design, adopting Ford's "Kinetic Design". It was introduced in December 2007 in Brazil, and went on sale in early January 2008 as a 2009 model year. The car was also exported to other markets in Latin America. However, it was not available in Mexico.

Developed under the B402 project code, the model was designed and engineered in Brazil. During development, 123 test prototypes were used, and involving 5,145 engineering tests and 430,000 km of durability tests. In the manufacturing plant at São Bernardo do Campo, the project included the replacement of 160 robots in the assembly line, as well as measuring machines and test stations.

In comparison to the original Ka, this model has a longer rear overhang and a redesigned rear seat to accommodate a fifth passenger. With a length of 3,836 mm (151.0 in), it competed in the subcompact car class. The boot capacity was increased from the previous generation 186 liters to a 263 liters.

It was available with 1.0-litre and 1.6-litre Zetec Rocam petrol flex engines, both are four-cylinder units. The 1.0-litre engine produces 70 hp (52 kW; 71 PS) with petrol fuel and 73 hp (54 kW; 74 PS) with ethanol fuel, while the 1.6-litre engine produces 102 hp (76 kW; 103 PS) with petrol fuel and 110 hp (82 kW; 112 PS) with ethanol fuel.

In 2011, Ford presented a mid-cycle facelifted version following the Kinect concept car. In Brazil, only the Sport version offers a 1.6-litre engine.

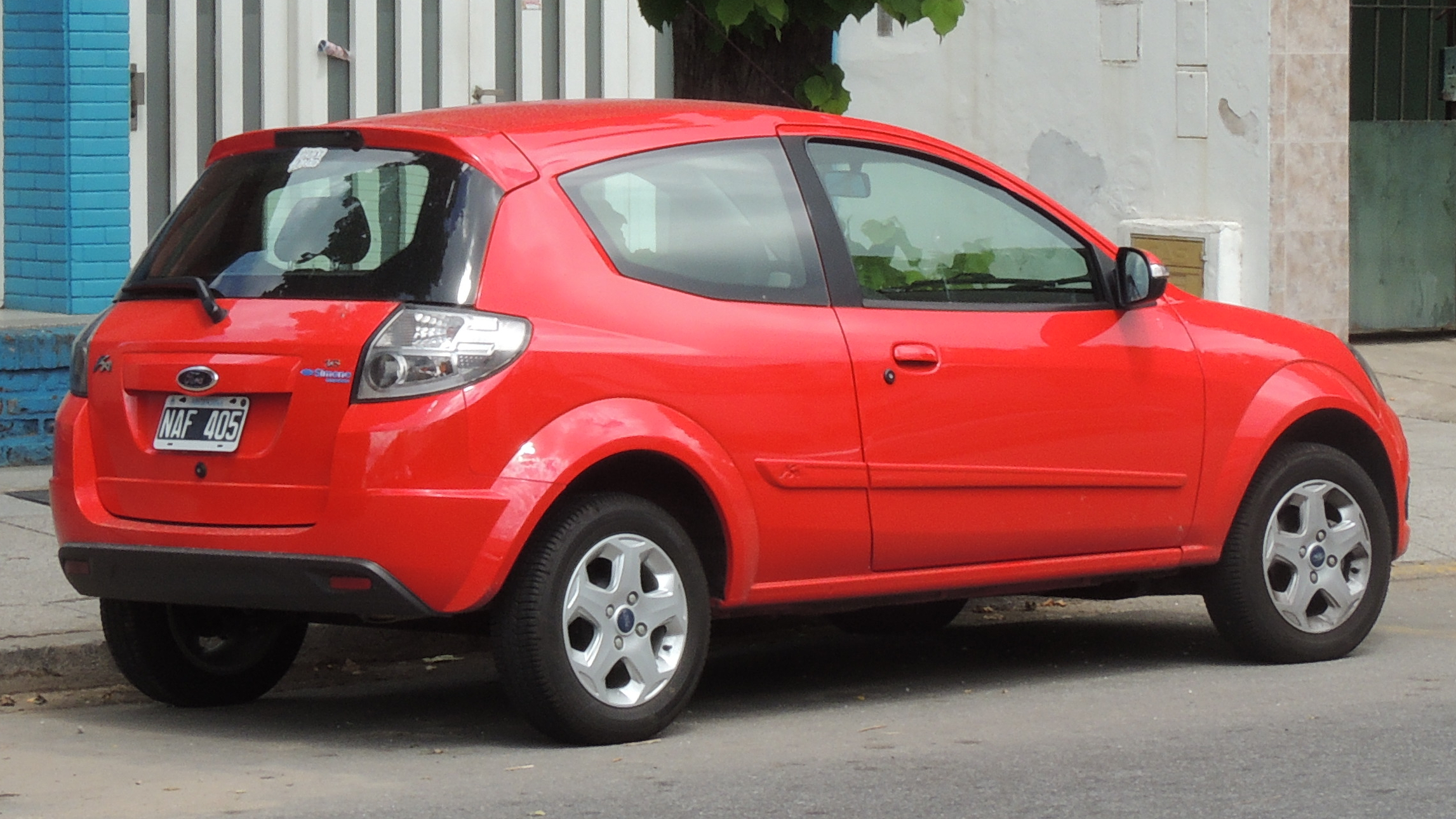
Rear view

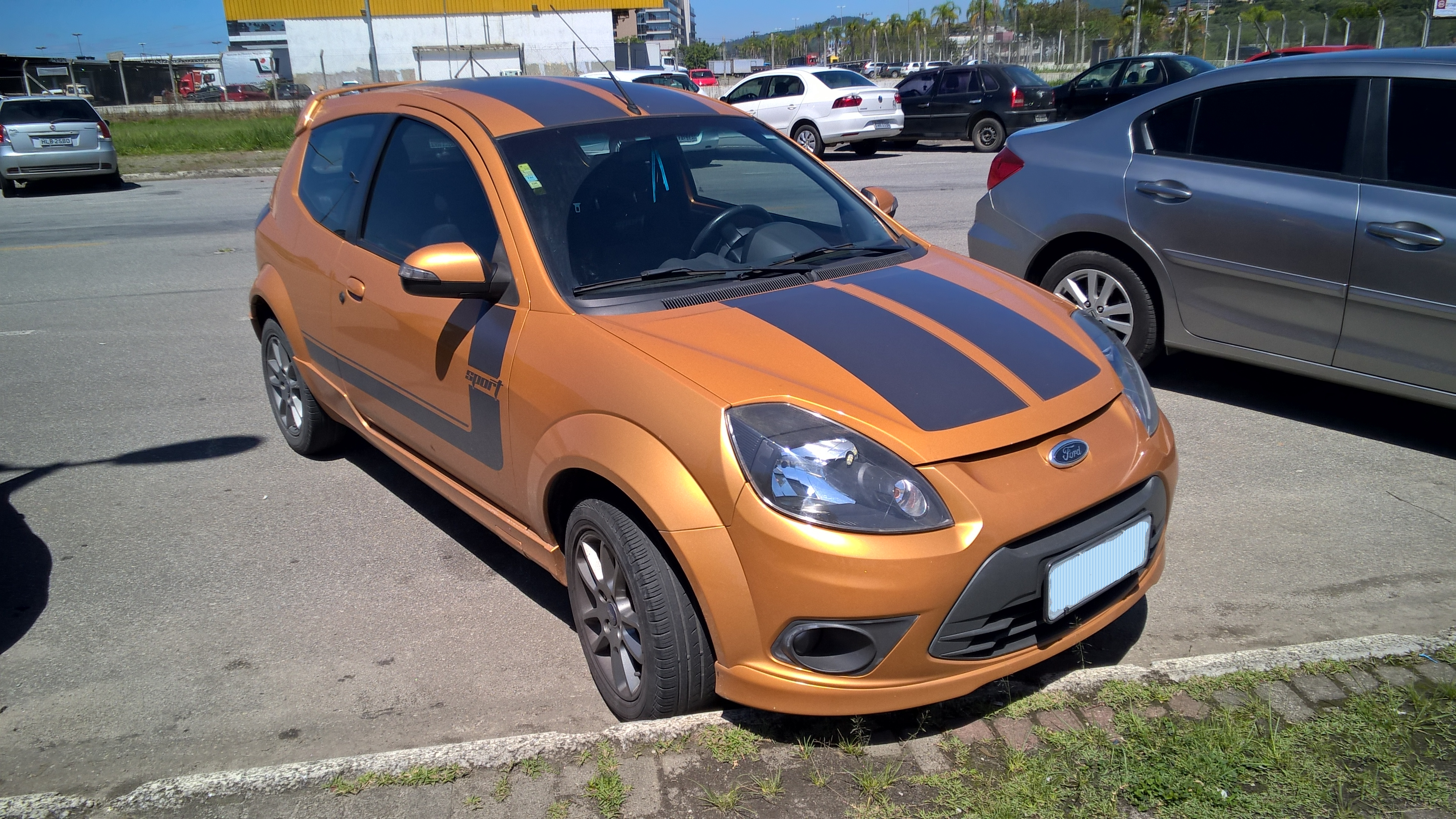
Ford Ka Sport

==== Safety ====
The Ka in its most basic Latin American market configuration with no airbags received 1 star for adult occupants and 3 stars for toddlers from Latin NCAP 1.0 in 2011.

Latin NCAP 1.0 test results Ford KA Fly Viral - NO Airbags (2011, based on Euro NCAP 1997)
Test	Points	Stars
Adult occupant:	2.37/17.0	1 /5 stars
Child occupant:	30.52/49.00	3 /5 stars

== Third generation (B562; 2014) ==
Third generation
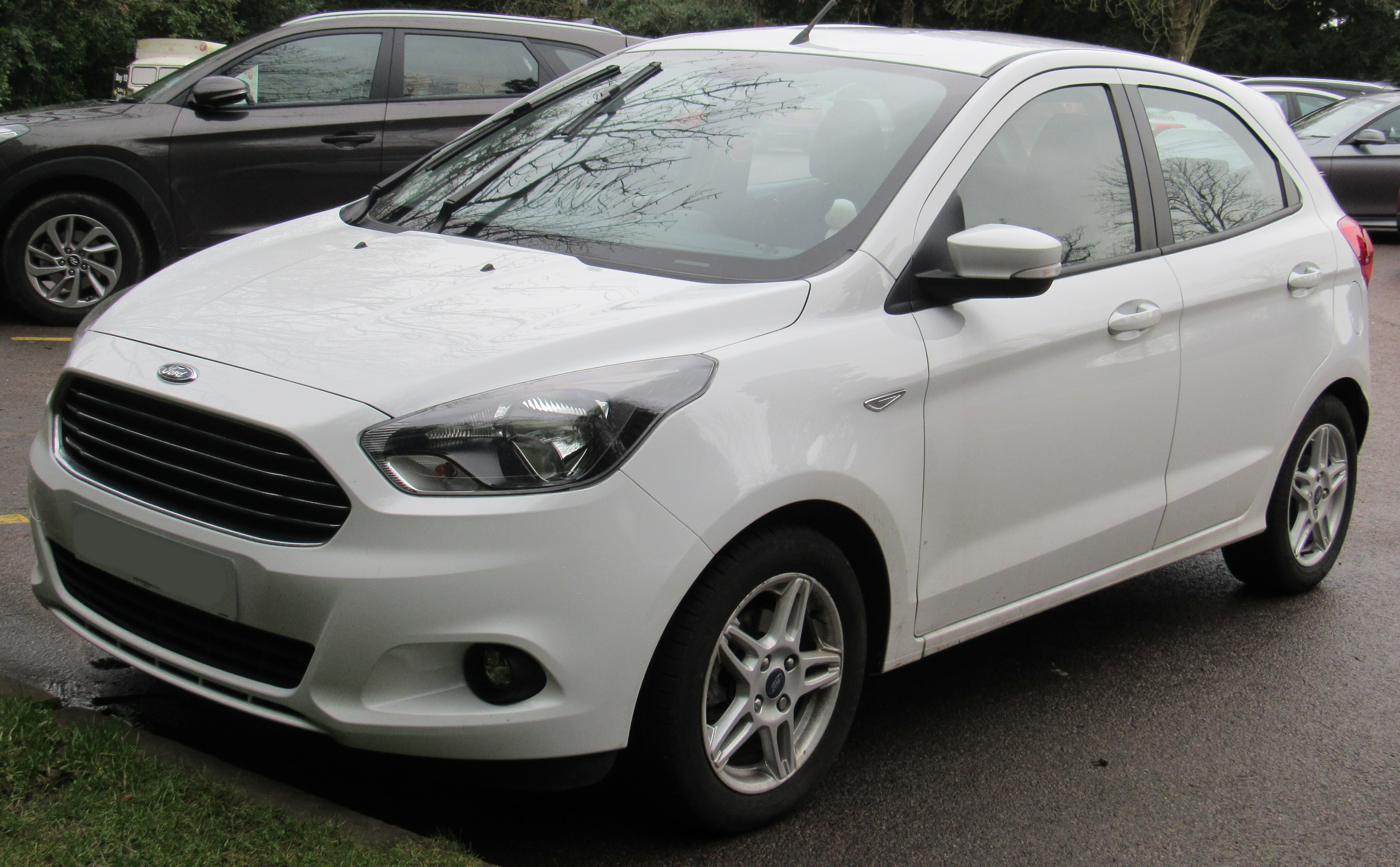
- Ford Ka+ (pre-facelift)

Overview
- Model code: B562
- Also called: Ford Figo (India, Mexico); Ford Aspire (sedan, India); Ford Freestyle (crossover version, India)
- Production: 2014–2020 (Europe); 2014–2021 (Brazil)
- Assembly: Brazil: Camaçari (Ford Brazil); India: Sanand, Gujarat (Ford India)
- Designer: Ehab Kaoud, Joao Marcos Ramos, James Conner, Robert T. Laster, Bonghoon L. Chung, Fabio Sandrin

Body and chassis
- Class: Subcompact car
- Body style: 5-door hatchback; 4-door sedan
- Platform: Ford global B-car platform
- Related: Ford Fiesta

Powertrain
- Engine: Petrol/Ethanol: 998 cc Fox I3; 1194 cc Dragon I3; 1196 cc Ti-VCT I4; 1497 cc Dragon I3; 1499 cc Duratec Ti-VCT I4; Diesel: 1498 cc DLD-415 Duratorq turbo I4
- Transmission: 5-speed manual; 6-speed automatic (PowerShift)

Dimensions
- Wheelbase: 2,491 mm (98.1 in)
- Length: 3,886–3,929 mm (153.0–154.7 in) (hatchback); 4,254 mm (167.5 in) (sedan, Brazil); 3,995 mm (157.3 in) (sedan, India)
- Width: 1,695 mm (66.7 in)
- Height: 1,525 mm (60.0 in)
- Kerb weight: 1,007–1,048 kg (2,220–2,310 lb)

Developed by Ford Brazil, the Ford Ka Concept was unveiled in Brazil in November 2013. The production version of this new Ford Ka appeared in July 2014, in hatchback and sedan body styles, with the first units arriving in Brazil in September and October 2014 respectively. The next market where it was launched was India, where the sedan made its debut as the new Ford Figo Aspire in August 2015, with the hatchback arriving (as the new Ford Figo) a month later. It was launched in Europe (as the Ka+) in June 2016.

The new model was based on Ford's global B platform, sharing its underpinnings with the Fiesta supermini, and embodies Ford's Kinetic 2.0 design theme. The hatchback is a five-door only model and it is now 266 mm (10.5 in) longer than the previous European model, with the wheelbase increased by 190 mm (7.5 in). The four-door sedan has the same wheelbase as the hatchback, but two length variants: a longer one in Brazil (dubbed Ka+), measuring 4,254 mm (167.5 in), and a shorter one exclusively in India (dubbed Aspire), measuring 3,995 mm (157.3 in).

In India, the range consists of either a 1.2-litre four-cylinder petrol, developing 65 kW (88 PS) and 112 N⋅m (83 lb⋅ft), a 1.5-litre four-cylinder diesel, developing 74 kW (100 PS) and 215 N⋅m (159 lb⋅ft), or a 1.5-litre four-cylinder petrol, developing 82 kW (112 PS) and 136 N⋅m (100 lb⋅ft). The latter is paired with Ford's six-speed automatic PowerShift transmission, while for the rest a five-speed manual option is available.

It features equipment such as the Ford's MyKey, MyDock, and SYNC systems, steering-mounted controls, automatic climate control, power-fold mirrors, keyless entry, electronic stability control, cruise control (in Europe), up to six airbags and high-strength steel body structure.

It was then launched in Mexico in September 2015, and in South Africa one month later. In March 2016, it was also introduced in Argentina.

The new Ka was produced at Ford's factories in Camaçari, Brazil, (from where it is exported to Argentina) until January 13, 2021, and in Sanand, Gujarat, India, (from where it was exported to Mexico, South Africa and Europe).

The Ka+ was discontinued in Europe in September 2019.

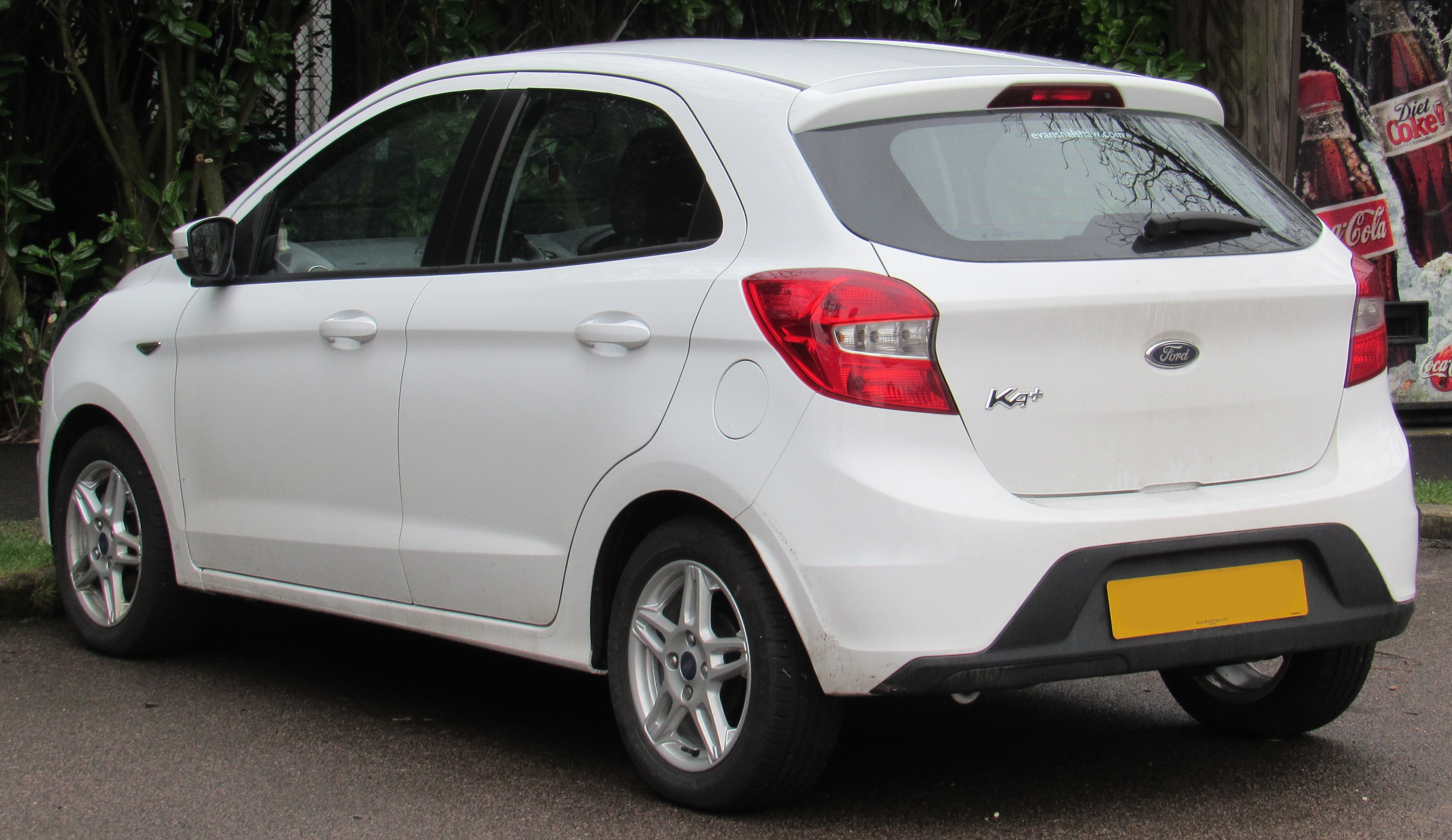
Ford Ka+ (pre-facelift)

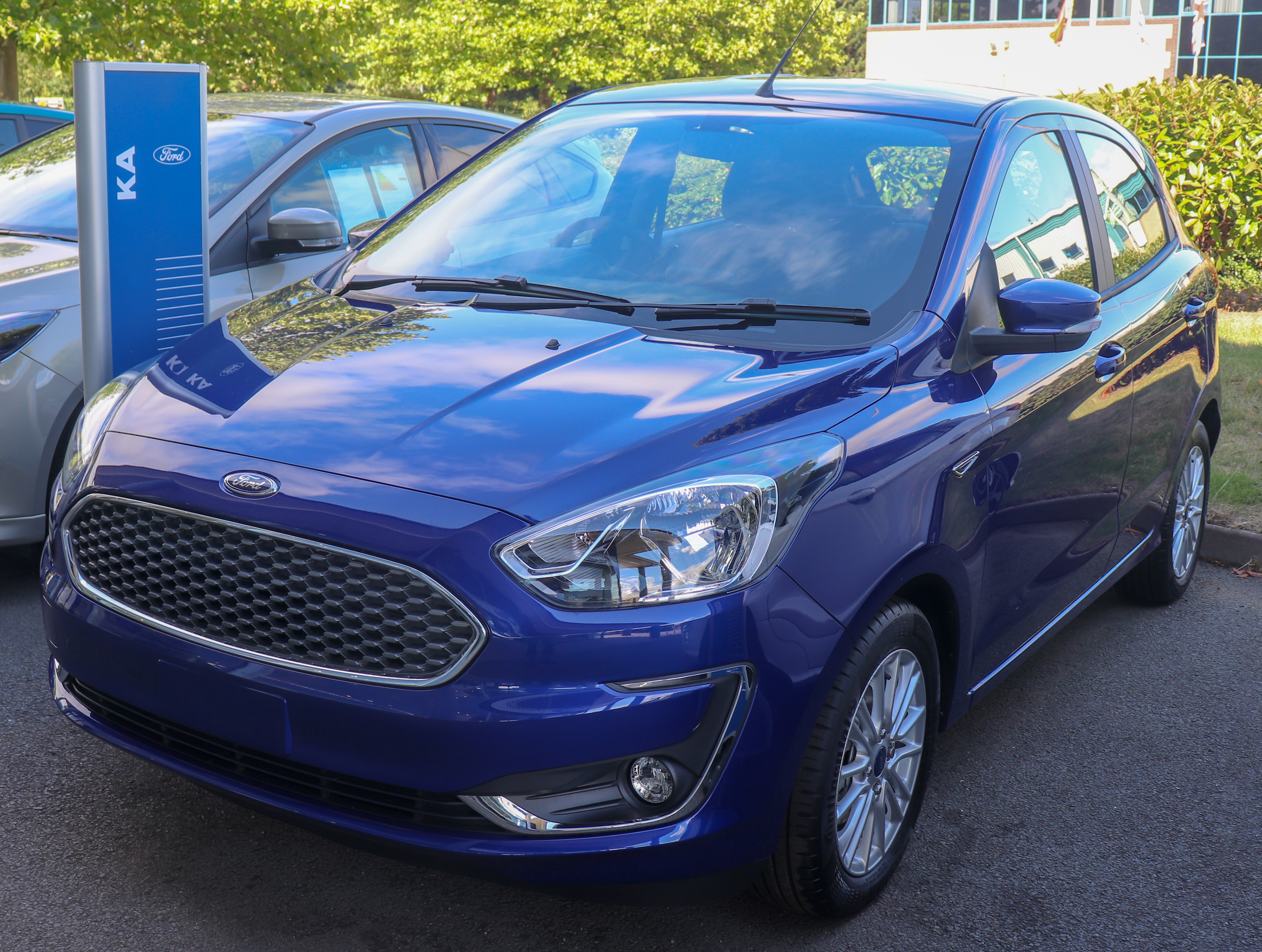
Ford Ka+ (facelift)

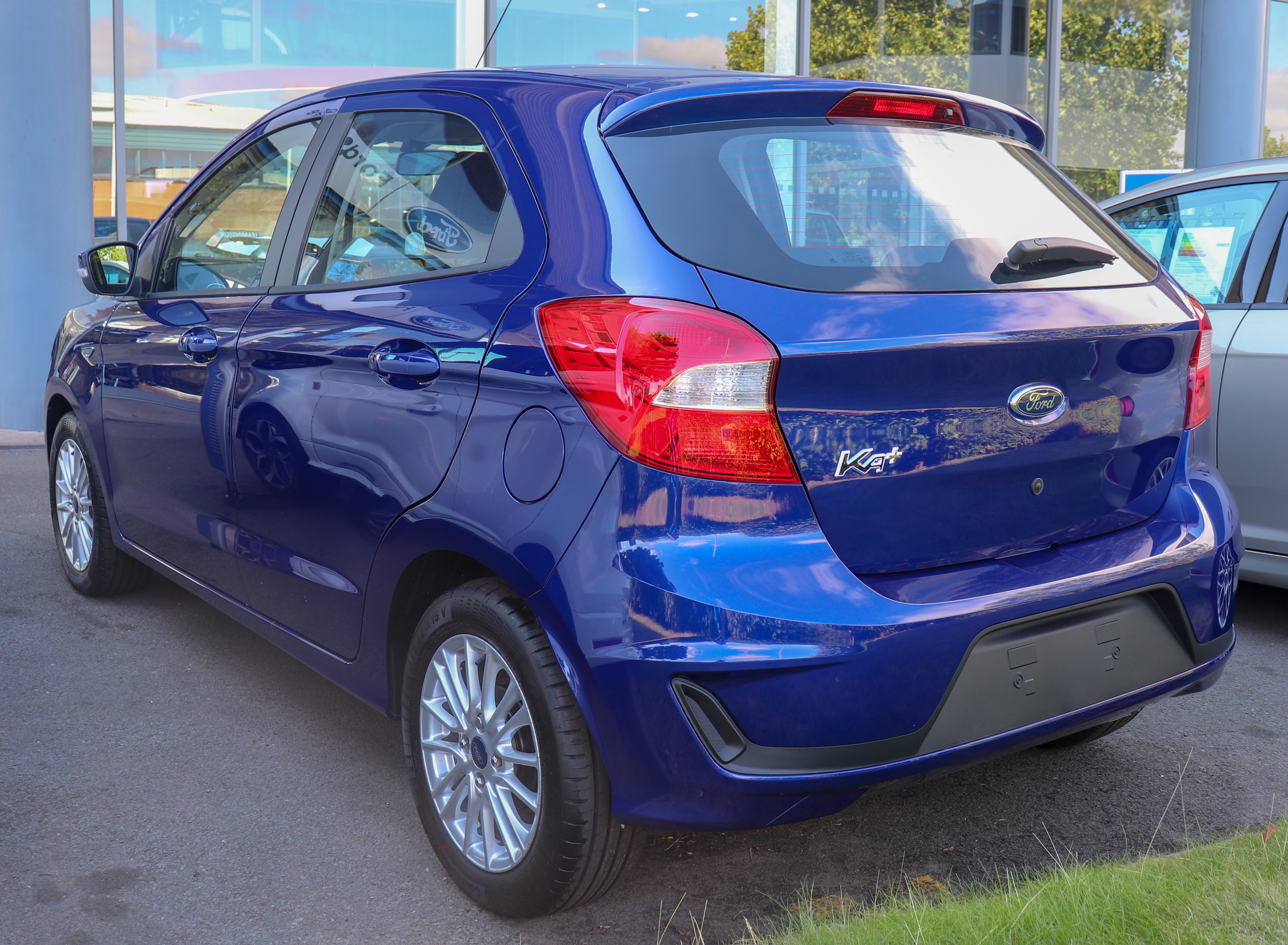
Rear view

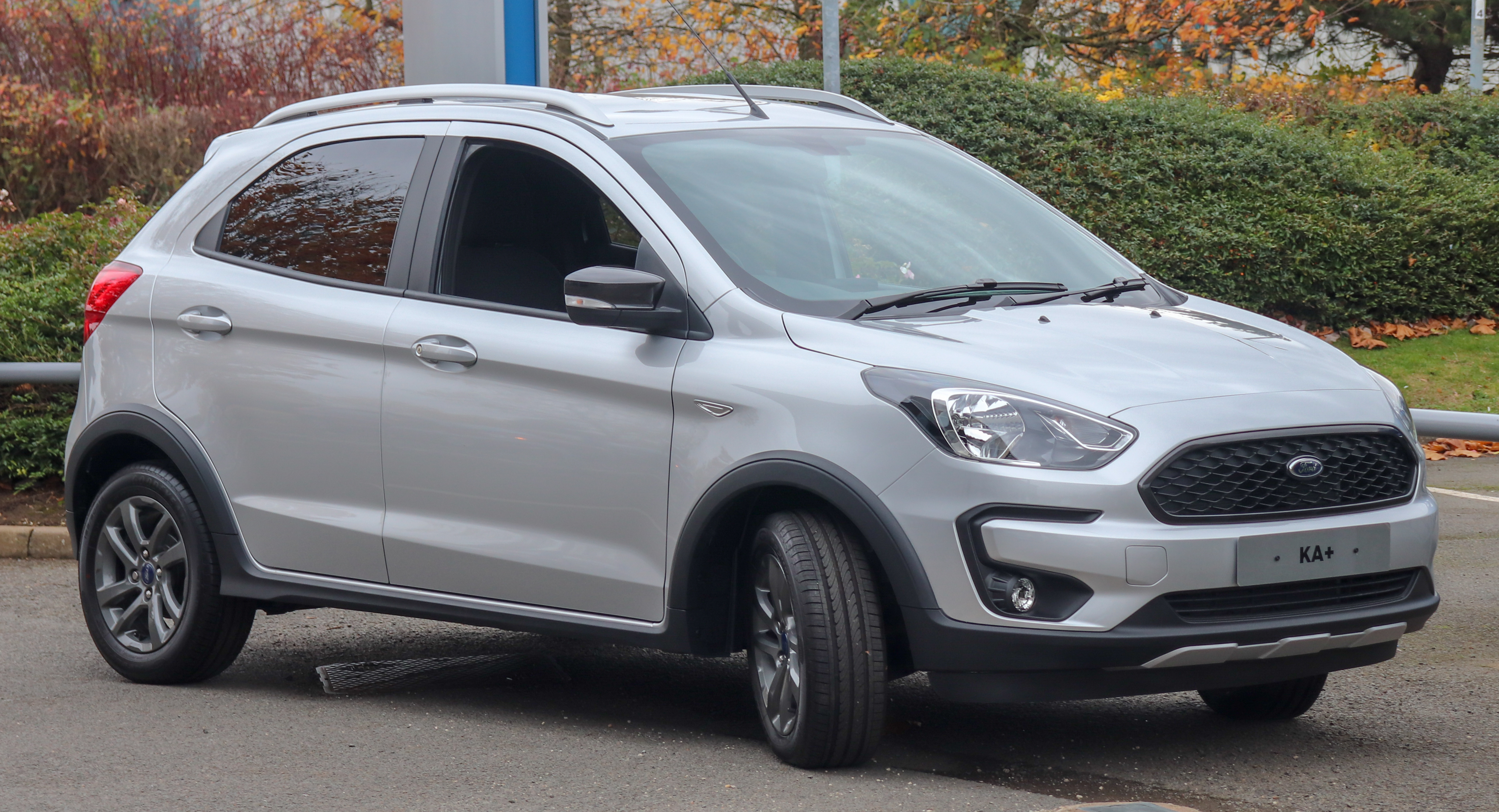
Ford Ka+ Active

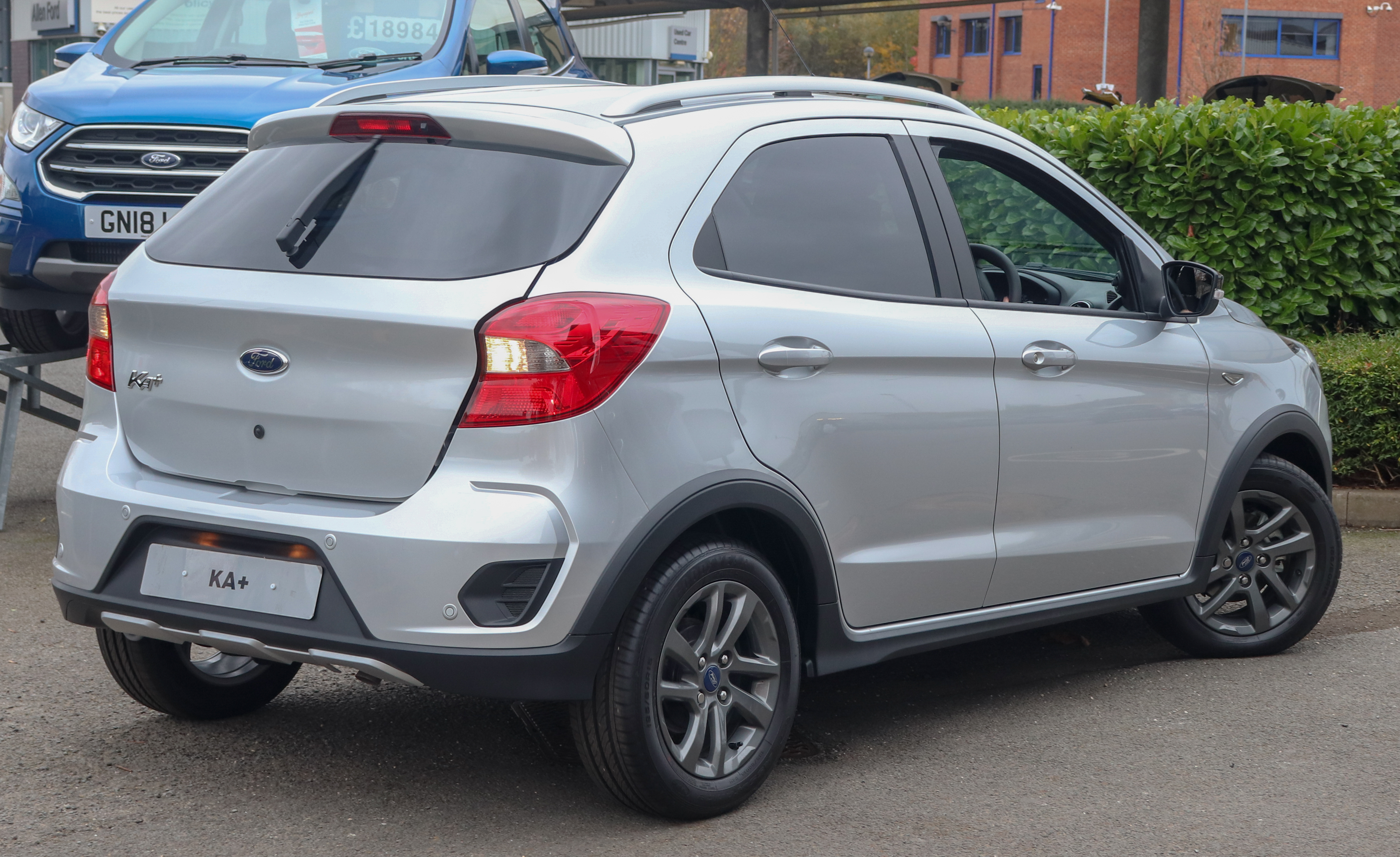
Rear view

=== Markets ===
==== Europe ====
The third-generation Ka was marketed in Europe as the Ka+. It was introduced in June 2016, with deliveries starting later that year. The '+' in the name shows the fact how Ford sees this as a budget B-segment car, rather than an A-segment car.

In Europe, the Ka+ came with only one engine, a 1.2-litre unit, that came with either 51 kW (70 PS), in the Studio or the Zetec trim levels, or 63 kW (85 PS), exclusively in the Zetec model.

==== Latin America ====
The new Ford Ka was introduced in the 2014 São Paulo Motor Show, becoming available on the market in August of that year and presented at the 2015 Buenos Aires Motor Show. The Ford Ka adopts the "Kinetic" design, presenting a more aggressive style, and it is slightly bigger than the previous model, adopting a five-door body, occupying the site of the former Ford Ka and Ford Fiesta One.

Also it adds a new body variant, a four-door sedan, called Ka+. In Brazil, it was offered with a choice of two petrol engines - a 1.0-litre three-cylinder, developing 59 kW (80 PS) and 100 N⋅m (74 lb⋅ft) or a 1.5-litre four-cylinder, developing 77 kW (105 PS) and 143 N⋅m (105 lb⋅ft). Gearbox options are limited to the well-known five-speed IB5+ for both the 1.0- and the 1.5-litre variants.

According to local press, the current 1.0 L version of the new 2014 Ka is the most economical compact car without a turbocharged engine, achieving up to 12 km/L of ethanol (E100) in the city of São Paulo. E33 fuel (Brazilian standard gasoline specification) economy facts had not been publicized, although owners claim it does about 1.0 to 2.5 km/L more than with E100.

Its Sigma 1.5 L-equipped version had been well received by the Brazilian market due to its relatively vigorous launches and good torque at low and midrange engine speeds.

=== Safety ===
In November 2015, a Ka+ model in its most basic Latin American market configuration with two standard front airbags and standard anti-lock braking system with electronic brakeforce distribution was tested by Latin NCAP 1.0 and was awarded four stars out of five for adult occupants and 3 stars for toddlers. In a frontal impact, the driver's head and chest were considered to receive adequate protection, the passenger's head and chest received good protection, while the driver's and passenger's knee areas received marginal protection. The bodyshell was rated as stable and was capable of withstanding further loading.

Latin NCAP 1.5 test results Ford Ka + 2 Airbags (2015, similar to Euro NCAP 2002)
Test	Points	Stars
Adult occupant:	12.17/17.0	4 /5 stars
Child occupant:	30.58/49.00	3 /5 stars

The Ka+ in its most basic Latin American market configuration with 2 airbags and no ESC received 0 stars for adult occupants and 3 stars for toddlers from Latin NCAP 2.0 in 2017.

Latin NCAP 2.0 test results Ford Ka / Figo + 2 Airbags (2017, based on Euro NCAP 2008)
Test	Points	Stars
Adult occupant:	0.00/34.0	0 /5 stars
Child occupant:	33.51/49.00	3 /5 stars

The updated Ka+ in its most basic Latin American market configuration and no ESC received 3 stars for adult occupants and 4 stars for toddlers from Latin NCAP 2.0 in 2018.

Latin NCAP 2.0 test results Ford KA + 2 Airbags (from 12/06/2018) (2018, based on Euro NCAP 2008)
Test	Points	Stars
Adult occupant:	22.83/34.0	3 /5 stars
Child occupant:	35.41/49.00	4 /5 stars

The Ka+ in its most basic Latin American market configuration with 2 airbags, driver pretensioner and no ESC received 0 stars from Latin NCAP 3.0 in 2020 (similar to Euro NCAP 2014).

Latin NCAP 3.0 test results Ford Ka + 2 Airbags (2020, similar to Euro NCAP 2014)
Test	Points	%
Overall:	0 /5 stars	
Adult occupant:	13.43	34%
Child occupant:	4.57	9%
Pedestrian:	24.05	50%
Safety assist:	3.00	7%

In March 2017, Euro NCAP released the results of the tests performed on the Ka+ in its standard European market configuration and it scored three out of five stars. For the adult occupants, it received a 73% rating, for the child occupant, a 61% rating, for the pedestrian, a 57% rating, and the safety assist category, a 29% rating. The car's performance in the tests was rated as "mediocre", being criticized for lacking rear seatbelt pretensioners and load limiters, poor chest protection in the full-width frontal crash test, and the lack of autonomous braking technology.

== UK Advertising controversy ==
In September 2003, Ogilvy & Mather created two advertisements for the Internet to advertise the Ford SportKa in the UK, which proved controversial when they received complaints for their content. Both commercials concluded with the graphic, "Ford SportKa. The Ka's evil twin."

The first commercial included a parked SportKa as a pigeon flies toward it, presumably to befoul it. When the pigeon is within range, the SportKa violently pops its bonnet, bashing the bird to its death. Despite receiving complaints from the Royal Pigeon Racing Association, Ford refused to take the ad down.

The second advertisement proved to be more controversial. It had the SportKa opening its sunroof as if enticing a nearby cat to peer in. When the cat climbed on the roof and peeked inside, the sunroof closed and beheaded the cat. This advert was not included in the initial campaign, but ended up being leaked on 1 April 2004, sparking controversy worldwide. Ford apologized for the advert, claiming it was not sanctioned by them or the agency; by the time the advert was leaked, the original "Evil Twin" website was no longer operating.
