= Claude Lobo =

Automotive designer

- Born: August 20, 1943; Paris
- Died: June 3, 2011 (aged 67)
- Occupation: Car designer
- Years active: 1966-1999
- Known for: Designer of Ford automobiles
- Children: 2

Claude Lobo (20 August 1943 – 3 June 2011) was an automotive designer who served in various design positions at Ford Motor Company over 32 years, playing a prominent role in designing Ford automobiles including the Ford Capri (Mk I), Mercury Cougar (Mk VII), Ford Ka (Mk I) and Ford Focus (Mk I) – while pioneering innovations including the development of Computer Aided Design.

Born in Paris, France in 1943, Lobo studied at the city's Technical College and the Academy of Applied Arts.

== Career at Ford ==
After designing for an electric appliance company and later for Chrysler-Simca, Lobo joined Ford of Germany in 1966, as a designer. In 1967, Lobo became Manager of Exterior Design at what became Ford of Europe, where he held a number of senior design posts, including assignments in small, medium and large car and truck design – and became chief designer of Advanced Program Definition and Computer Aided Design (CAD) in 1987.

In 1994, Lobo became Director of Ford Motor Company's Advanced Design Studio in Dearborn, Michigan, leading development of several concept vehicles including the Ford Indigo, Synergy 2010 and the Mercury MC4. Lobo continued to assist with further implementation of Computer Aided Design technology at Ford, e.g., coordinating the CAD system at Ford with advanced model-milling CNC machinery as well as coordinating the CAD systems between Ford and its subsidiary Mazda.

Lobo returned to Ford of Europe in 1997 as Director of Design, where he was responsible for the development of the European Car of the Year, the Mk I Ford Focus.

== Ford Ka and Focus ==
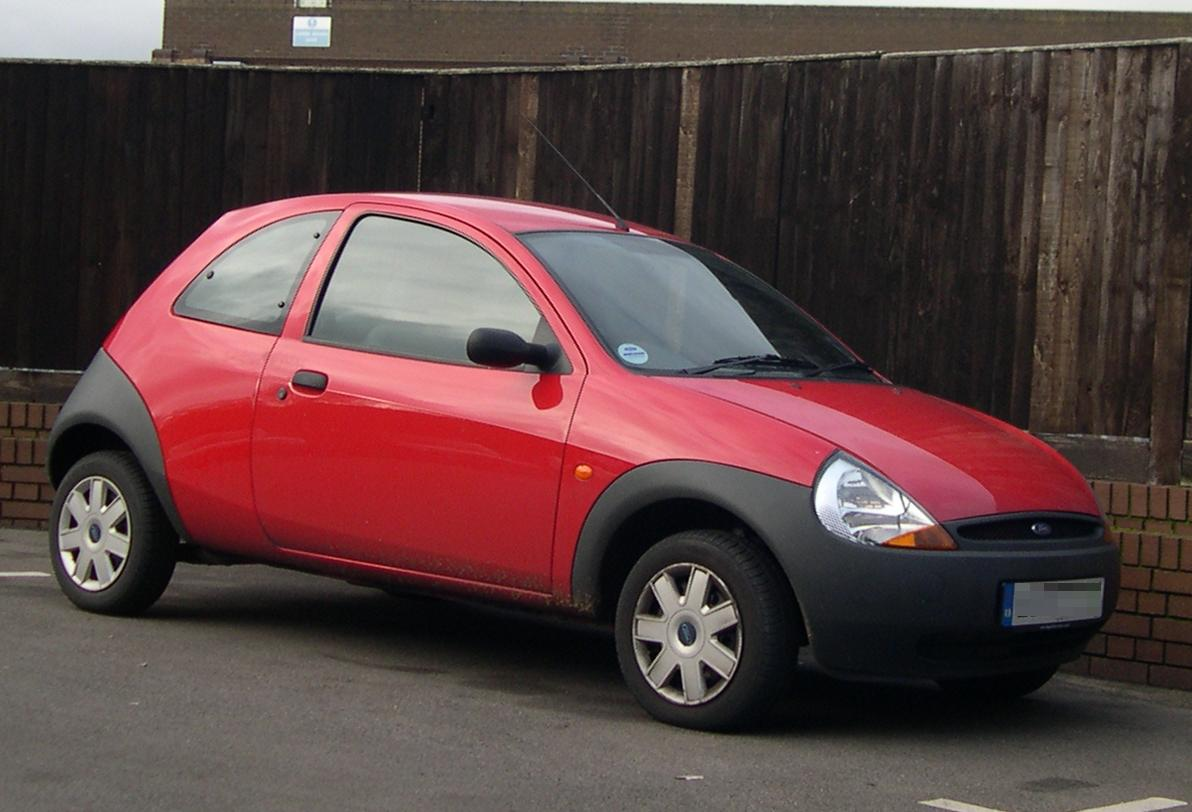
2005 Ford Ka

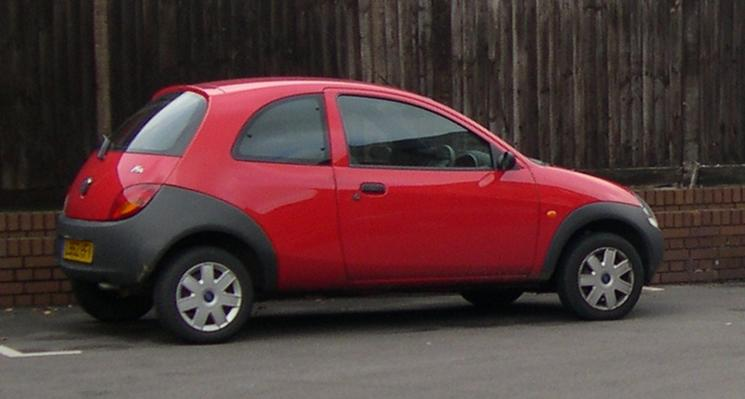
2005 Ford Ka

As chief designer on the Ford Ka, Lobo has spoken about his original role, influences on the design, the importance at the time of creating an enduring design, and how the design aged:

When we decided to do the car, I said to Jac (Jacques Nasser) that we can try to do something new and different because it was a new entry in our brand. He agreed to that and gave me carte blanche."

We wanted to do an anti-Twingo. The Twingo, as such, is a very clever car; it's a mini-minivan, but we couldn't repeat it. I was not willing to do that. My philosophy was really inspired by the original Mini; I wanted to design a car that was so strong in its appearance and thinking that we wouldn't have to carry out a mid-life facelift. When I presented the Ka to the board in the US, I told them that we either sell it and sell it well or you scrap it – but you cannot facelift it."

I still feel very good about it,' says original designer Claude Lobo. 'In fact, we have three in the family. It drives nicely and has very good suspension – it's almost like a go-kart. Every time I see one in the street, I'm pleased with it. It's aged very well and, unlike other cars, it hasn't lost its charisma after four or five years. At the beginning, it wasn't easy to convince management and marketing because we were a little bit too far out there, but if you look at it now I think we were right."

Regarding the design of the Focus, Lobo was a smoker and located the ashtray high on the instrument panel, enabling the driver to use the ashtray without removing his hands from the steering wheel.

== Retirement and personal life ==
Lobo retired in 1999 at age 55 from Ford Motor Company. Shortly thereafter, in 2000, he created the Concours d'Elegance d´Automobiles Classiques de Bergerac with Nicole and Jean Descamps. Lobo continued to participate in both internal Ford design competitions and design competitions outside the company, e.g. the 2003 Grand Concours International du Design Automobile, Lille, France.

Lobo had been a professional race car driver in the early 1970s, winning the 24 Hours Nürburgring sports car race and the Marathon de la Route driving a Ford Capri RS with Klaus Ludwig. Lobo also competed in the 24 Hours of Le Mans, – and had been known drive a Ford GT40 as his personal vehicle.

Lobo was married and father of two children, Alexandre and Nathalie.
