= Ford Indigo =

Concept car developed by Ford in 1996

Overview
- Manufacturer: Ford Motor Company
- Production: 1996; 2 built (1 functional prototype, 1 static prototype)
- Designer: Claude Lobo

Body and chassis
- Class: Concept car
- Body style: 2-door speedster
- Layout: Rear mid-engine, rear-wheel-drive
- Doors: Scissor

Powertrain
- Engine: 6.0 L DOHC V12
- Power output: 435 hp (441 PS; 324 kW)
- Transmission: 6-speed electro-hydraulic sequential manual

Dimensions
- Wheelbase: 114 in (2,896 mm)
- Length: 175.3 in (4,453 mm)
- Width: 82 in (2,083 mm)
- Height: 39.5 in (1,003 mm)
- Curb weight: 2,300 lb (1,043 kg) (estimated)

The Ford Indigo was a concept car developed by American automobile manufacturer Ford for the 1996 auto show circuit and designed by Ford's design and technical director Claude Lobo. Only two examples were built, of which only of them one was actually functional. It took Ford six months from the original computer designs to the finished show car. The functional concept is still owned by Ford. The non-functioning show car was auctioned off to Jack Roush.

== History ==
The Indigo was developed to showcase Ford's Indy car technologies, including new materials and construction techniques as well as powertrain and aerodynamic enhancements. The monocoque chassis was developed in conjunction with Reynard Motorsport as a single piece tub made of a carbon fiber composite material, to which the suspension is directly attached. The suspension was a direct copy, in both design and materials, to Reynard's various Indy cars, needing only slight modifications to allow for a two-passenger layout.

== Specifications and performance ==
The working Indigo had a 6.0 L V12 48 valve DOHC engine which used the pistons, rings, rods and the valve train from Ford's Duratec V6 engine found in the Taurus and Mercury Sable. The engine had no relation to the V12 used in the GT90 concept unveiled a year earlier (using parts from the Modular V8), despite both having the same displacement. The engine had a power output of 435 hp (324 kW; 441 PS) at 6,100 rpm and 405 lb⋅ft (549 N⋅m) of torque at 5,250 rpm. This engine would later go on to power many cars manufactured by Aston Martin which was owned by Ford until 2007. The engine was bolted directly to the chassis, and was a load-bearing member for some suspension components, as was found with most Indy cars. The transaxle was a 6 speed unit with a manual clutch, and steering wheel mounted push button gear shifting, developed by Reynard for its Indy cars. Ford claimed that the engine was so efficient that it should have been capable of 28 mpg_{‑US} (8.4 L/100 km; 34 mpg_{‑imp}) on the highway. Five of these engines were built by Cosworth as commissioned by Ford are kept by the company.

The Indigo used Fikse three-piece modular wheels (measuring 17x11.5-inch at the front and 18x12.5-inch at the rear) wrapped in wide tires supplied by Goodyear. The steering was a modified rack and pinion power assisted unit borrowed from the Taurus. The brakes were from Brembo, with the rotors measuring 13.2-inch at the front and 14.0-inch at the rear. The Indigo was estimated to accelerate to 60 mph (97 km/h) in 4 seconds and could attain a theoretical top speed of 180 mph (290 km/h).

== Design and features ==
The carbon fiber and fibreglass body of the car had scissor style doors for easy access to the car, High-intensity discharge lamps mounted on the rear view mirrors, deep leather bucket seats, a premium stereo, air-conditioning, and a four-point racing harness enhanced the road friendly character of the car. The interior employed an LCD screen behind the steering wheel to display the vital information of the car to the driver. The low, wedge shaped design of the car incorporated a shark nose at the front with an attached front spoiler and an integrated rear spoiler in the bodywork for improved aerodynamics. The front spoiler also housed the LED turn indicators while the rear spoiler housed the neon-tube tail light assembly. The car did away with front and rear fenders with small fenders covering the exposed wide tires. The static show car had a visor for protection of the occupants from wind while the working prototype did away with the visor.

== Other media ==
The car was featured in the PC/PlayStation arcade racing game Need for Speed II as a class B car, in Roadsters, in Ford Racing 2, Ford Racing 3, in the Promat arcade game 96 Flag Rally and also in the Xbox 360 game Project Gotham Racing 3 as the "Ford Super Car Concept".
