= Chris Svensson =

British automobile designer (1965–2018)

Christopher Svensson
- Born: 12 December 1965; Sunderland, England
- Died: 21 July 2018 (aged 52); Michigan, US
- Occupation: car designer
- Spouse: Sonia Mann
- Children: 2

Christopher Svensson (12 December 1965 – 21 July 2018) was a British automobile designer known for innovative Ford cars of the 1990s.

== Early life ==
He was born in Sunderland. His grandfather was Swedish. He left school to do a foundation art course at Sunderland Polytechnic. He enrolled at the Royal College of Art in 1990, and graduated with a Master of Arts degree in 1992.

== Career ==
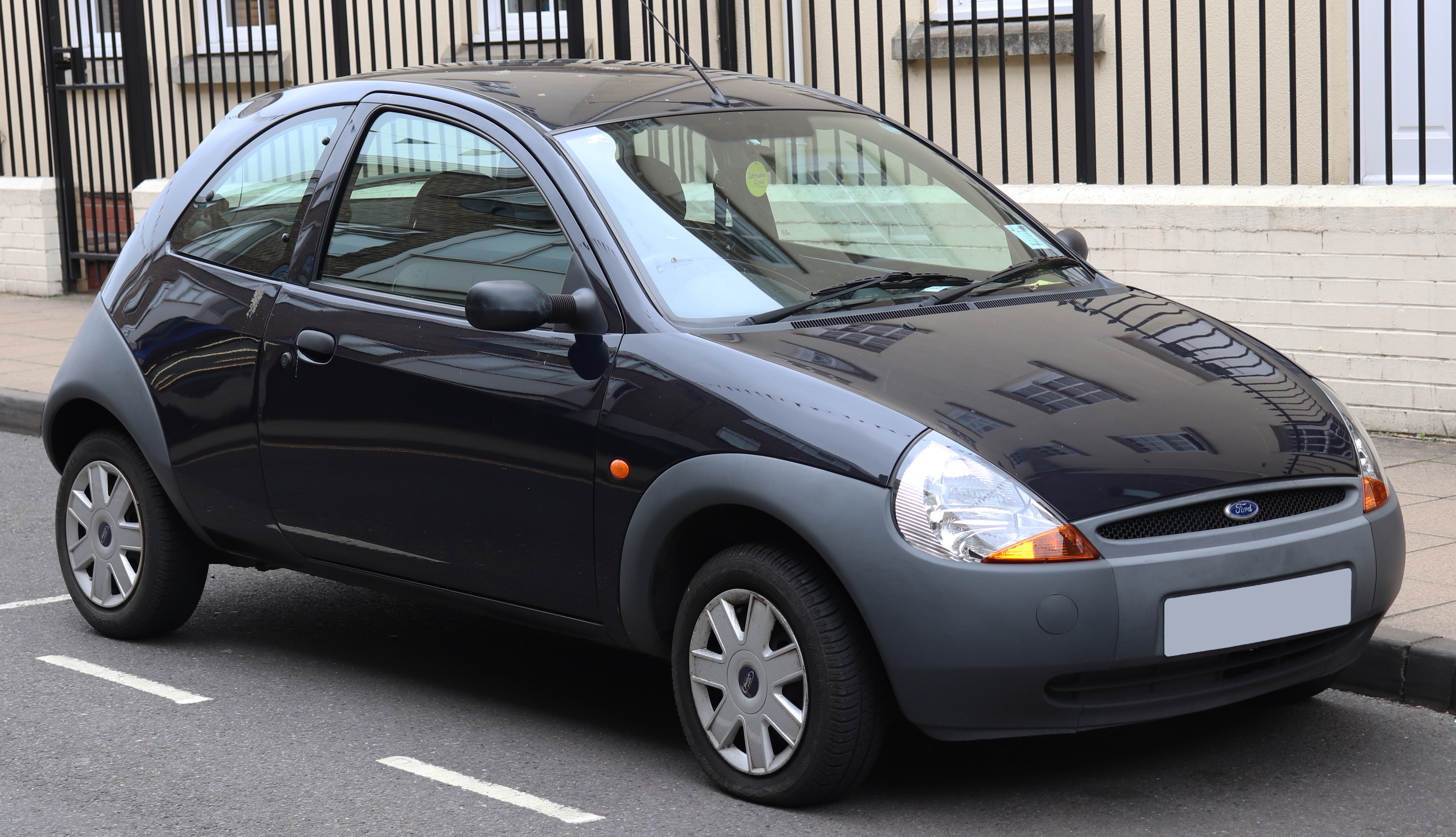
His 1992 design resulted in the Ford Ka in 1996

=== Ford ===
He joined Ford in 1992, as an exterior designer with Ford Germany (Ford-Werke GmbH). He is known for his work on the innovative Ford Ka, which was launched in September 1996. He designed it at Ford in Cologne, and the design owed much to his graduation show of 1992.

In 2008, he began work on the Ford Kinetic Design third-generation of the Ford Focus, which is the version in production since 2010, built at Saarlouis Body & Assembly in Germany.

In January 2012, he became Design Director of Asia Pacific & Africa, at Ford Australia in Campbellfield, Victoria. In January 2014, he became Design Director of The Americas, overseeing the styling of the 2015 Ford GT.

== Personal life ==
He married Sonia Mann in December 1996 in Ampthill, then a part of the Mid Bedfordshire District. He met her at the Royal College of Art, where she was studying textiles. They have twin daughters together, born in November 2000. Svensson last lived in Dearborn, Michigan, and formerly lived in Cold Norton, Essex. Svensson died of cancer on 21 July 2018, at the age of 52.

== See also ==
- J Mays
