= Martin Smith (designer) =

British automobile designer (born 1949)

Martin Smith (born 1949) is a British retired automobile designer, noted for extensive stints at Audi, Opel and Ford of Europe.

== Background ==
Born in 1949 in Broomhill, Sheffield, England, Smith attended King Edward VII School. A car fanatic since he was a boy, he wrote letters to Mini designer Alec Issigonis asking how to become a car designer and received kindly and encouraging replies. He studied engineering at the University of Liverpool before graduating with a master's degree in vehicle design from the Royal College of Art in London.

== Career ==
=== Audi ===
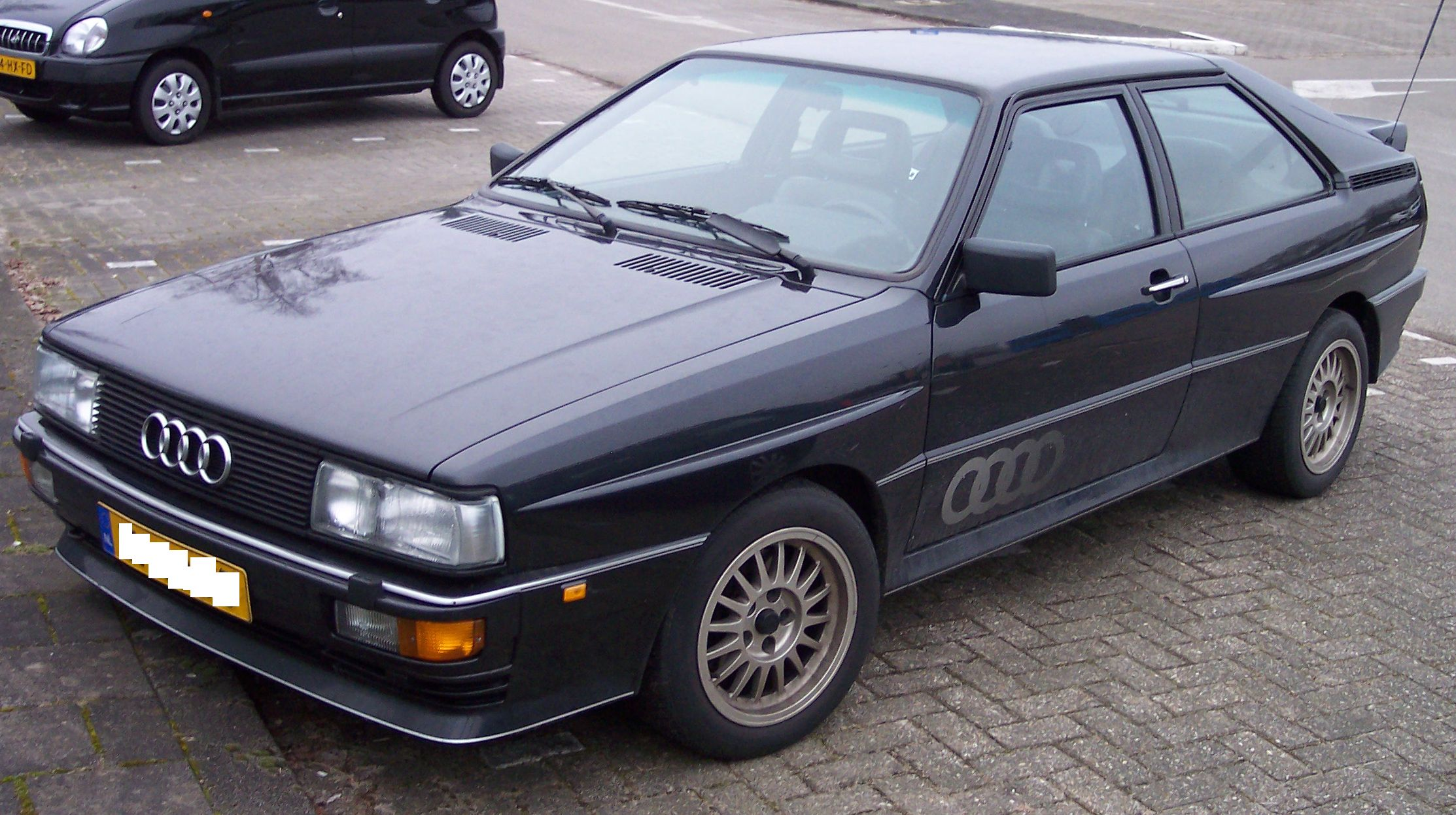
Audi Quattro

Having begun his career at Porsche in 1973 which also included a short stint working on commercial vehicles for Ogle Design in Letchworth, Smith moved to Audi in 1977, then briefly to BMW only to return to Audi where he would remain for the majority of the 1980s and 1990s. At Audi he transformed the mundane Audi Coupe into the legendary Audi Quattro and subsequently became Head of Audi's Munich Design Studio. He helped introduce a slippery aerodynamic look and austere functional cockpits to the Audi range as evidenced by the 1982 Audi 100 and 1986 Audi 80. Whilst in charge of the Audi Munich Design Studio, he worked with J Mays on the 1991 Audi Avus Quattro concept car which previewed a geometrical style as well as the extensive use of aluminium. His last position at Audi was the Head of Interior Design where he oversaw and developed the first generation Audi TT interior.

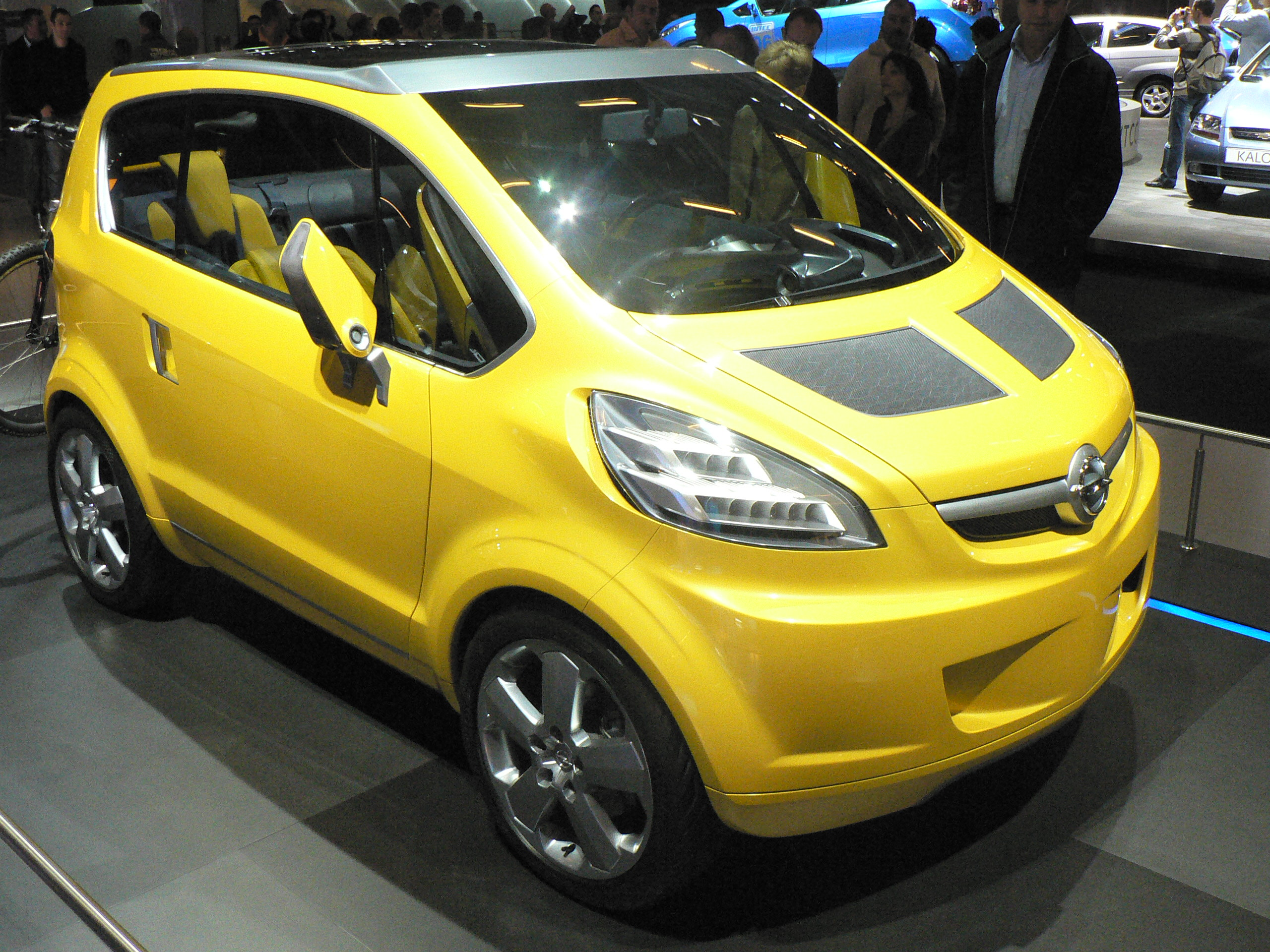
Opel Trixx

=== Opel ===
In 1997 he moved to Opel as design director for compact cars, working on the Opel Speedster and the 2004 Astra. In 2002 he became Executive Design Director for Opel responsible for the design of the entire product line-up and where he realigned Opel design from the inoffensive but bland of the 1990s to a more dynamic direction in line with his 2004 Opel Trixx, Opel Astra, Insignia concept and Vauxhall VX Lightning. Under his guidance, this new direction influenced the whole Opel range including the 2004 Opel Tigra TwinTop, 2005 Opel Zafira, 2005 facelift of the Opel Vectra/Opel Signum, the 2006 Opel Corsa, and 2007 Opel Antara.

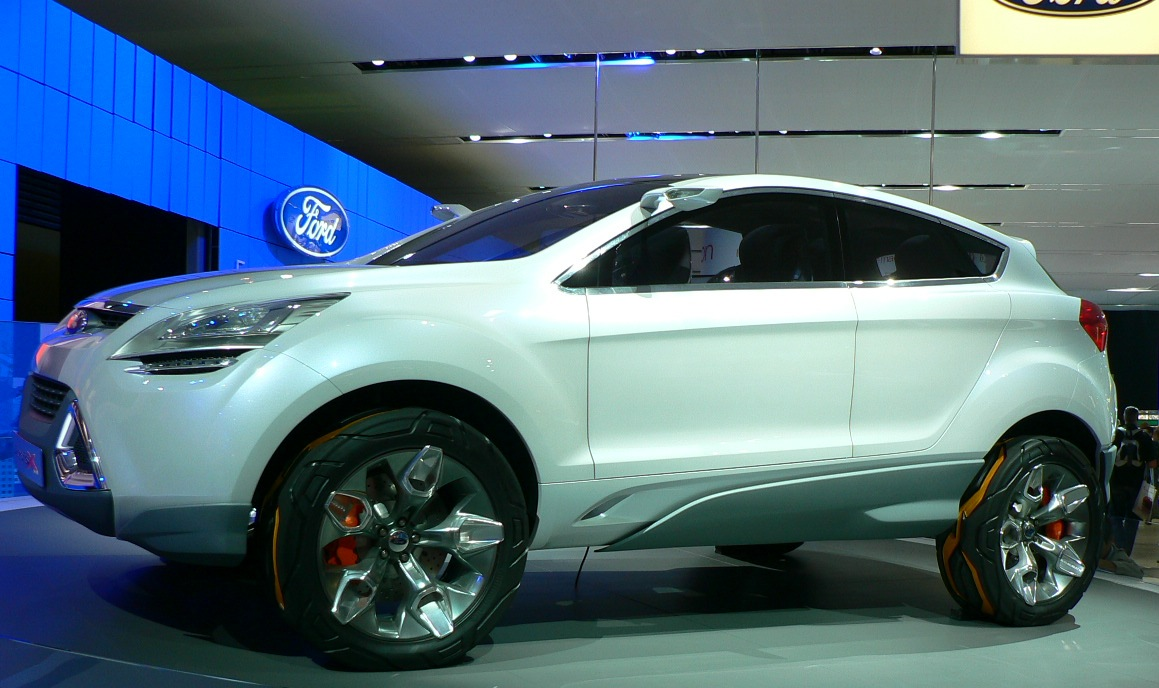
Ford Iosis X

=== Ford ===
In 2004 Ford's European Design staff underwent a comprehensive reorganisation, the first step coming in July 2004 seeing Smith lured from Opel to become Executive Design Director for Ford of Europe, where he reports to the Ford global group Vice President for Design, former colleague J Mays. This was quickly followed by fellow Opel refugee Stefan Lamm joining in autumn 2004 as Chief Designer for Exteriors at Ford. Smith was also reunited with another former colleague, Chris Bird, who moved to Ford as design director from Audi in 1998. This reorganised staff quickly made its aims clear: to move Ford of Europe design its New Edge design philosophy towards the ethos of 'Kinetic Design' which roughly translates to 'Energy in Motion', a language that consists of clean angles and complex surfacing to give Fords a sportier, more dynamic, exciting look. This language was first implemented by Smith and his team on the Ford SAV Concept, and has progressively been developed in a series of other concepts including the Ford Iosis, Iosis X and Verve concepts. These designs, or at least elements of these designs, have increasingly been adopted on production models, with the 2006 Ford S-MAX, 2006 Ford Galaxy, 2007 Ford Mondeo, and 2008 Ford Kuga all designed within the Kinetic Design paradigm. Under Smith's leadership, the Ford of Europe design team rolled out Kinetic Design onto numerous models including: the 2007 Ford C-MAX Facelift, 2008 Ford Focus Facelift, 2008 Ford Fiesta, 2008 Ford Ka, 2009 Ford C-MAX, and 2012 Ford B-MAX. In line with the One Ford strategy, Smith and his team were given lead responsibility for the global 2010 Ford Focus, whilst also supporting the development of the 2013 Ford Fusion and 2014 Ford Mondeo. In addition to his responsibilities at Ford of Europe; Smith has since May 2006 also been responsible for overseeing vehicle design in the Australian, Chinese and Asia-Pacific markets, with the task of giving the line-up a more consistent look.

== Retirement ==
In May 2014 it was announced that Smith would be stepping down as Executive Design Director for Ford of Europe in July 2014, to be succeeded by Joel Piaskowski, before retiring completely from Ford in December 2014. In his last 6 months of Ford he worked on a global project studying the future direction of Ford design, working closely with Moray Callum, vice president, Design, Ford Motor Company.
