= Ford Kinetic Design =

Style of automobile design

Kinetic Design is the name given to a style of automobile design used by Ford Motor Company for many of its passenger vehicles in the late 2000s and early 2010s.

Developed by the design studios of Ford of Europe in Germany and Britain, it replaced New Edge, and was first shown in 2005 with the SAV concept. Kinetic Design or Kinetic Design elements have featured on the Ford Ka from the 2008 model onward, the Ford Fiesta (as well as the Ford Verve concept) from the 2008 model onward, the Ford Focus from the 2008 model onward, the Ford C-MAX from the 2007 model onward, the Ford Kuga, the Ford Mondeo from the 2007 model onward, the Ford S-MAX and the Ford Galaxy from the 2006 model onward.

Common features of Kinetic Design is the large, lower trapezoidal grille which may resemble an opened mouth; geometric shaped fog lights to the side; long, straight creases along the side; and headlights that seem to stretch out from the front.

== History ==
The Ford Kinetic Design was first seen when Ford unveiled the Ford Iosis concept. It was later phased out in 2012 starting with the facelifted Ford Fiesta and replaced by Kinetic Design 2.0.

== Gallery ==
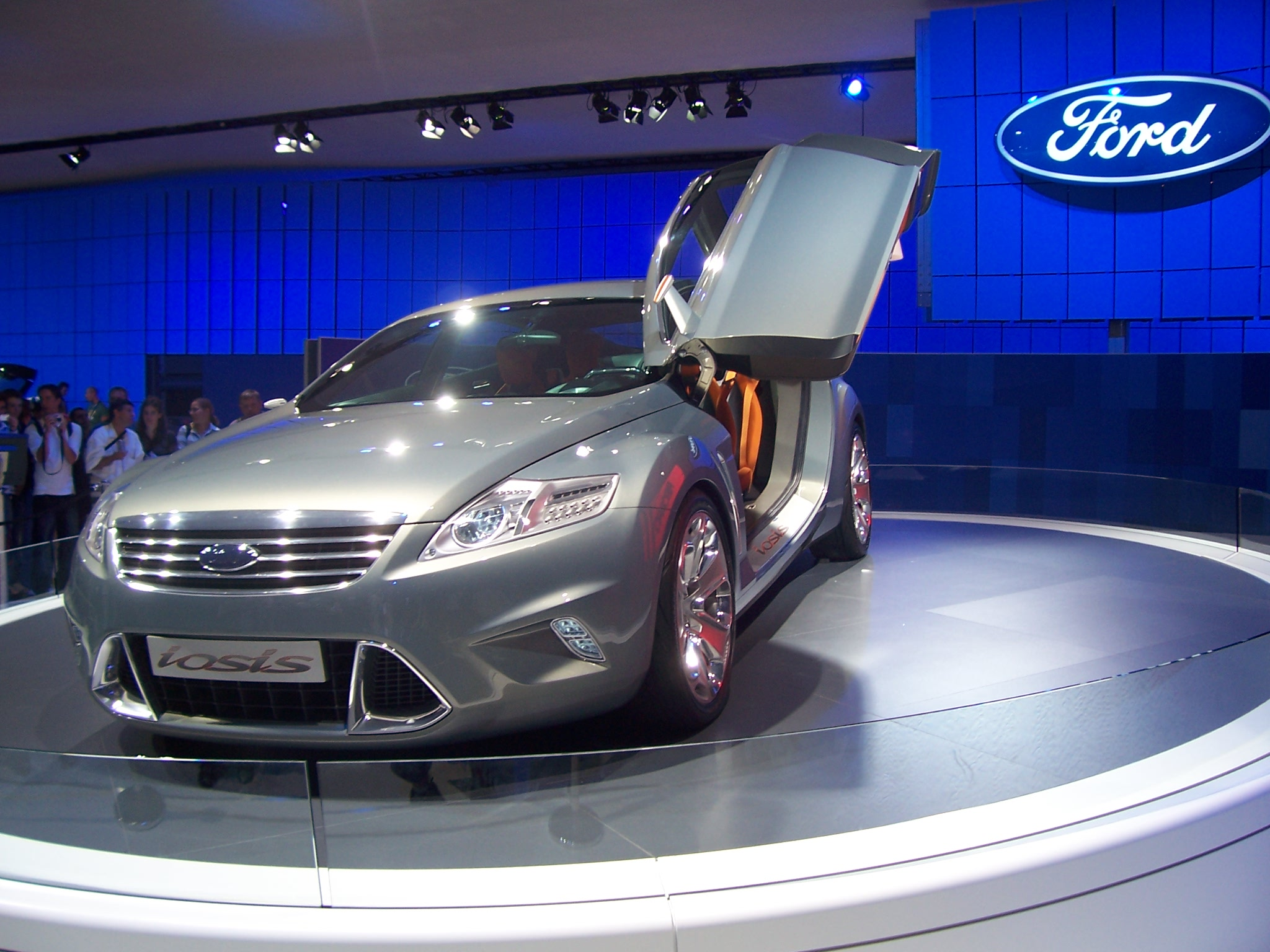
Ford Iosis concept

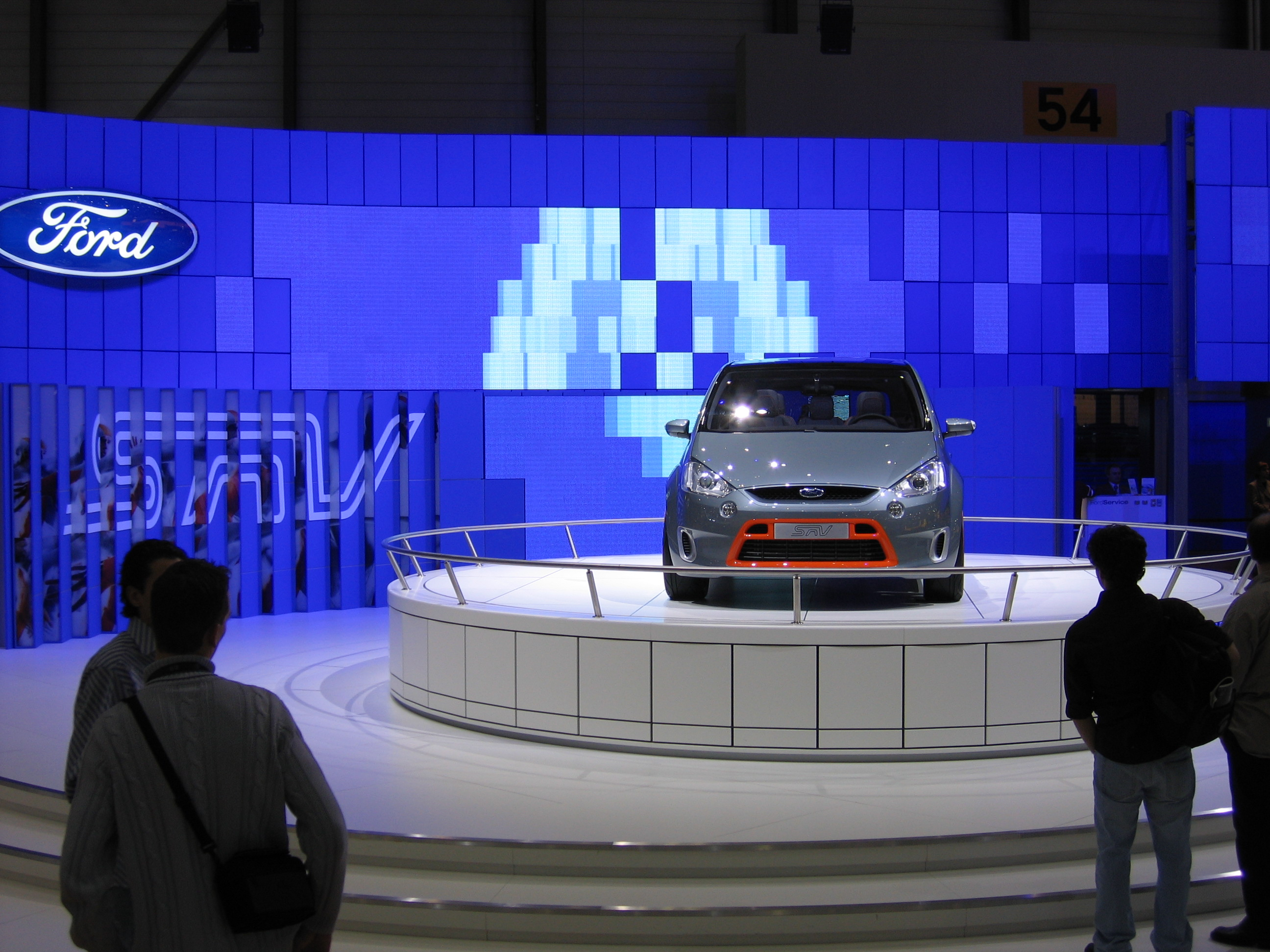
Ford SAV concept

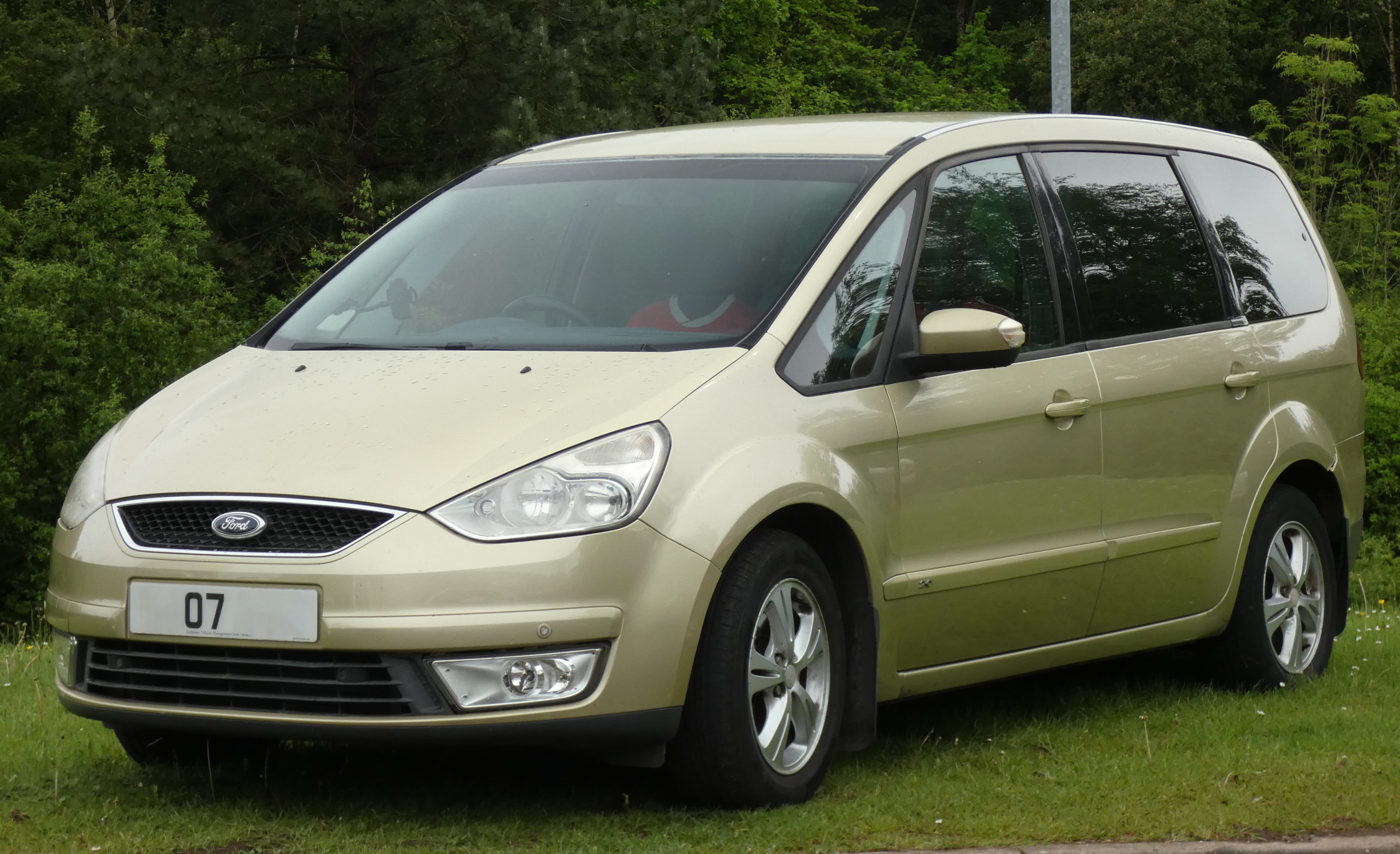
2006 Ford Galaxy

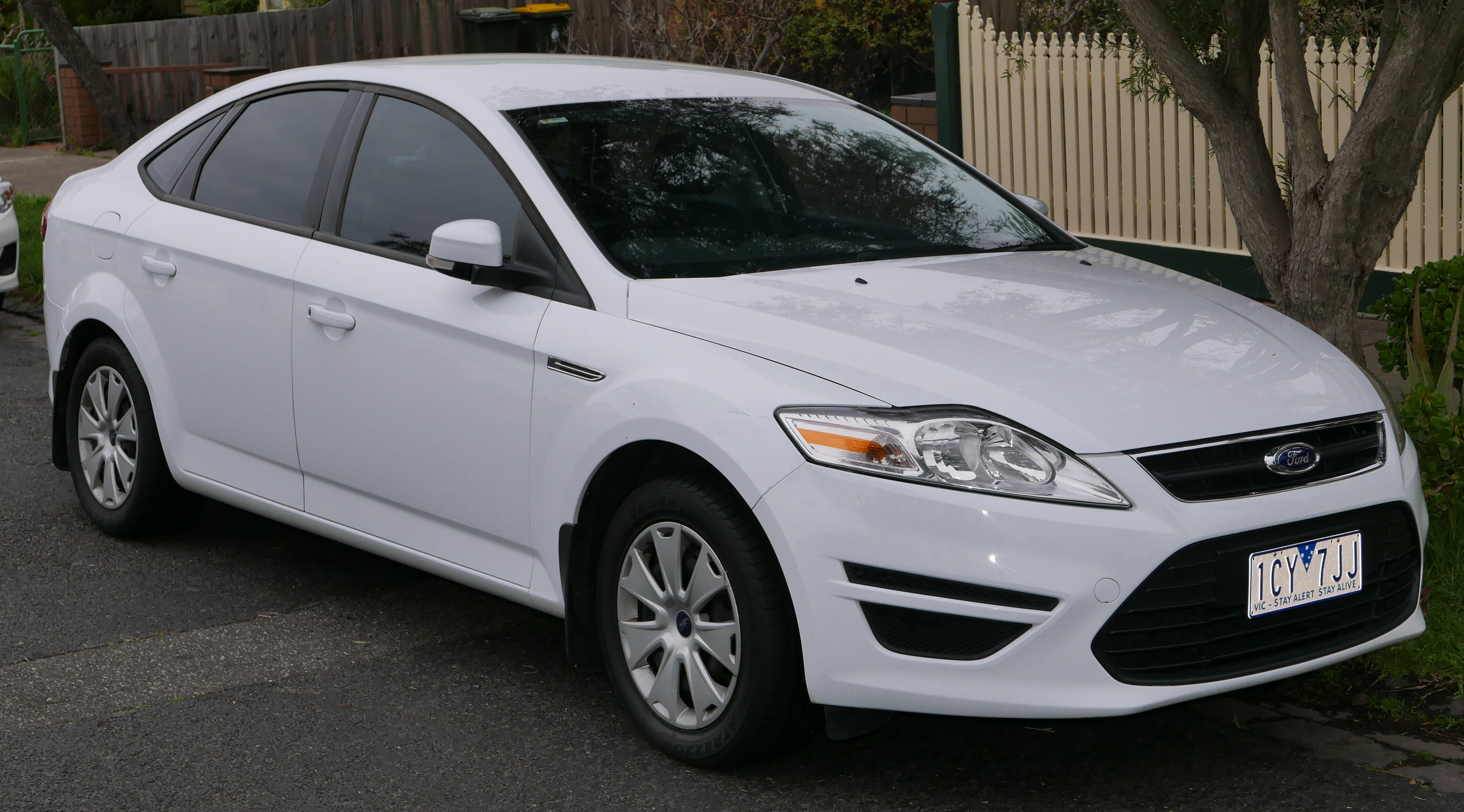
The Ford Mondeo features Kinetic styling

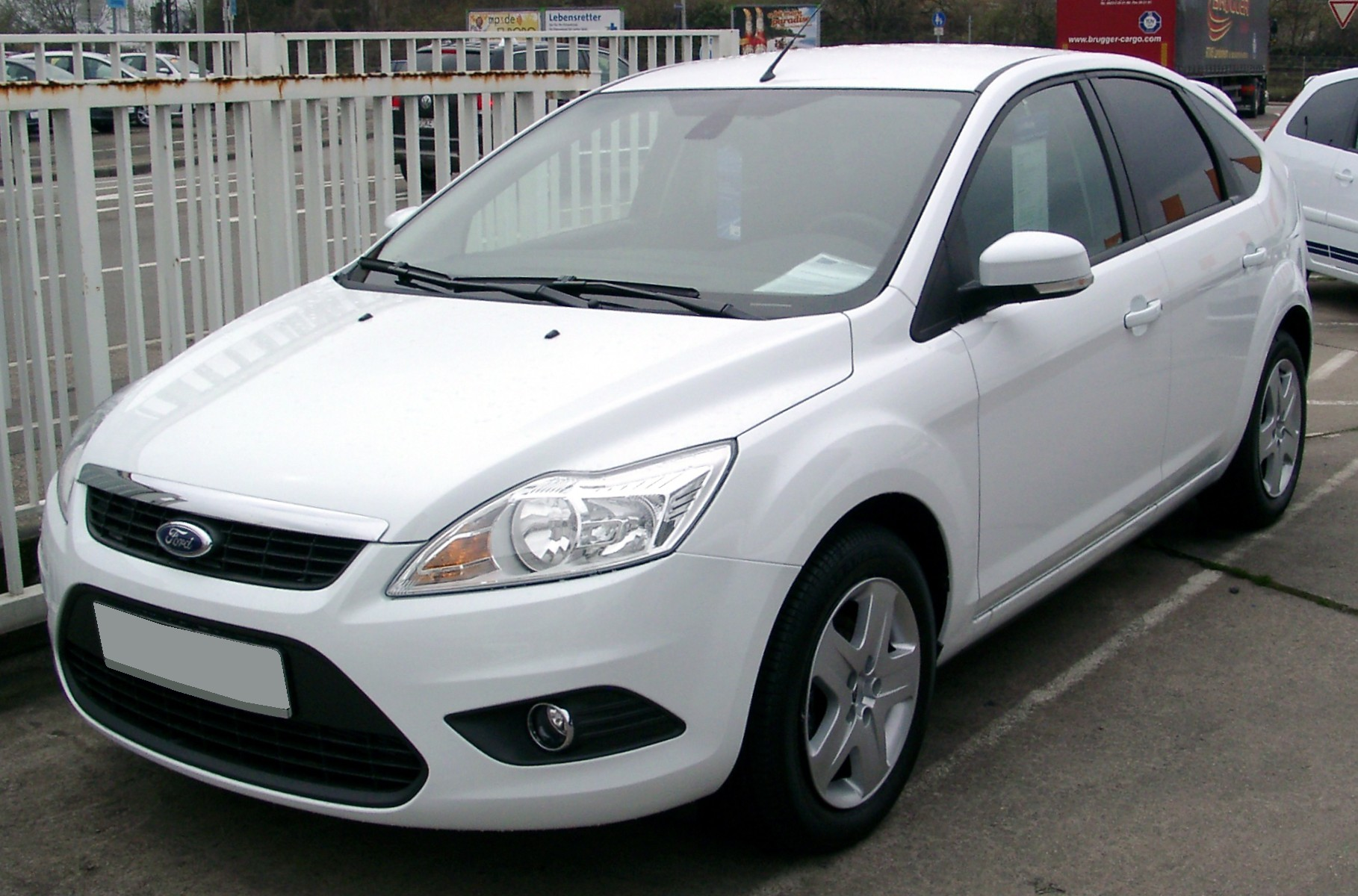
The second generation Ford Focus features Kinetic styling

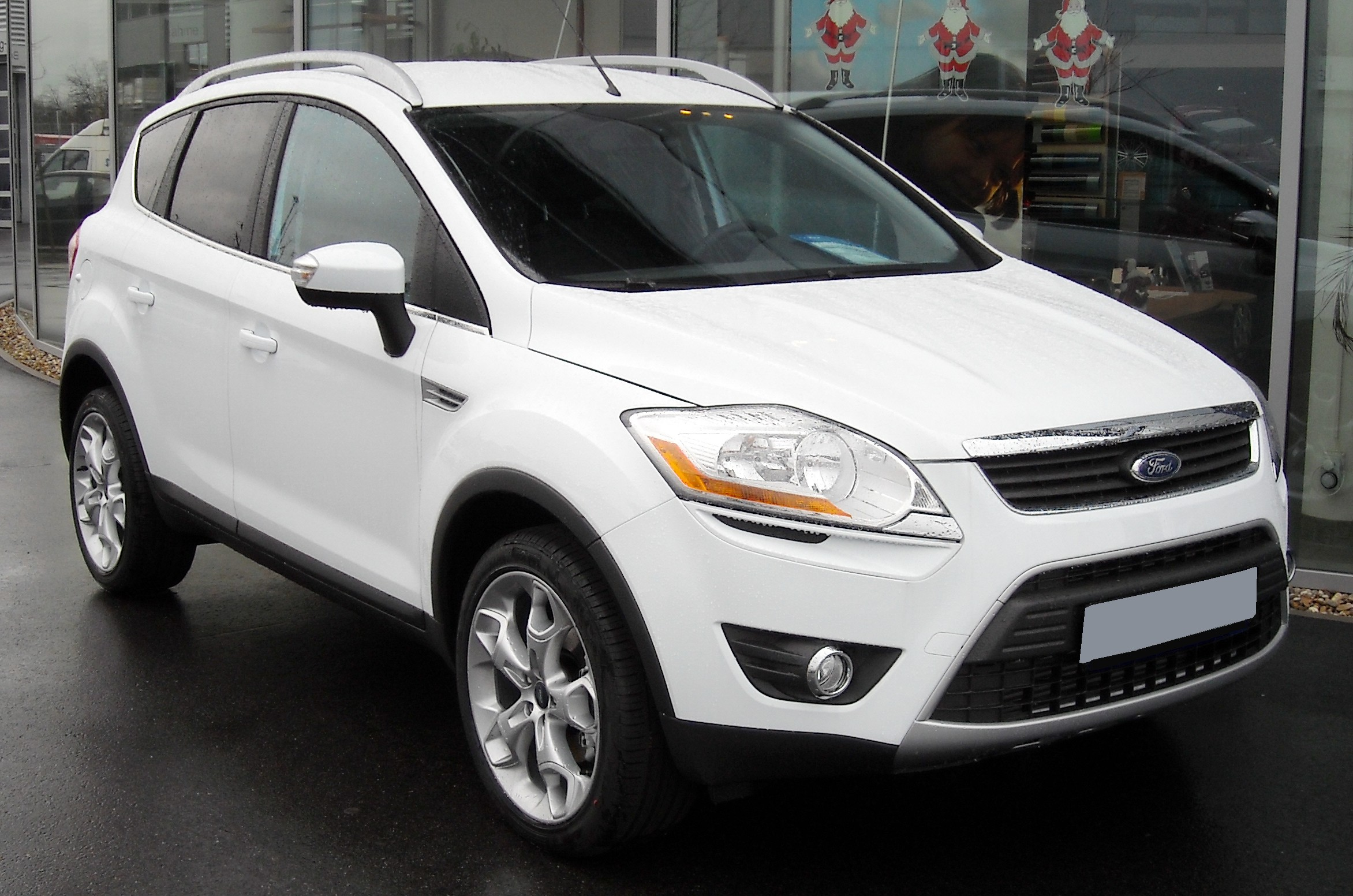
2008 Ford Kuga

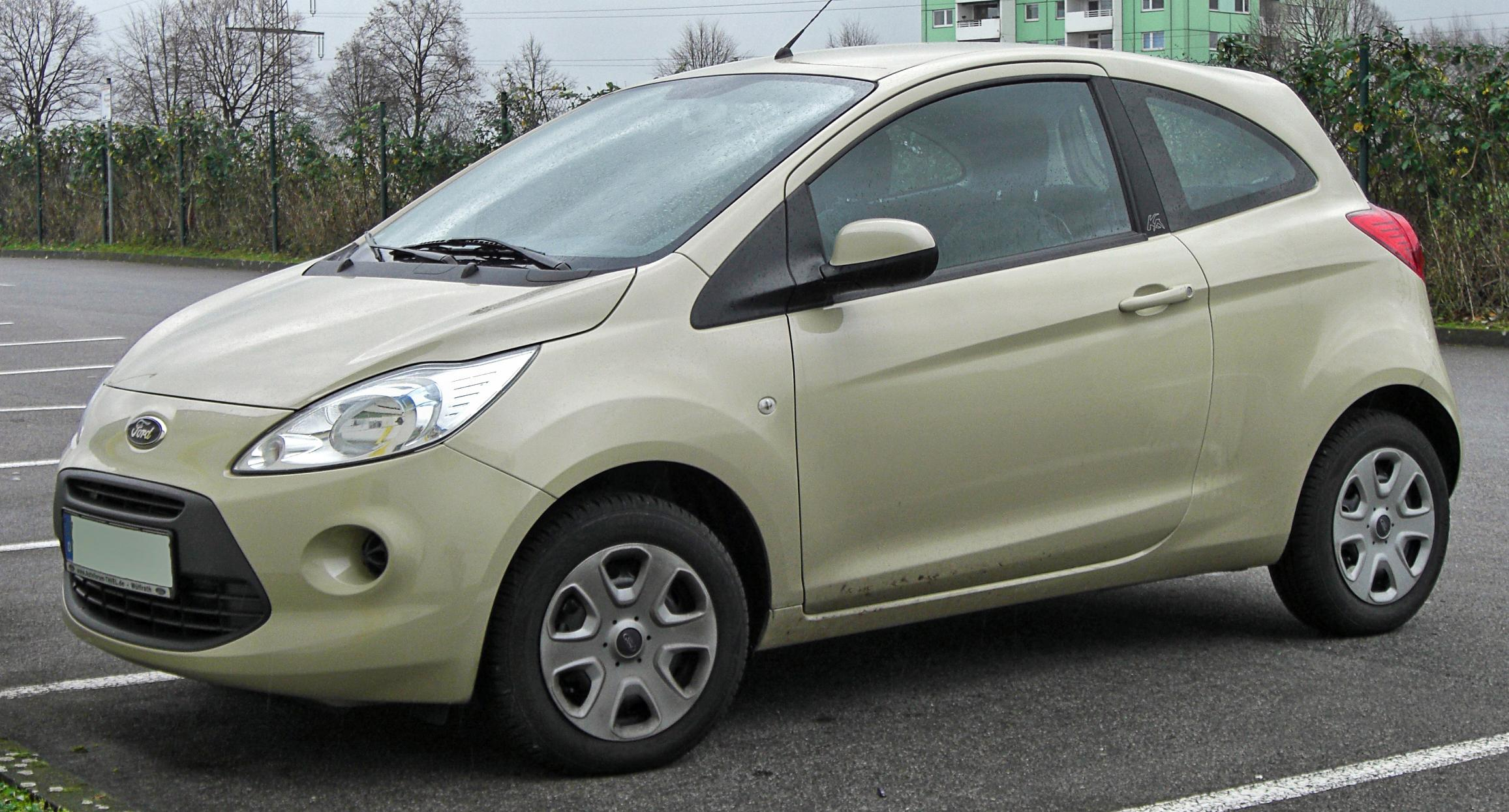
2008 Ford Ka

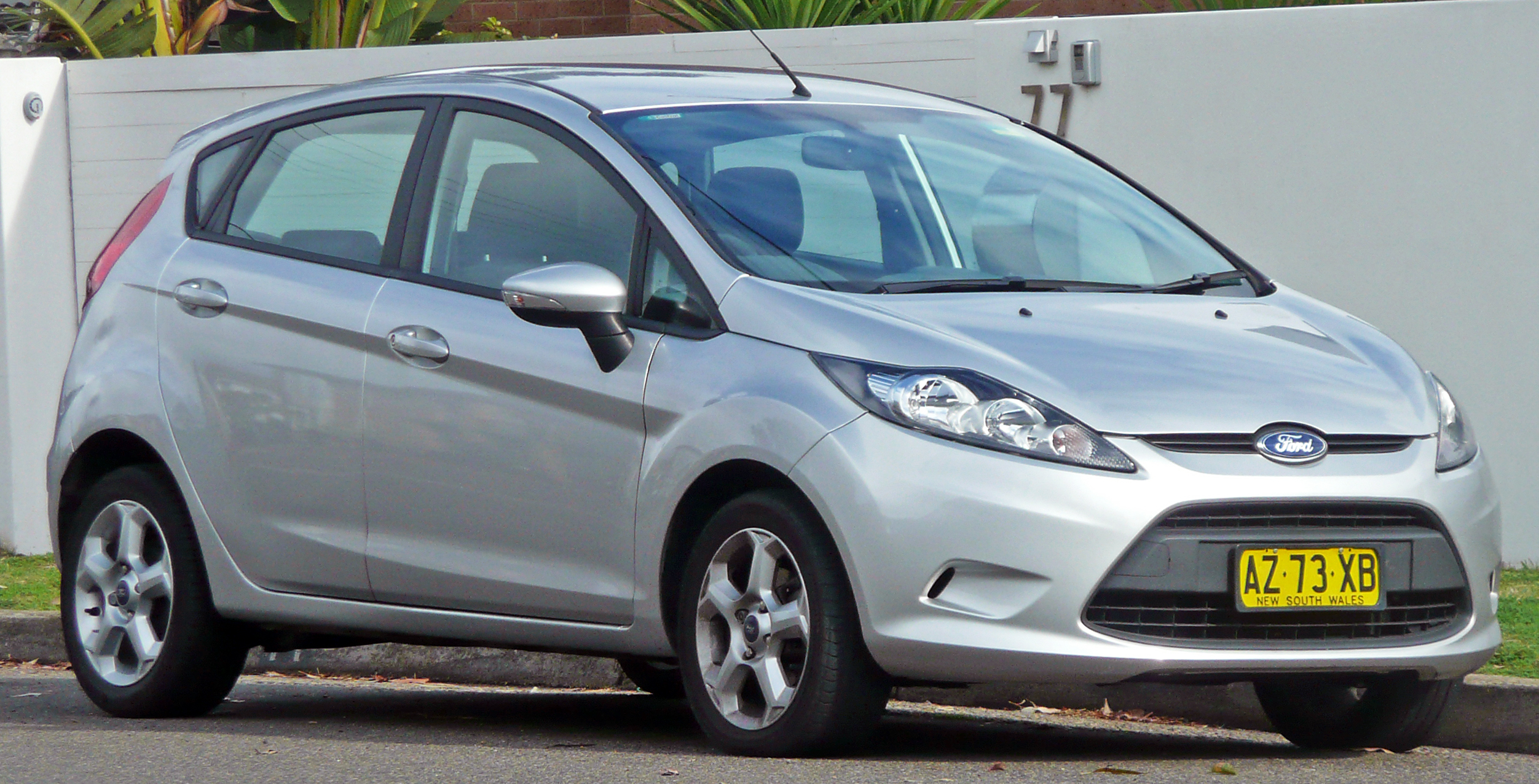
2008 Ford Fiesta

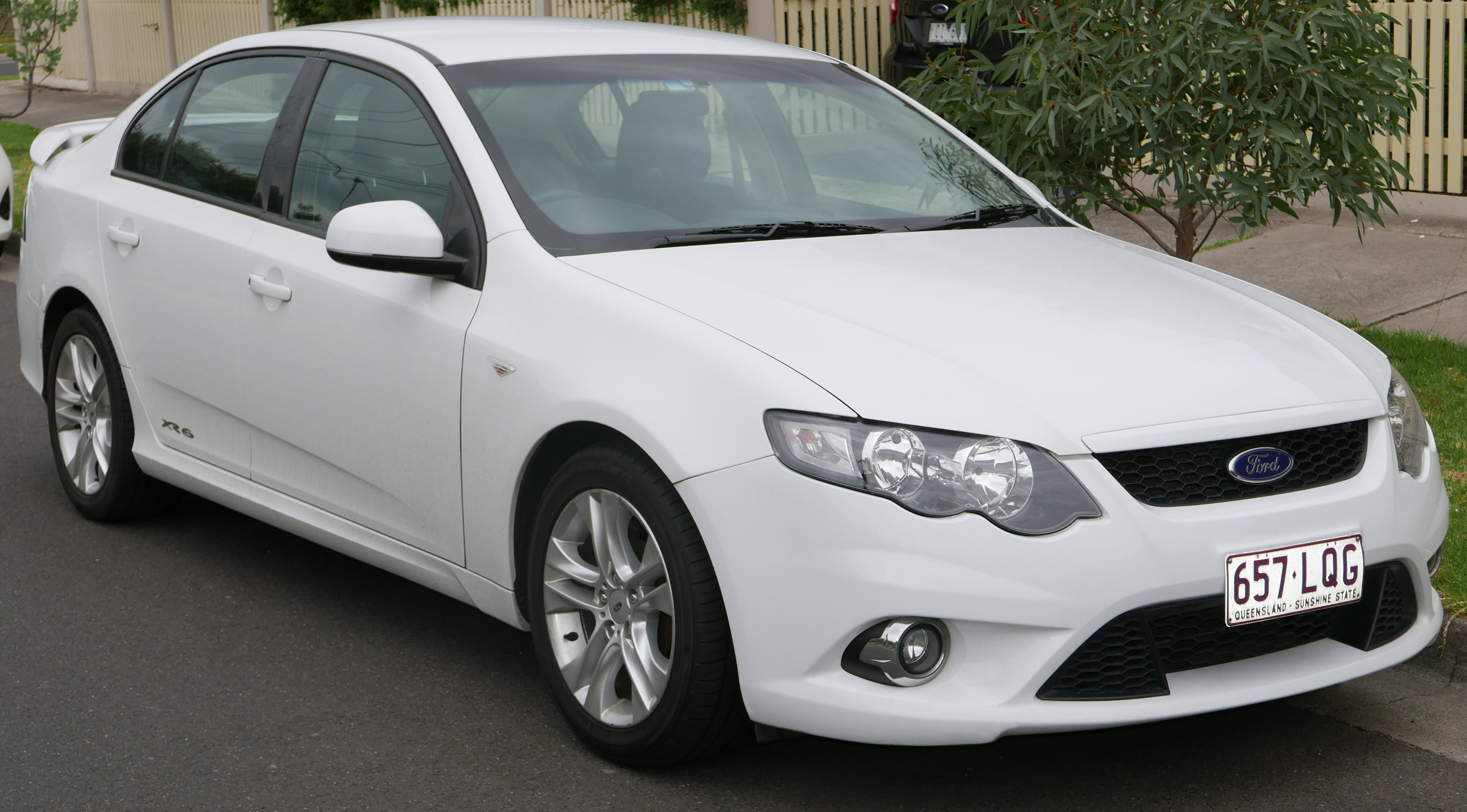
The Australian Ford Falcon incorporates Kinetic design, borrowing heavily from the Mondeo

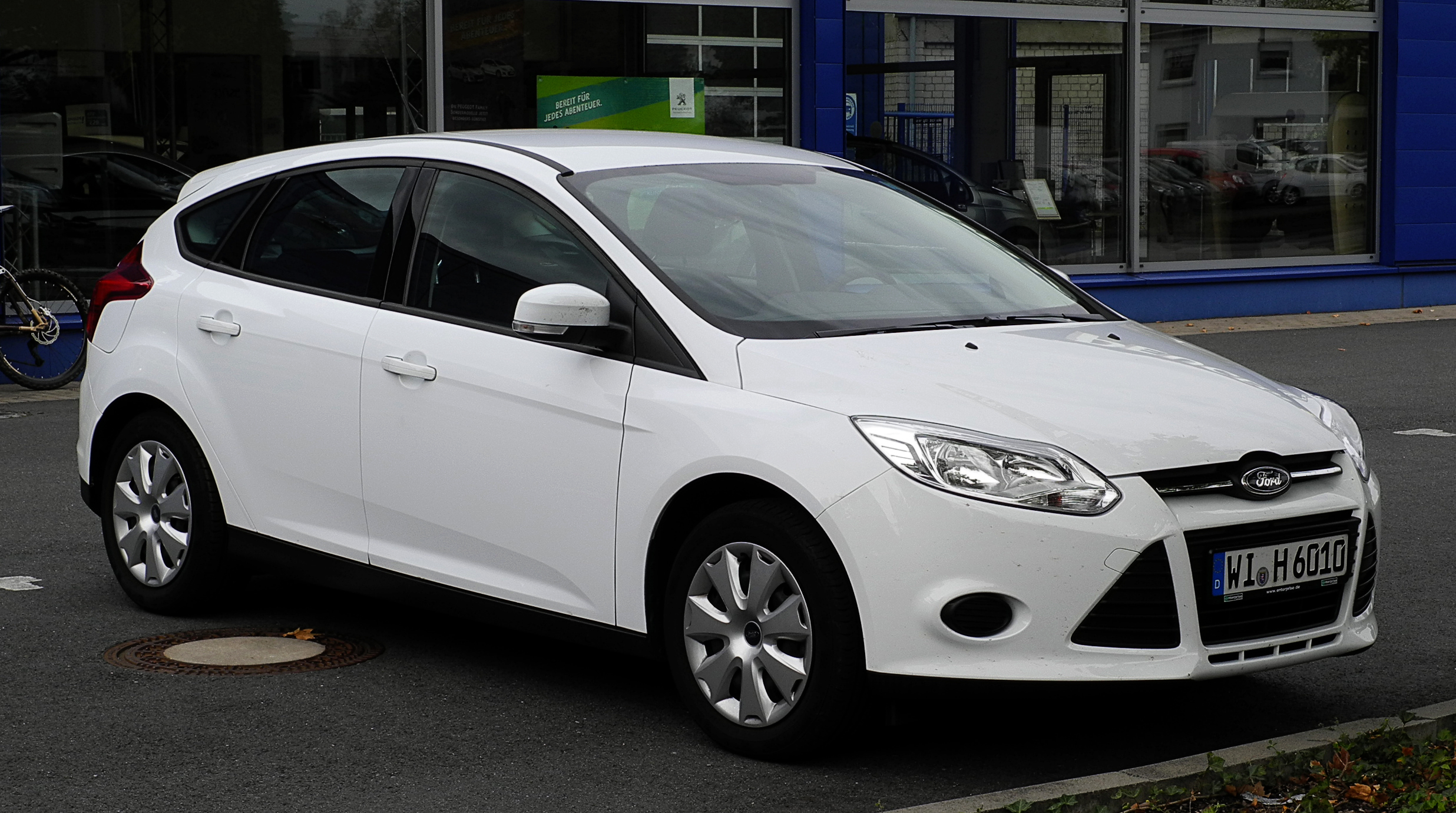
The third generation Ford Focus features Kinetic Styling

== Kinetic Design 2.0 ==
The Kinetic Design 2.0 design language was introduced in 2012 when the Ford Fiesta was facelifted. It was previewed with the Ford Evos concept.

The large trapezoidal grille resembles Aston Martin models.

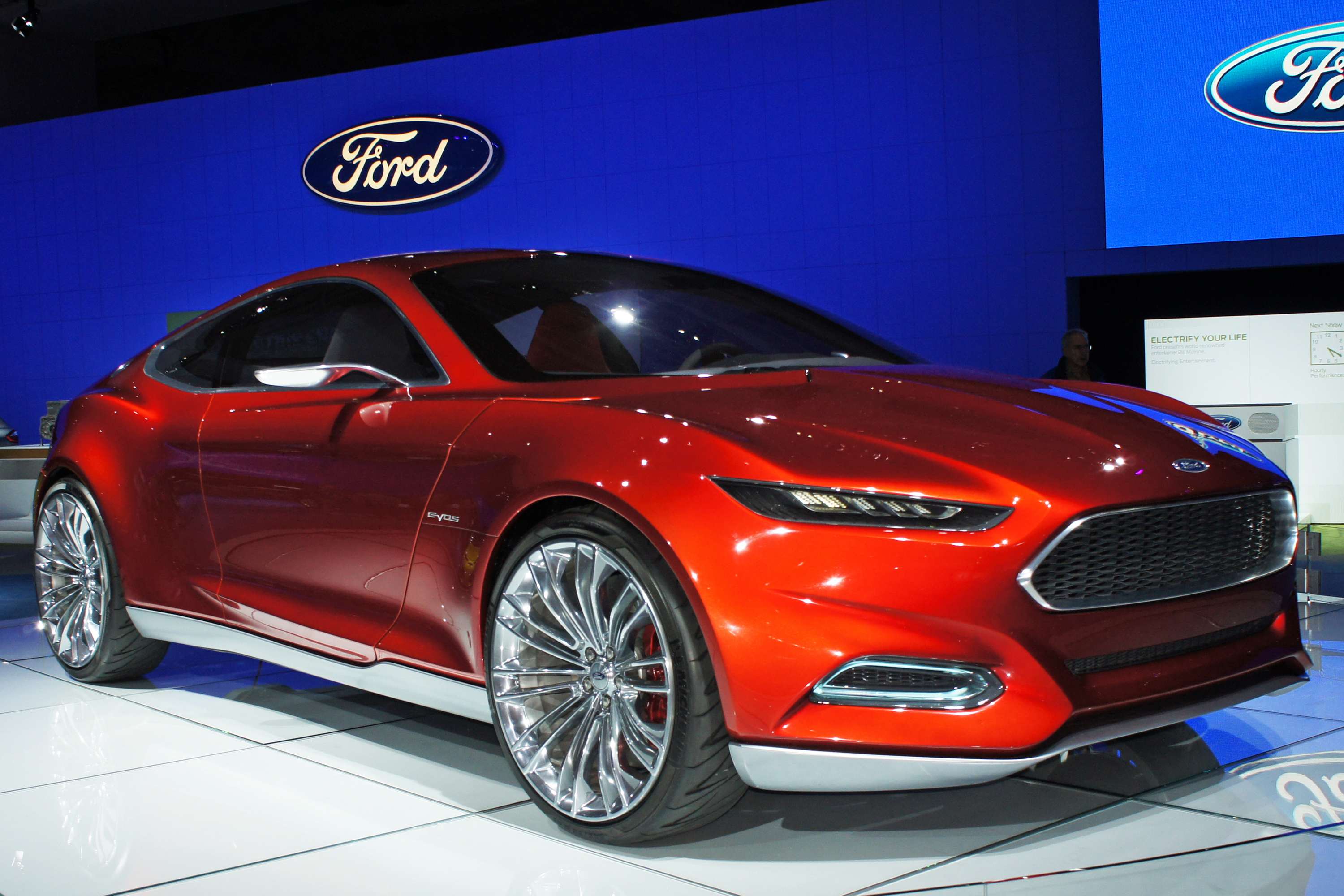
Ford Evos concept

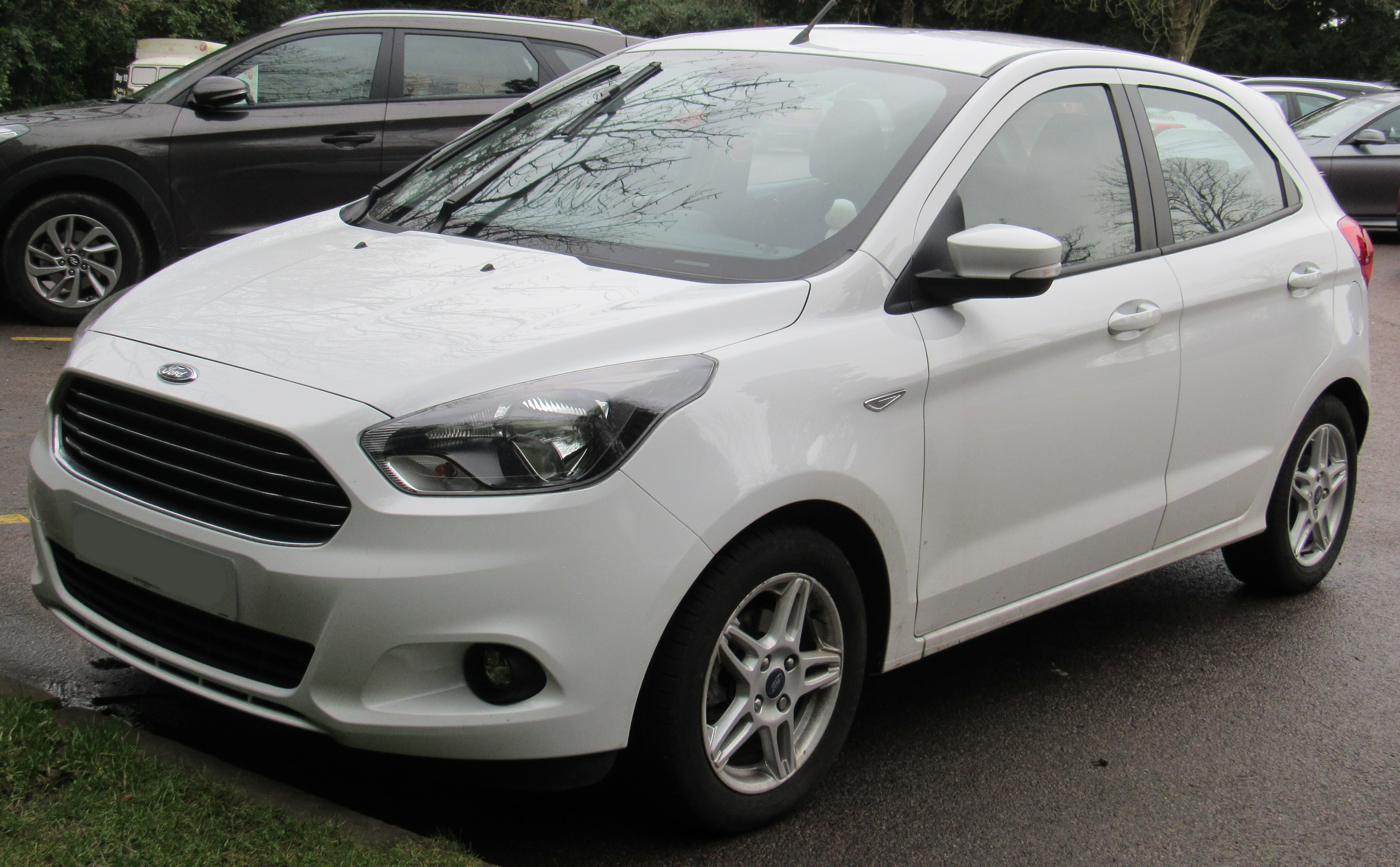
2017 Ford Ka+

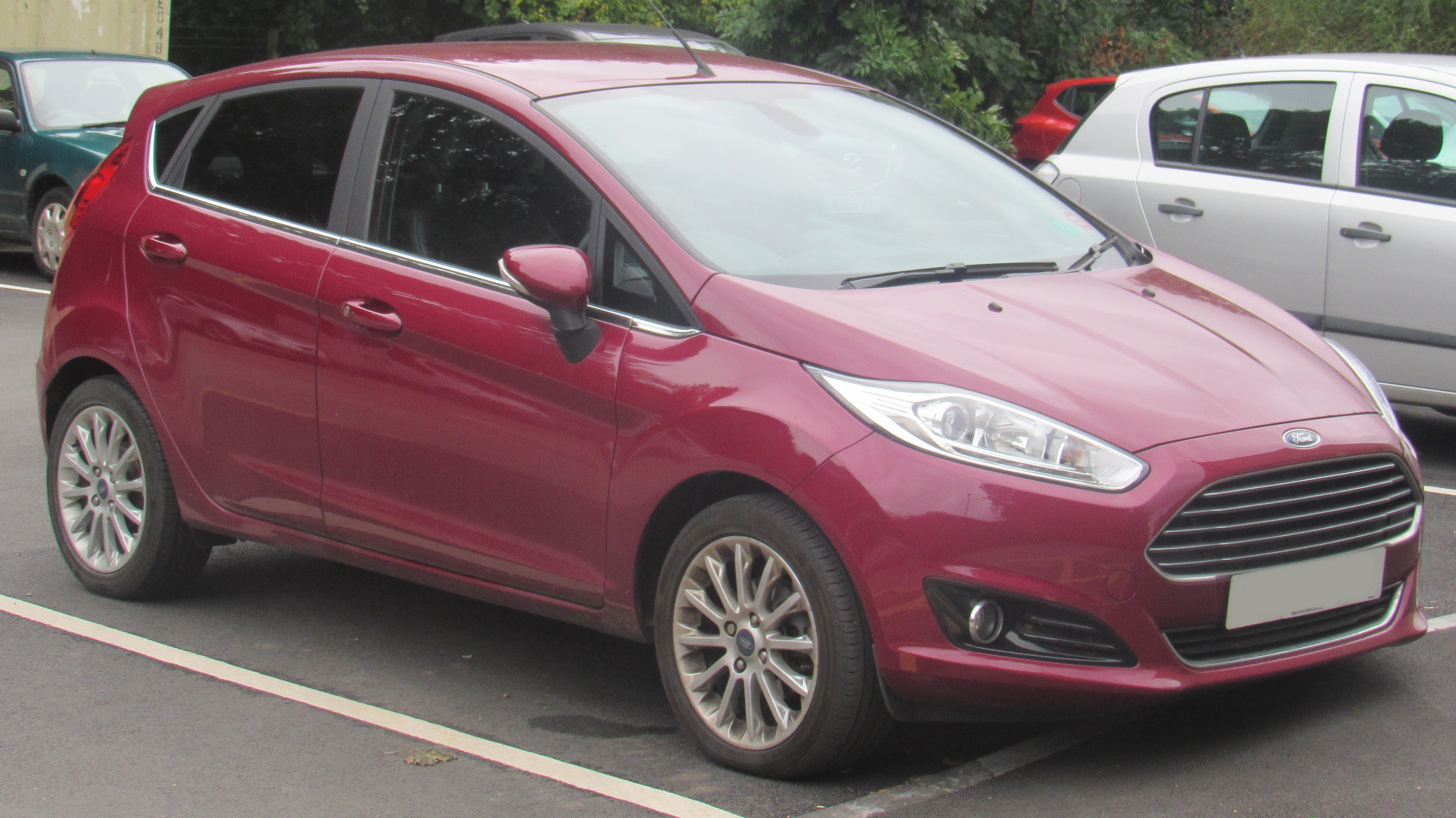
2013 Ford Fiesta

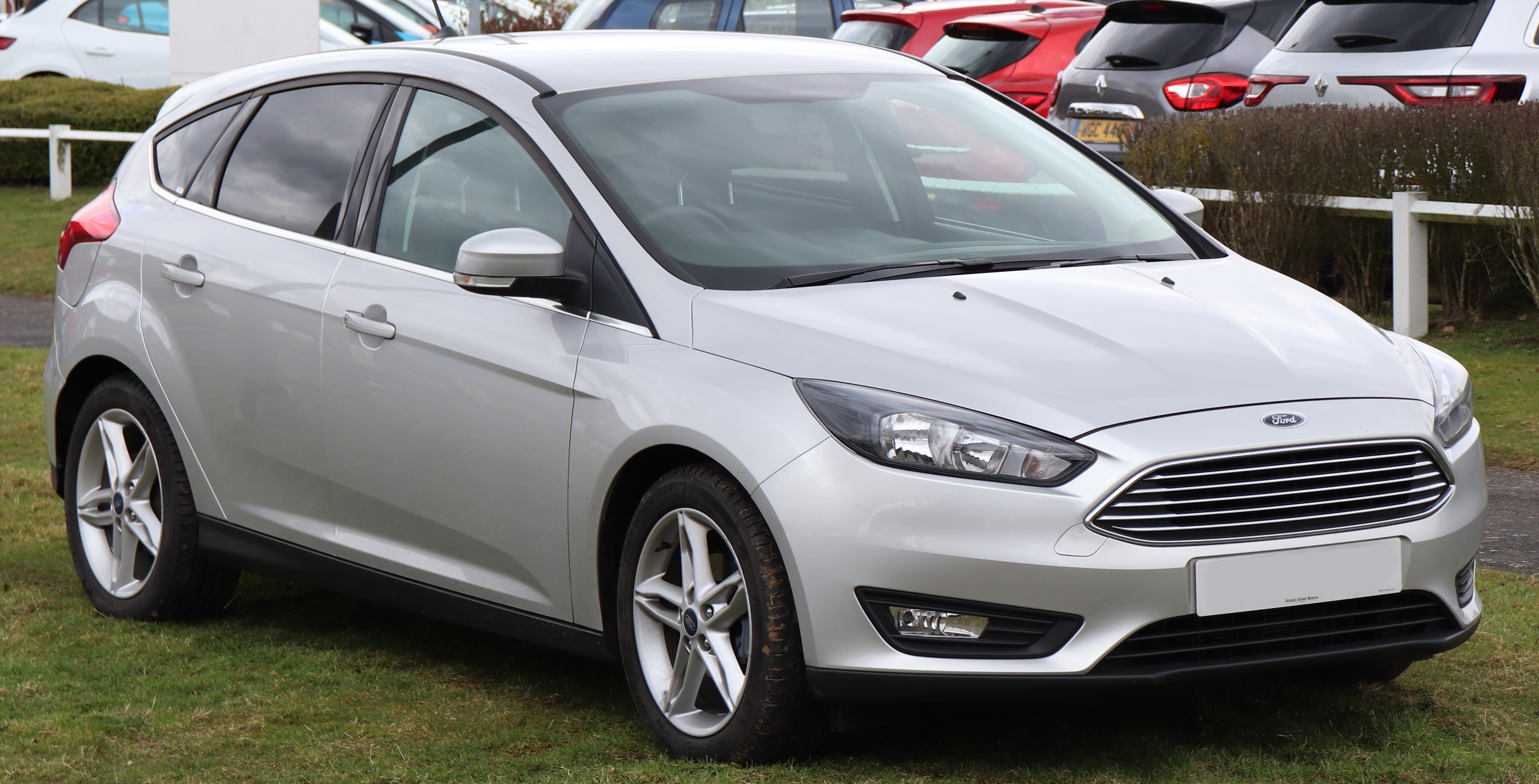
2015 Ford Focus

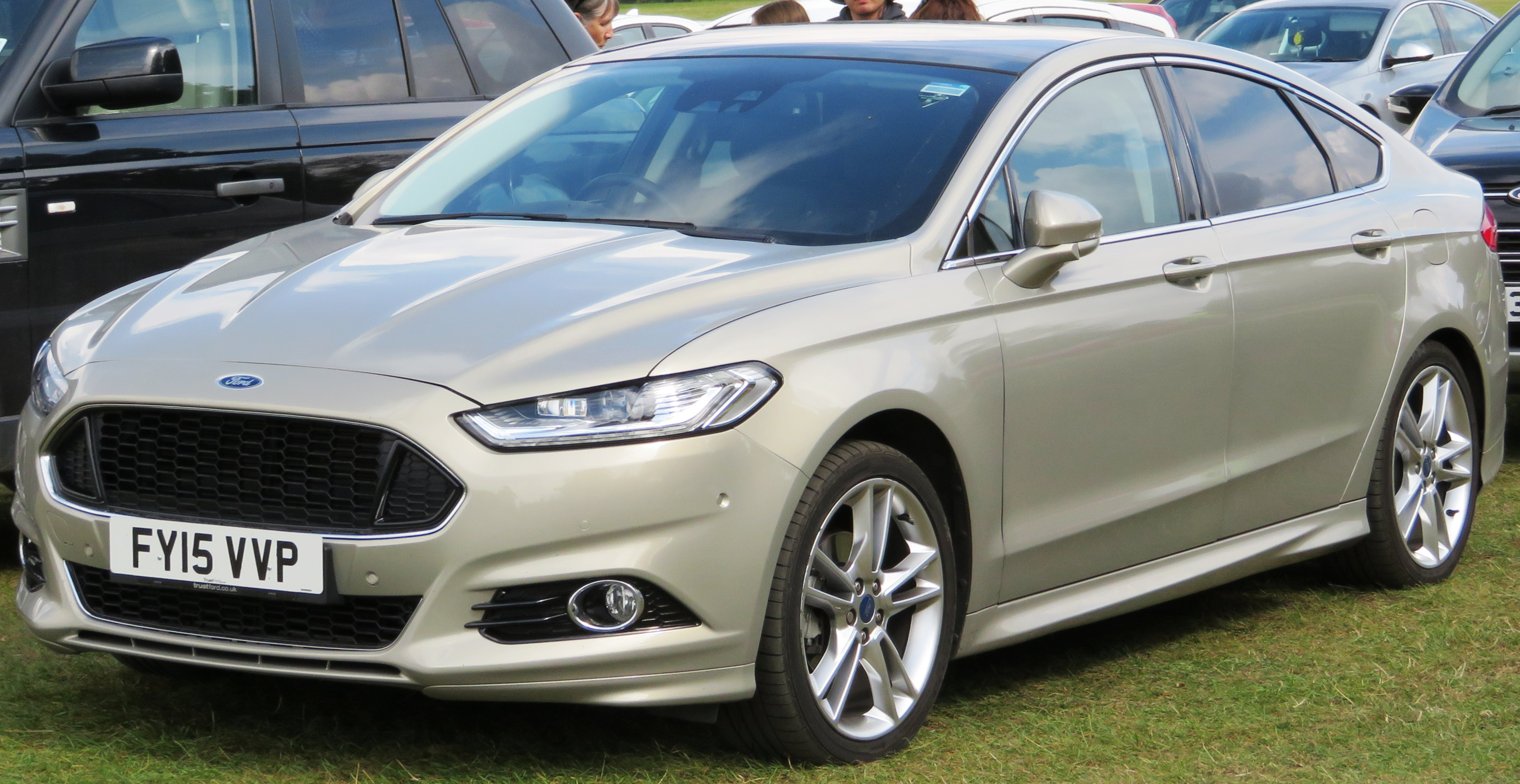
2014 Ford Mondeo

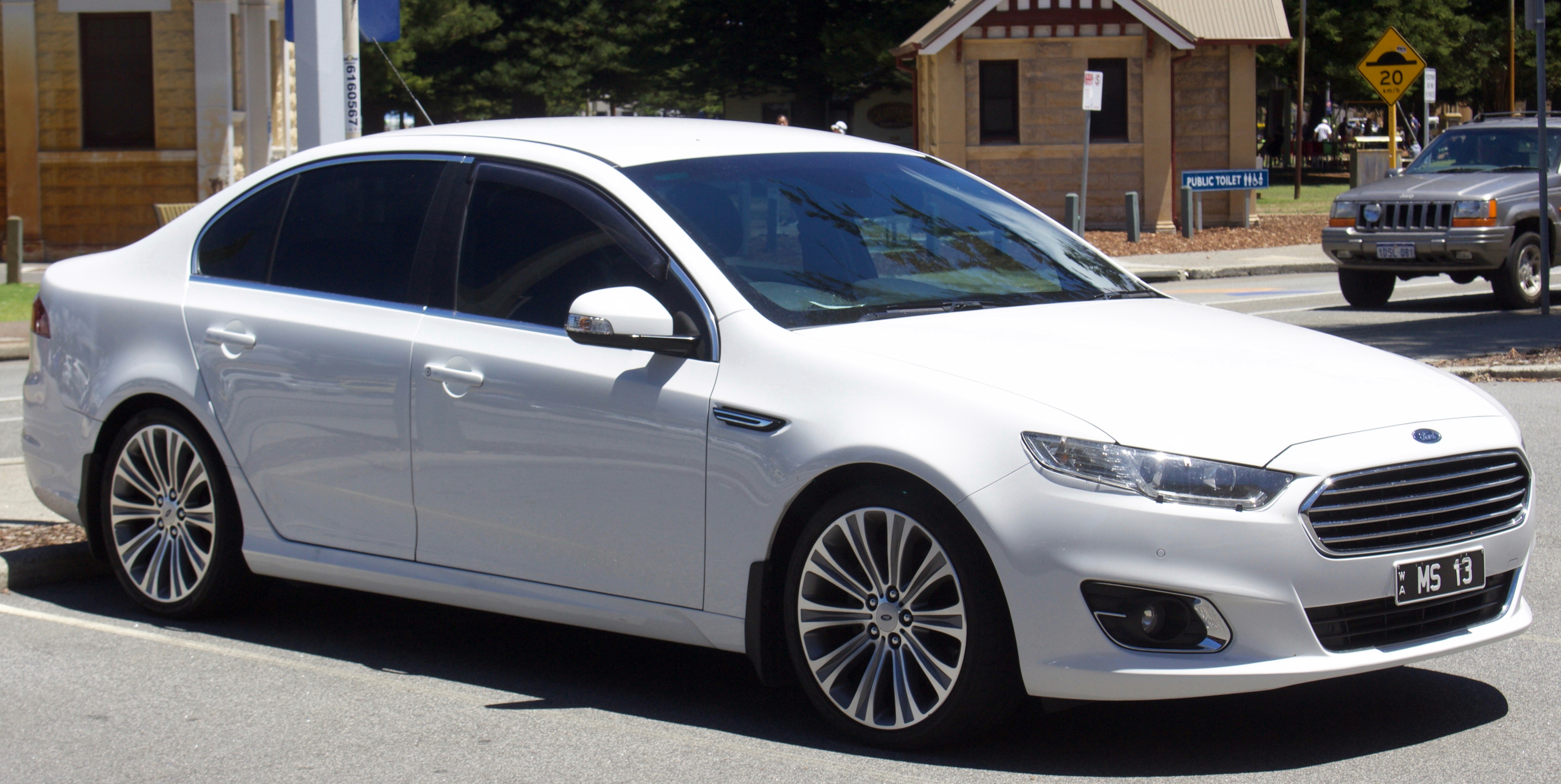
2015 Ford Falcon (FG X) incorporates Kinetic Design, borrowing heavily again from the Mondeo

https://www.slashgear.com/1469170/ford-kinetic-design-explained/
