= Ford Evos (concept car) =

American hybrid sports car concept

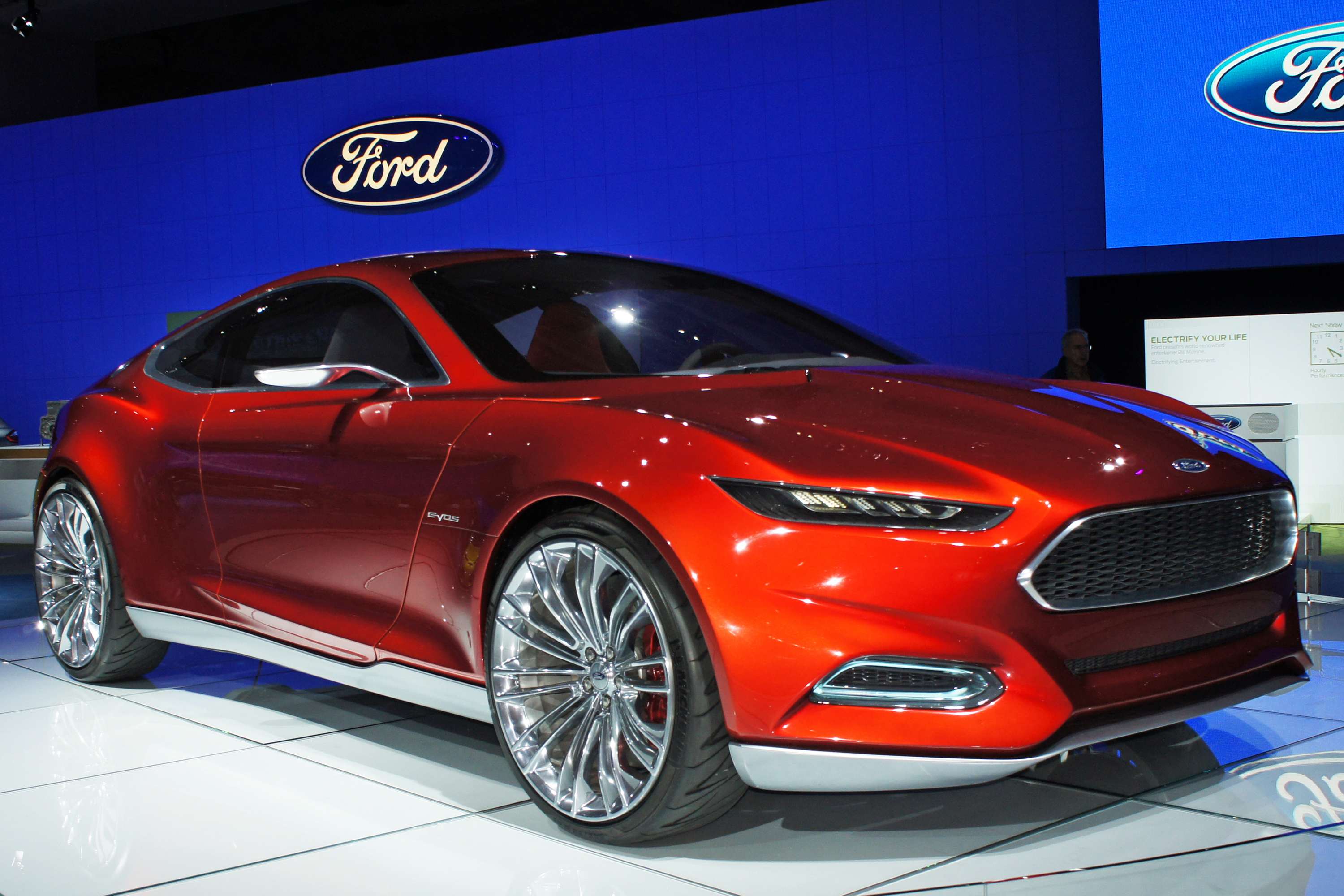

Overview
- Manufacturer: Ford
- Production: 2011 (Concept car)
- Designer: Stefan Lamm, Martin Smith, Eugen Enns

Body and chassis
- Class: Grand tourer (S)
- Body style: 4-door coupe
- Layout: RR layout
- Doors: Quad Butterflies; Butterfly doors (front); Suicide butterfly doors (rear)
- Related: Lincoln MKR

Powertrain
- Engine: 2.0L Duratec 20 Atkinson cycle Hybrid I4
- Electric motor: Permanent-magnet synchronous AC electric motor
- Transmission: Ford HF35 eCVT
- Hybrid drivetrain: PHEV
- Battery: 7.6 kWh lithium-ion

Dimensions
- Length: 4.5m
- Width: 1.97m
- Height: 1.36m

The Ford Evos is a coupe-style plug-in hybrid grand tourer concept car unveiled to the public at the September 2011 Frankfurt Motor Show by Ford Europe.

The exterior design, referred to as Kinetic 2.0, was carried out by Stefan Lamm under the leadership of Ford of Europe's executive design director Martin Smith. The car features four gull-wing doors and is not intended for production. However, Ford announced that the design strategy showcased in the Evos will appear on production cars in a few months.

The Evos is powered by a plug-in hybrid electric powertrain which consists of a 2.0-liter Atkinson cycle gasoline engine, electric motor and lithium-ion battery pack.

== Overview ==
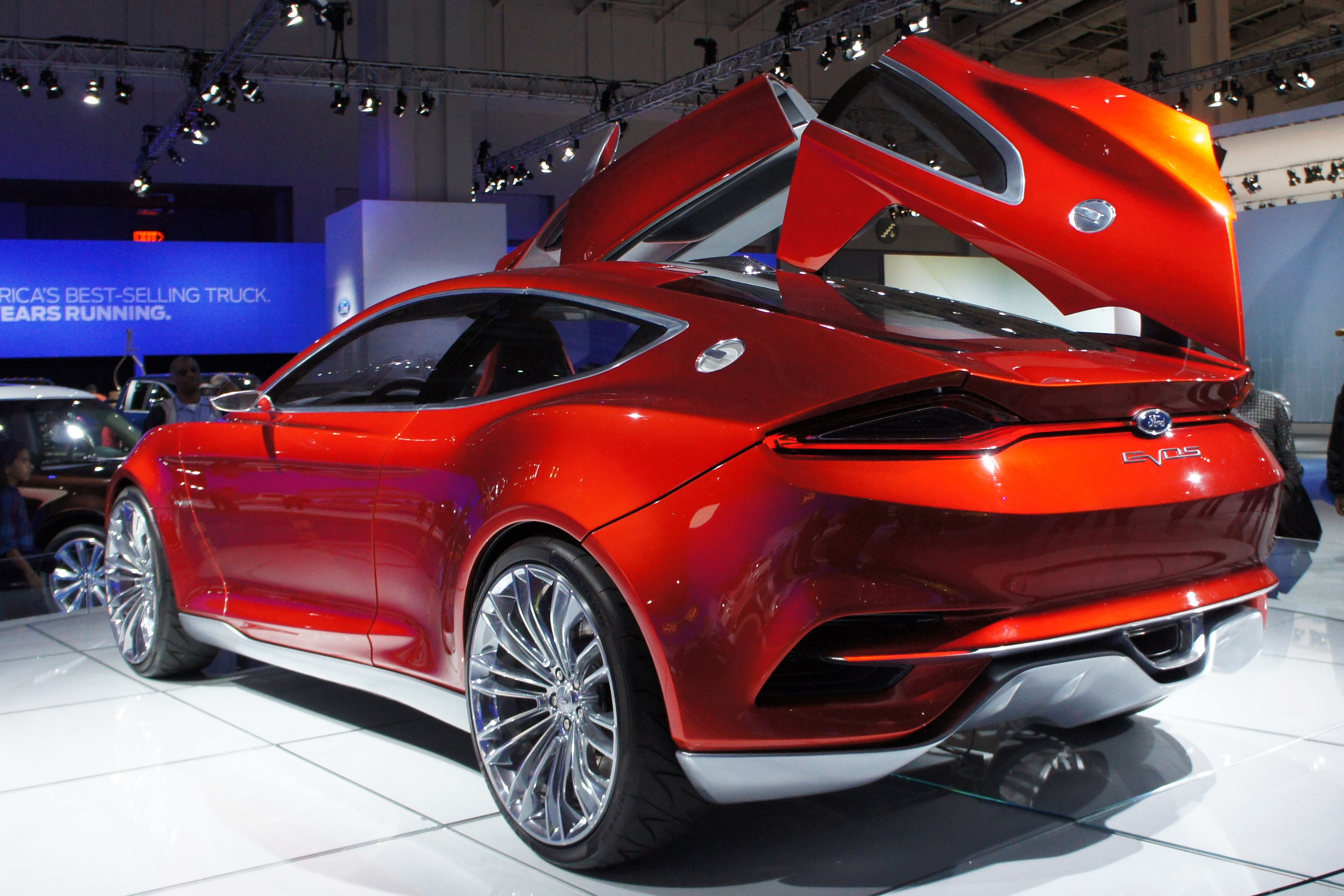
Ford Evos rear

The Evos is a four-door, four-seat coupé that was designed by Stefan Lamm, Martin Smith and Eugen Enns as a further development from "Kinetic Design". Like the previous Ford Iosis study, the vehicle has gull-wing doors hinged in opposite directions and no B-pillar. The plug-in hybrid is driven either by a gasoline or an electric motor, and the energy is stored in a lithium-ion battery developed by Ford. The drive is not a study, it was taken over from the Ford C-Max Energi, which went into series production in 2013. The gasoline engine is only used when the maximum speed of 75 km/h (47 mph) for electric operation is exceeded or the stored electricity for the electric motor is running out. The total range of the drive concept is over 800 km (500 mi).

The full-LED headlights, which was to be available in Ford series vehicles in the future, are kept very flat and thus appear slit-shaped, the grille is trapezoidal and not drawn down as far as on the current Ford models. Wide-flared wheel arches give the vehicle a very sporty impression. At the rear of the car there is a continuous strip of taillights, including a centrally arranged, likewise trapezoidal exhaust and a large, silver-colored diffuser.

There are four bucket seats in the interior and the fittings are completely digital. At higher speeds, less important information is automatically hidden to reduce the risk of distraction. The playlist of the audio system, as well as settings for the air conditioning, seat position and even the desired coordination of steering, chassis and transmission should be set fully automatically to the driver via cloud access. The electronics use the seats to determine the driver's pulse rate while driving and adapt the car to its physical condition; special filter systems also protect the occupants from unclean air.

== See also ==
- Ford C-Max Energi
- Ford Focus Electric
- List of modern production plug-in electric vehicles
- Plug-in electric vehicle
