= Opel Trixx =

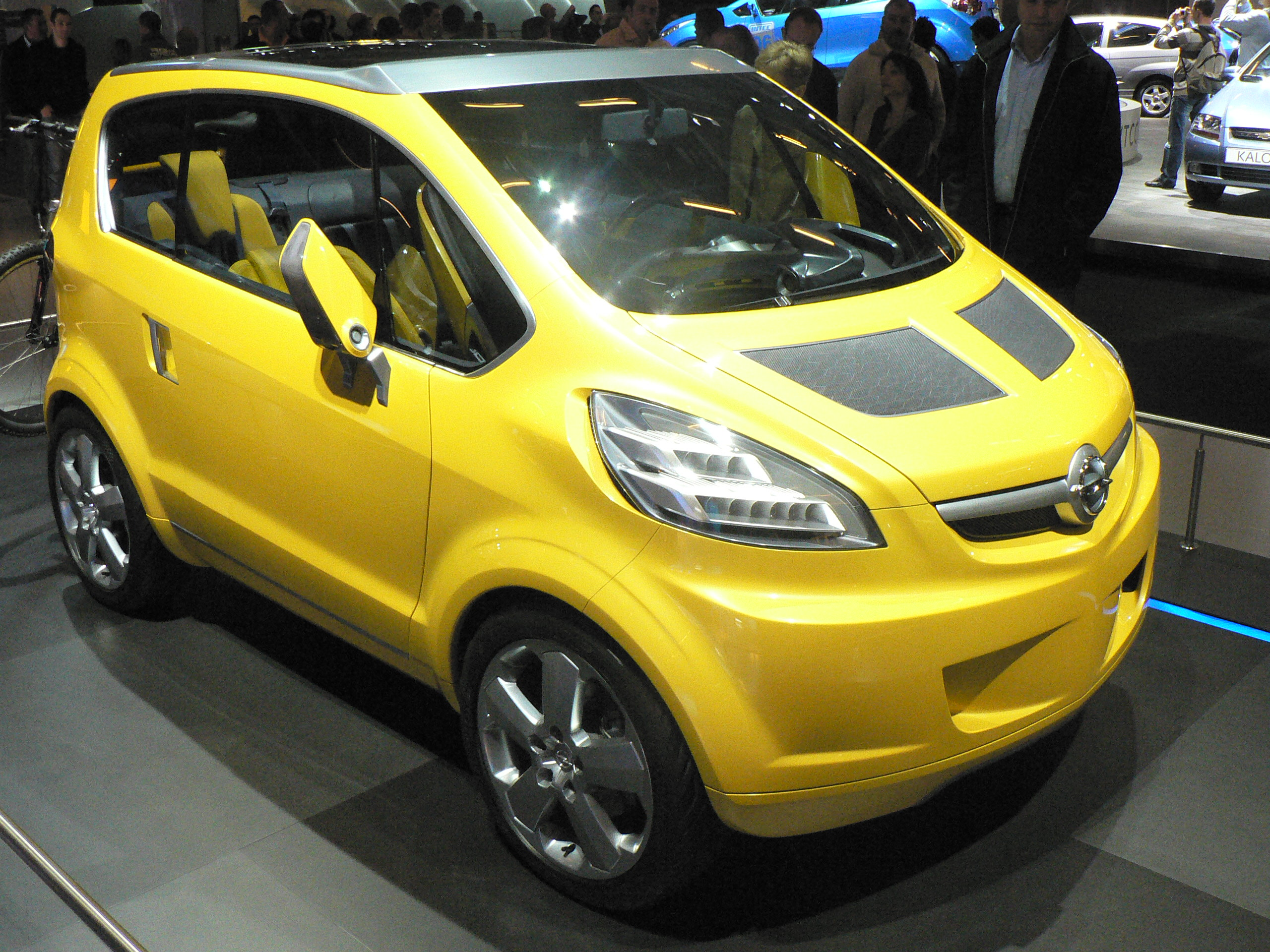

Overview
- Manufacturer: Opel
- Production: 2004 (Concept car)
- Designer: Stefan Arndt; Martin Smith

Body and chassis
- Class: City car (A)
- Body style: 5-door hatchback
- Layout: Front engine, front-wheel drive
- Related: Opel Agila

Powertrain
- Engine: 1.3 L diesel I4

Dimensions
- Length: 3,000 mm (118.1 in)
- Height: 1,540 mm (60.6 in)

The Opel Trixx (stylised as TRIXX) is a concept city car created by German car manufacturer Opel. It was unveiled at the 2004 Geneva Motor Show.

The brief was set out by Opel CEO Carl-Peter Forster to the Opel and Saab design studios, and was led by executive director of design Martin Smith and chief designer Stefan Arndt. The car was built at Carrozzeria Coggiola in Italy. This concept influenced future small-car designs for Opel, such as the 2007 Opel Agila.

The three-metre long car features an asymmetrical door layout, with sliding doors and a sliding roof hatch for large cargo. A cycle rack is concealed in the pull-out rear bumper feature. The Trixx is powered by a 1.3-litre diesel engine with common rail direct injection. This gives the car a claimed top speed of 70 mph (112.6 km/h). The Trixx featured the Flex 3 layout. This offers seating for three adults and one child on a folding seat, or a single-seater format with a large, 1,010-litre luggage area. The rear passenger seat is inflatable to save space when not in use; it is inflated by pulling up the head restraint.

It was anticipated that an electric concept car based on the Ampera and the Trixx would follow in 2009, but this was not forthcoming.
