= Opel Speedster =

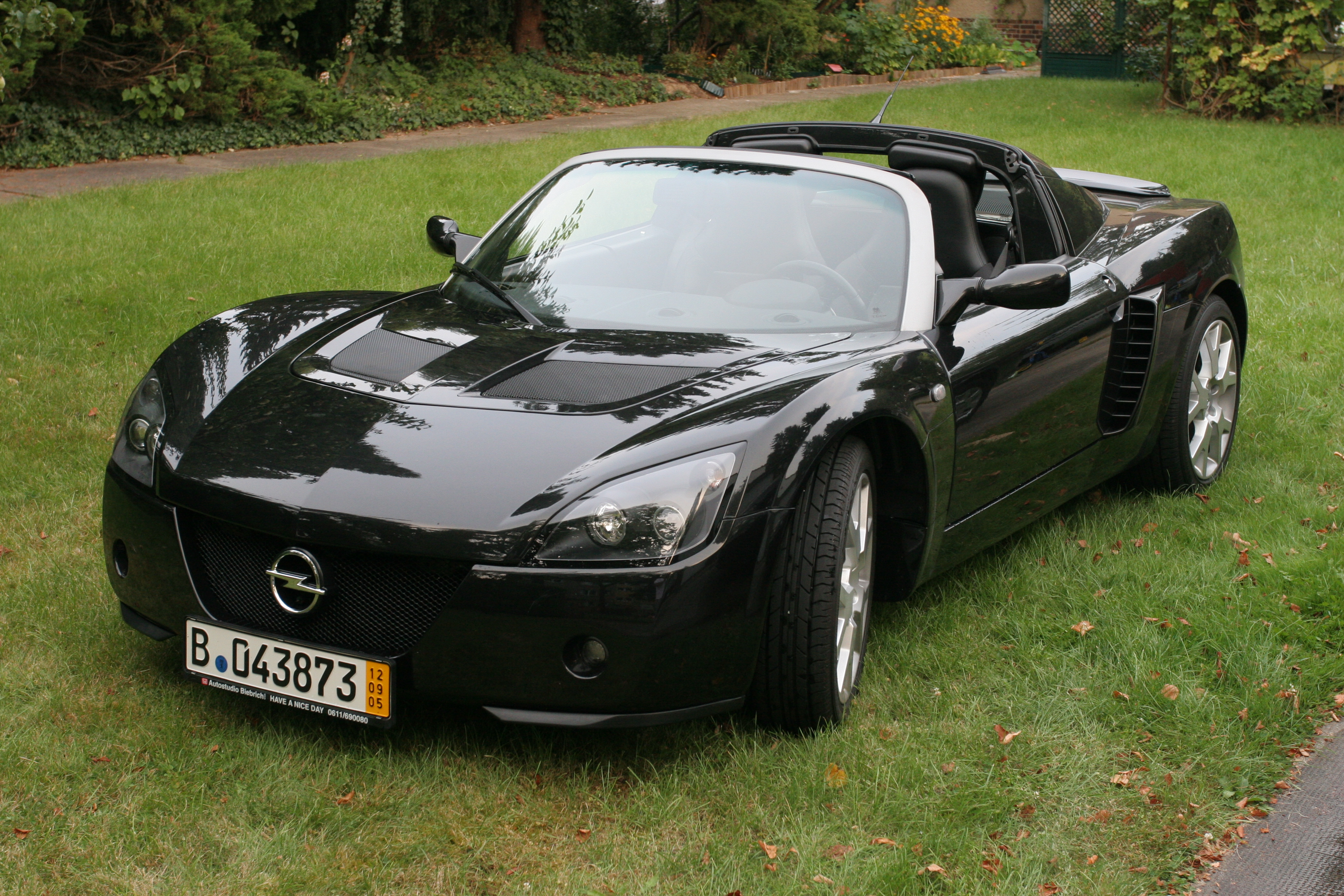

Overview
- Manufacturer: Opel/Vauxhall (General Motors); Lotus
- Also called: Opel Speedster Turbo (2004–2005); Vauxhall VX220 (United Kingdom); Vauxhall VX220 Turbo (2004–2005)
- Production: July 17, 2000 – July 22, 2005
- Assembly: United Kingdom: Hethel, Norfolk, England
- Designer: Niels Loeb and Martin Smith (exterior); Steven Crijns (interior)

Body and chassis
- Class: Sports car
- Body style: 2-door roadster
- Layout: Transverse mid-engine, rear-wheel drive
- Platform: Lotus Elise Series 2 platform
- Related: Lotus Elise

Powertrain
- Engine: 2.0 L Z20LET turbo I4; 2.2 L Ecotec Z22SE I4
- Transmission: 5-speed Getrag F23 manual

Dimensions
- Wheelbase: 91.7 in (2,329 mm)
- Length: 149.2 in (3,790 mm)
- Width: 67.2 in (1,707 mm); 57.1 in (1,450 mm) front track; 58.8 in (1,494 mm) rear track
- Height: 43.8 in (1,113 mm)
- Kerb weight: Speedster: 870 kg (1,918 lb); Speedster Turbo: 930 kg (2,050 lb)

Chronology
- Successor: Opel GT (Europe)

The Opel Speedster is a mid-engined, targa-topped, two-seat sports car produced by German automaker Opel from July 2000 to July 2005. It was built in both RHD and LHD versions at the Lotus Cars plant in Hethel, Norfolk, England. It was presented at the Geneva Motor Show in March 1999 and went into full production the following year.

It was sold by Vauxhall as the VX220 in the United Kingdom and shared much in common with the Lotus Elise, although Opel claimed few parts were interchangeable.

== Design and development ==
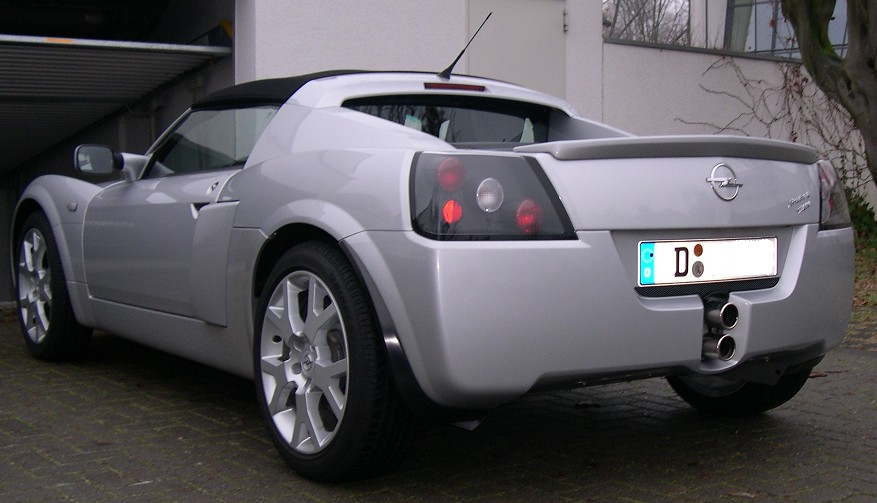
Rear view

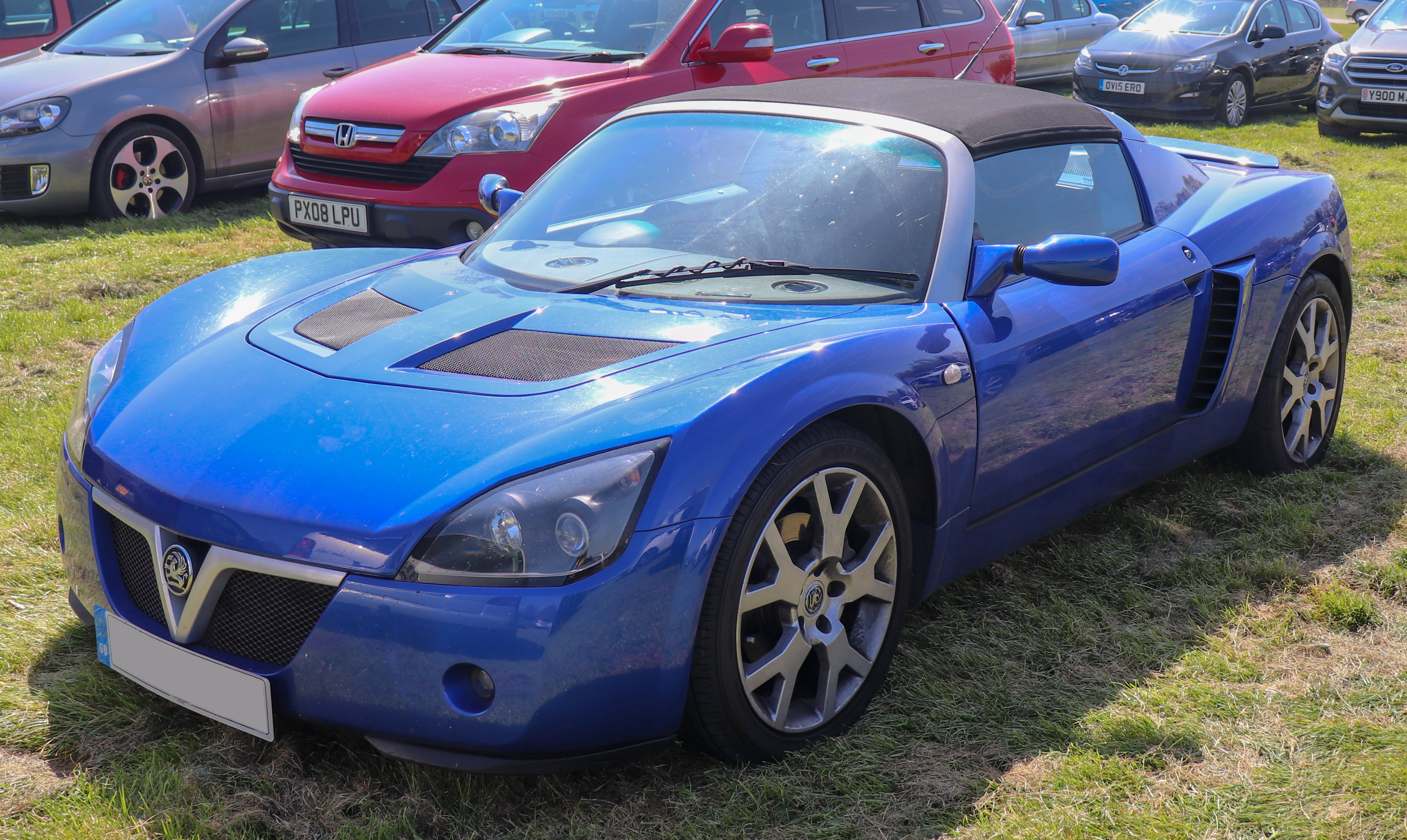
Vauxhall VX220 (United Kingdom)

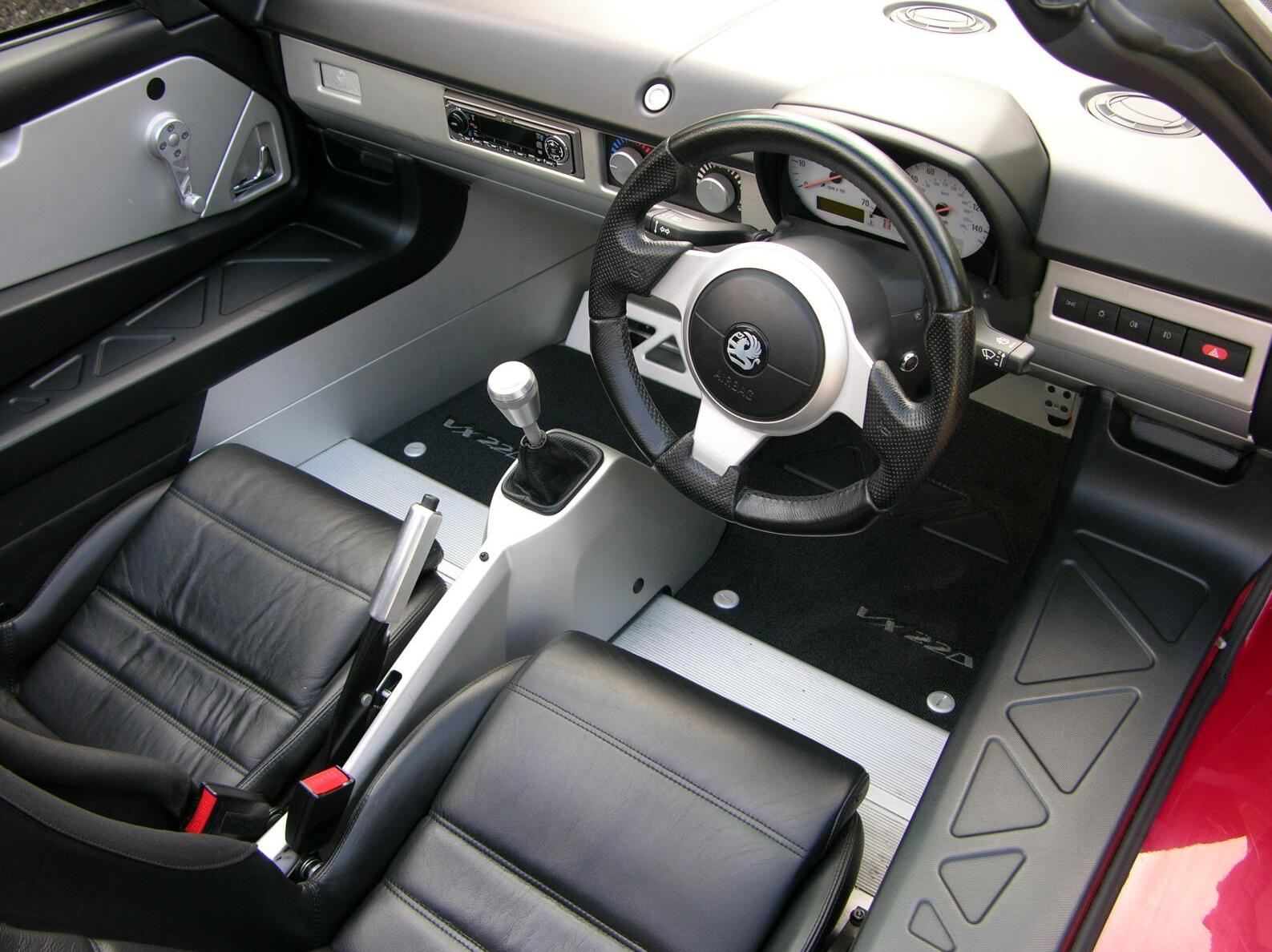
Interior

Due to changes in European crash safety regulations for the 2000 model year, Lotus needed to replace the original Elise. In October 1999, a deal was made between Lotus and General Motors in order for the former to gain sufficient funds to develop a new Elise. As part of the deal, Lotus agreed to develop and produce the Opel Speedster and Vauxhall VX220 on a variation of its new Series 2 Elise chassis, having a 30mm longer wheelbase and lower door sills compared to its Lotus counterpart. The first Speedster concept car was shown at the 1999 Geneva Motor Show.

Whilst the new Elise would use a 1.8 L (110 cu in) Toyota ZZ engine, similar to that found in the Toyota Celica, the Speedster was designed to use a 2.2 L (130 cu in) GM Ecotec engine from the Opel Astra. Neither engine had been used in the original Elise, which was fitted with a 1.8-litre Rover K-Series engine.

In order to accommodate the production of the new cars, Lotus expanded its Hethel factory to a capacity of 10,000 cars, with around 3,500 slots allocated towards the Speedster. Production of the Speedster commenced in March 2001.

The Speedster utilized an aluminium frame that weighed only 72 kg (159 lb), and bodywork made entirely of fibreglass. The entire car weighed 875 kg (1,929 lb), making it roughly 100 kg (220 lb) lighter than the similarly sized Toyota MR2. The Speedster's all-aluminium alloy 2.2 L Z22SE engine produced 145 hp (147 PS; 108 kW), making the Speedster considerably more powerful than the Series 2 Elise was at launch.

== Production ==
As an answer to calls for a more powerful version of the Speedster, Opel introduced a new two-litre turbocharged version of the Ecotec engine, which produced 200 hp (203 PS; 149 kW), but also weighed slightly more at 930 kg (2,050 lb).

In 2004, a limited run of sixty track-focused Speedsters were produced for the United Kingdom. The Vauxhall VXR220 was equipped with larger brakes, upgraded tyres and lowered suspension, and tuned to produce 220 hp (223 PS; 164 kW). Other features included further performance-oriented seats and unique Speedline alloy wheels. The wheels were 16 inches at the front and 17 inches at the rear, the same as on the Elise. Calypso Red was the only available exterior colour.

The turbocharged Speedster was able to reach a top speed of 242 km/h (150 mph) and accelerate from 0 to 100 km/h (62 mph) in 4.7 seconds.

In 2005, General Motors introduced a Daewoo badged Vauxhall VX220 at Incheon International Airport in South Korea at the GM Daewoo showroom. However, only one was built for marketing purposes while the car was sold as an Opel Speedster.

In April 2001, comedian Griff Rhys Jones was dismissed by Vauxhall following a 2000 advert for the VX220 in which he dressed like a woman. The advert drew negative attention, and Vauxhall stated that they wanted to move in a different direction. The advert was also voted "Worst of the Year" by an industry magazine.

Production ended on 22 July 2005, after five years, with no direct successor. It was not until February 2007, when GM Europe adopted the Pontiac Solstice/Saturn Sky into the Opel GT, that GM Europe had a replacement sector product, albeit with no RHD version for the United Kingdom. The final production number of the Speedster was only 7,207.

== Opel ECO Speedster ==
Opel ECO Speedster
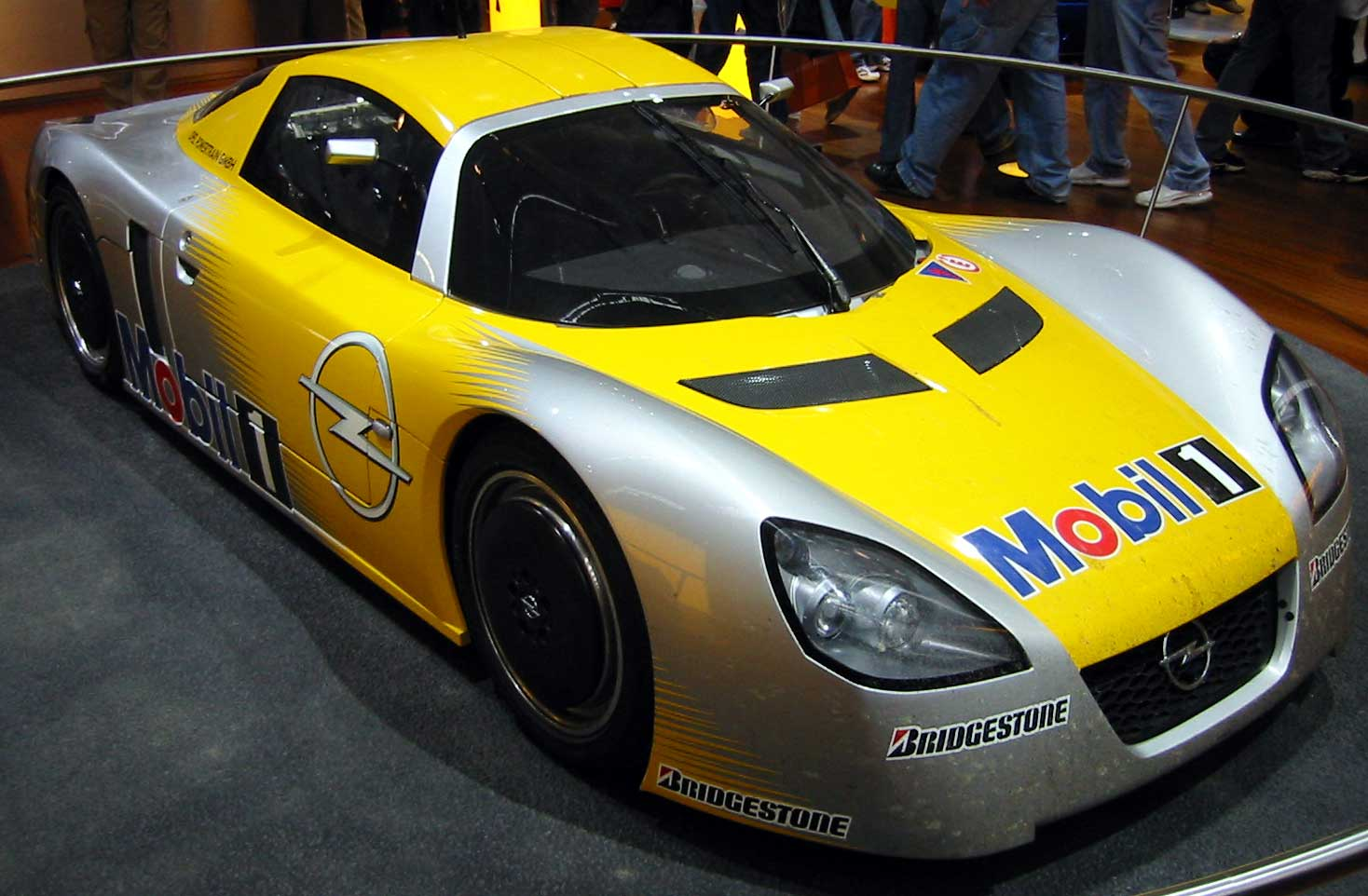

Overview
- Manufacturer: Opel (General Motors)
- Production: 2002 (Concept car)

Body and chassis
- Class: Sports car
- Body style: 2-door coupé
- Layout: Transverse rear mid-engine, rear-wheel-drive
- Doors: Gullwing doors

Powertrain
- Engine: 1.3 L CDTI I4
- Transmission: 5-speed Easytronic automated manual

Dimensions
- Curb weight: 660 kg (1,455 lb)

The Opel ECO Speedster is a concept car made by Opel in 2002, first displayed at the 2002 Paris Motor Show. Related to the production Opel Speedster, it is a two-door coupe with two seats, gullwing doors, and no wing mirrors. The vehicle was designed to combine high speed with maximum fuel efficiency, minimizing weight and drag and fitting a small but comparably powerful diesel engine. The ECO Speedster picked up a theme Opel had started earlier: in 1970, Opel introduced the Opel GT Diesel Rekordwagen to promote their first diesel engine by beating sundry speed records. The 1.3-litre Ecotec CTDI engine produces 112 PS (82 kW), which was enough for a 250 km/h (155 mph) top speed and a fuel consumption of 2.5 L/100 km (113 mpg_{‑imp}; 94 mpg_{‑US}) according to the manufacturer.
