= Ford Iosis =

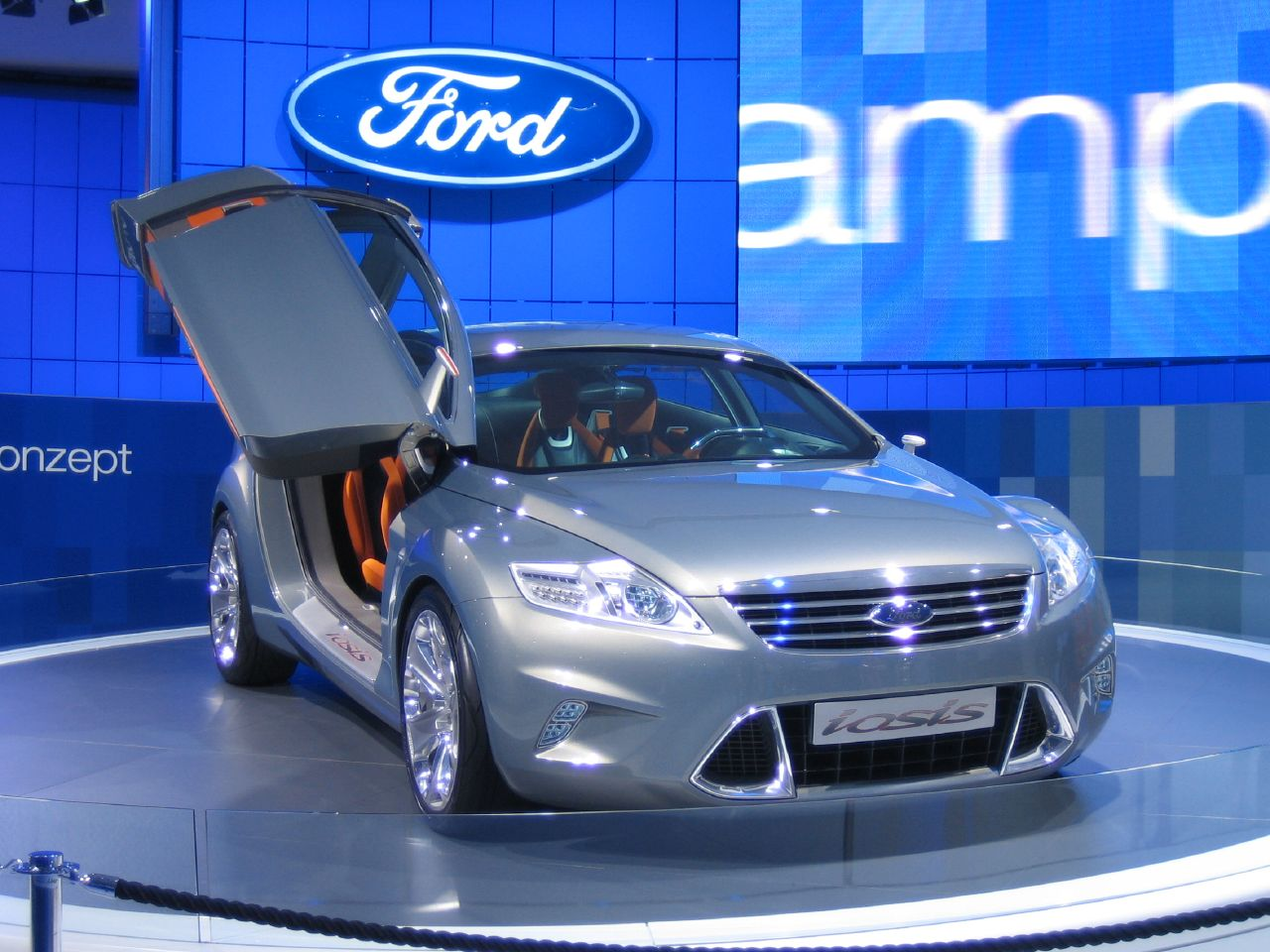

Overview
- Manufacturer: Ford Europe
- Production: 2005

Body and chassis
- Class: Concept car
- Body style: 4-door saloon
- Doors: Butterfly

The Ford Iosis was a four-door saloon concept car developed by Ford Europe. It first was shown to the public at the 2005 Frankfurt Motor Show. Along with the Ford SAV (shown earlier that year at the Geneva Auto Show), it was designed to showcase the dynamic new design, the Ford Kinetic Design, direction Ford intended to pursue for the European market.

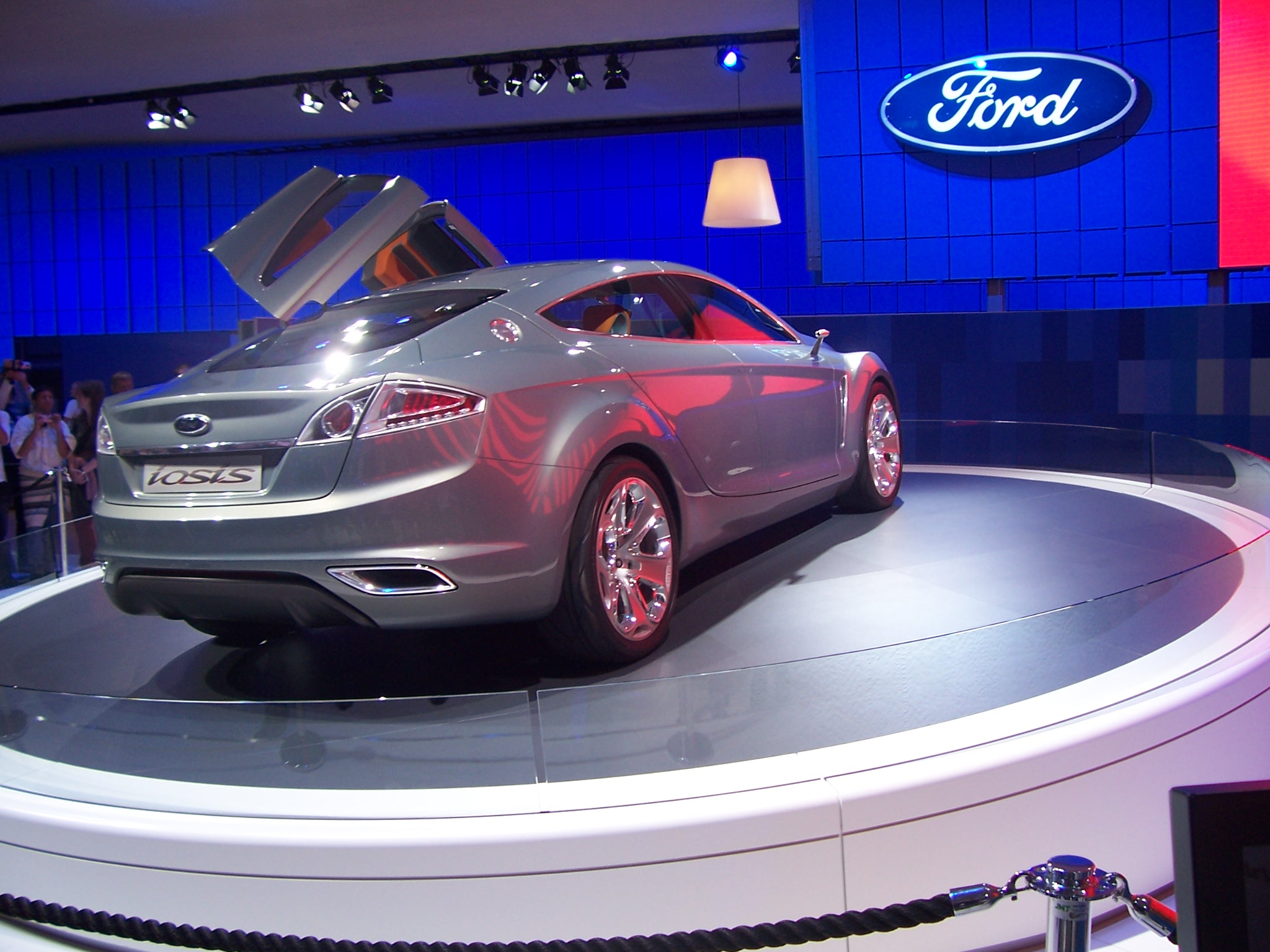
Rear view

The shape of the concept car has been said to resemble an Aston Martin, featuring clean angles, a sharply sloped windscreen and large wheels.

== Iosis X ==
Ford Iosis X

Overview
- Production: 2006

Body and chassis
- Body style: 5-door crossover SUV
- Platform: Ford C1 platform
- Doors: Suicide

Powertrain
- Engine: 2.5 L 5-cylinder (gasoline or diesel)

The following year at the 2006 Paris Motor Show Ford presented the Iosis X, an SUV concept sharing the Iosis design language, which eventually led to the Ford Kuga.

== Iosis-MAX ==
Ford Iosis-MAX
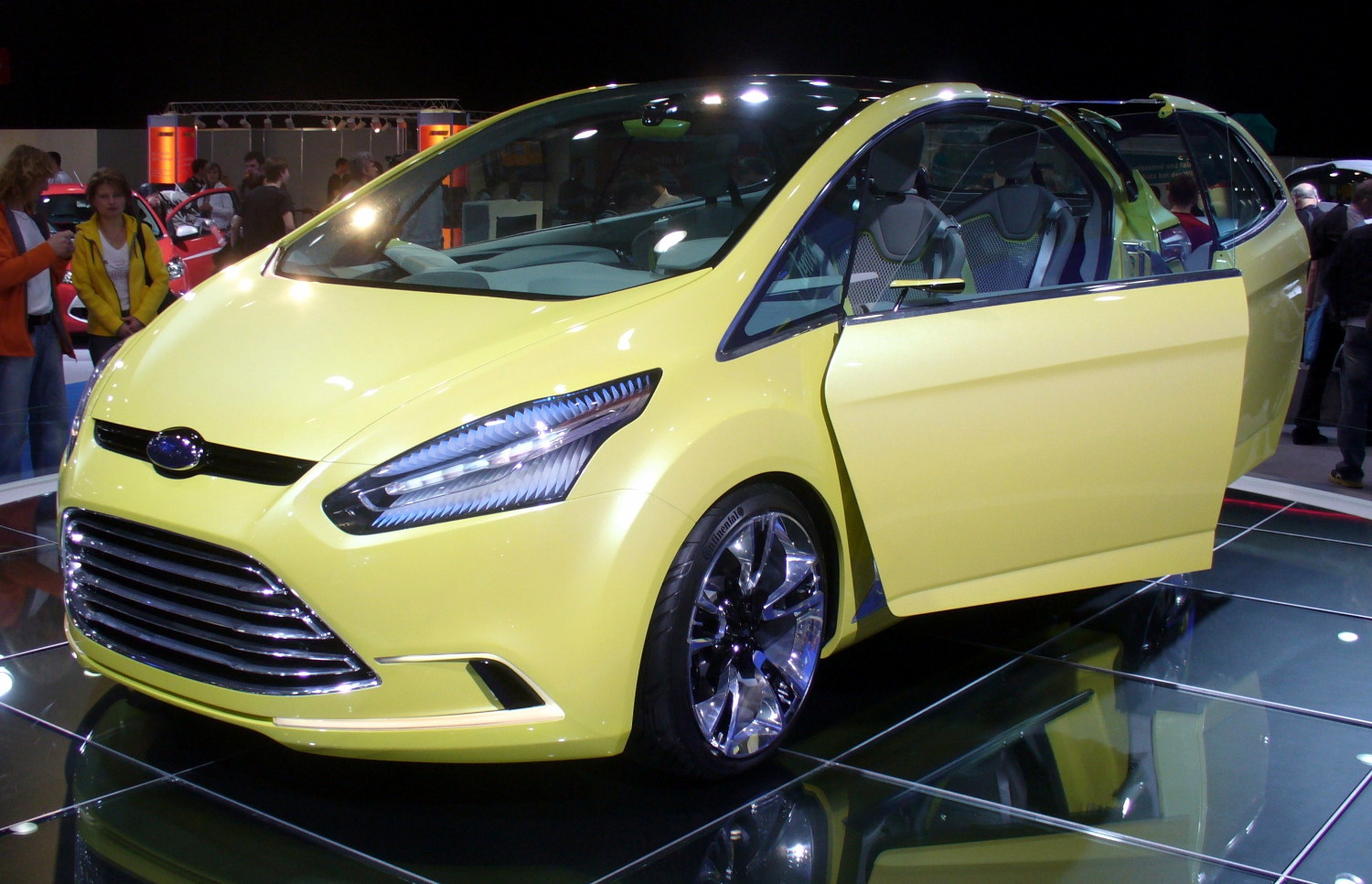
- The Iosis-MAX at the 2009 Geneva Auto Show

Overview
- Production: 2009

Body and chassis
- Body style: 5-door hatchback
- Doors: Front: Conventional; Rear: Sliding

Powertrain
- Engine: 1.6 L turbocharged EcoBoost I4
- Transmission: 6-speed PowerShift dual-clutch AMT

It was a vision for Ford's next generation compact multi-activity vehicle (MAV) and hinted at the design direction of Ford's next global C-cars. It featured the Ford Kinetic Design using lightweight materials and advanced aerodynamics. Key aerodynamic features were the rear door pillars, the rear wing design, and active front cooling ducts in the main trapezoidal grille which were blanked off when not needed.

The car was unveiled at the 2009 Geneva Auto Show to showcase the evolving states of Ford's Kinetic Design and later evolved into the new generation of the Ford Focus.

== See also ==
- Ford Kinetic Design
