= New Edge (design language) =

Design language used by Ford Motor Company

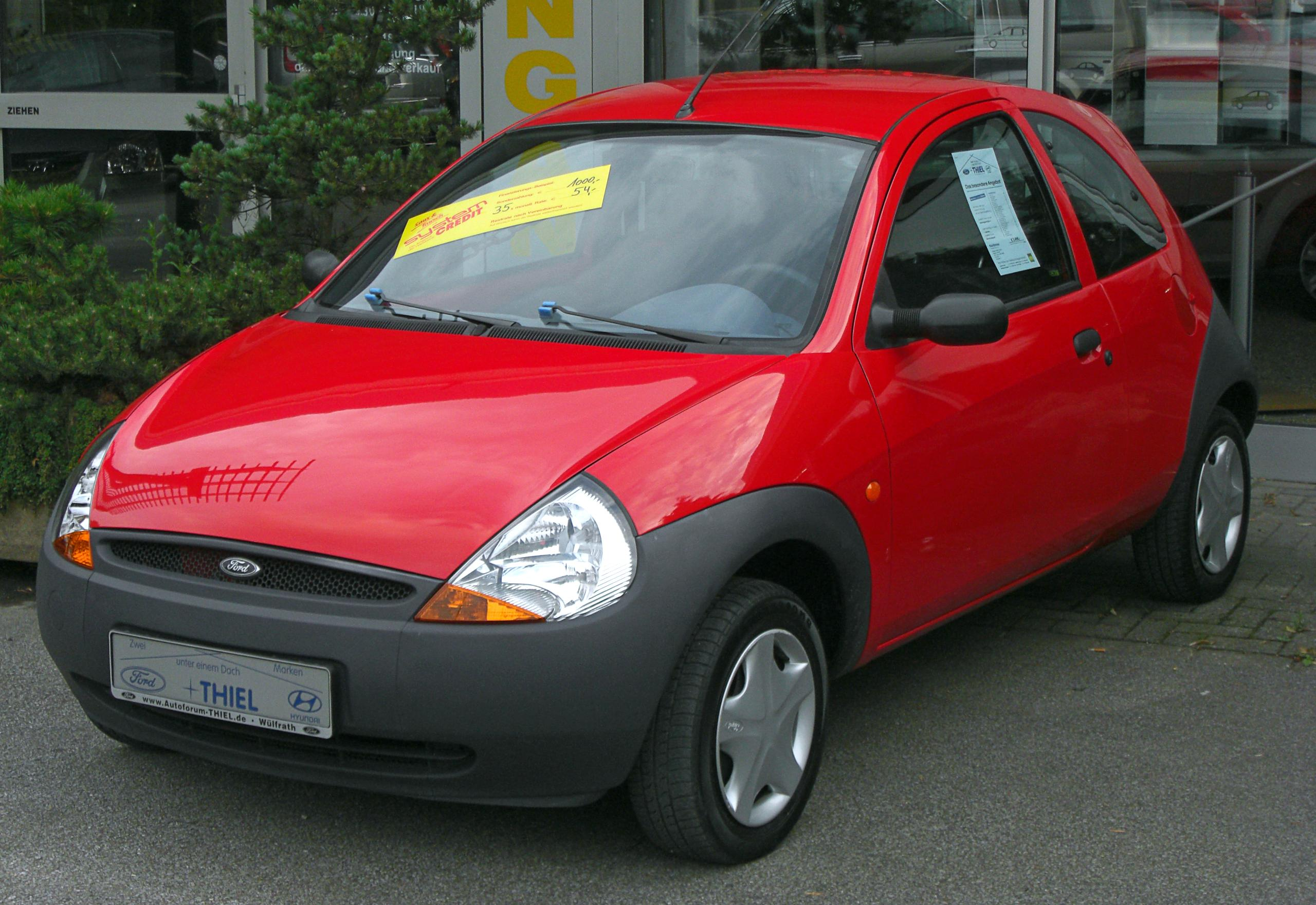
A first-generation Ford Ka, one of the most popular vehicles produced in Ford's New Edge style

New Edge was a design language used by Ford Motor Company for many of its passenger vehicles in the late 1990s and early 2000s and initially authored by Jack Telnack, who served as Vice President of Design for Ford from 1980 to 1997. Under Telnack's oversight, New Edge was implemented by other Ford designers, including Claude Lobo and Australian John Doughty. The first Ford to showcase this design was their supercar concept, the GT90.

New Edge distinctively combined intersecting arcs and other features, creating "surface tension by adding creases to soft aerodynamic shapes." Describing the 2000 Ford Focus's implementation of the styling theme, New York Times writer Michelle Krebs said the Focus "features crisp lines and taut surfaces. The Focus will not be mistaken for anything else on the road. I found more people liked its look than hated it, and few were indifferent." Reputedly, New Edge design saved production time, the edges themselves ostensibly making the panels much easier to align.

After the international Ford Focus had won the prestigious European Car of the Year (1999), William Diem of the New York Times wrote, "To some extent, the prize vindicates Ford's risky design for the Focus, especially the New Edge styling -- a combination of straight lines, curves and planes."

The styling theme began to be replaced by Kinetic Design in 2006 with the Ford S-Max and Ford Galaxy.

== Vehicles with New Edge design ==
=== Europe ===
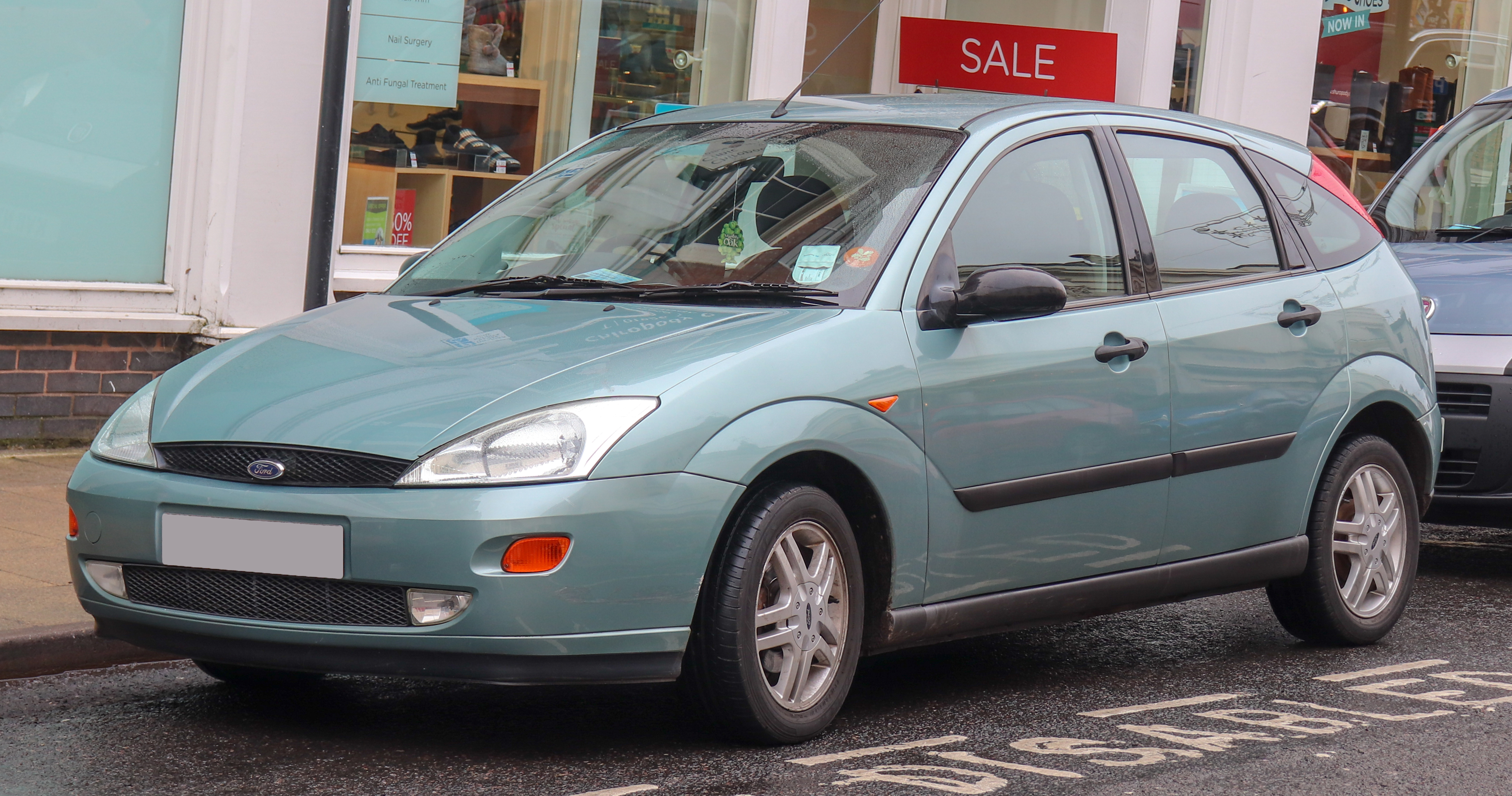
The Ford Focus featured New Edge.

The concept Ford GT90 in 1995 was the first car to feature New Edge styling. The following year, the Ford Ka became the first production vehicle using the styling, followed by the revised Mondeo in 1996, the Puma in 1997, the Focus in 1998, and the Cougar. The Ford Fiesta received a facelift incorporating a New Edge front end in 1999. Although Ford did not release any further New Edge designs, notable New Edge features continued on Ford of Europe models; namely the trapezoidal grille and large, extended wheel arches.

=== North America ===
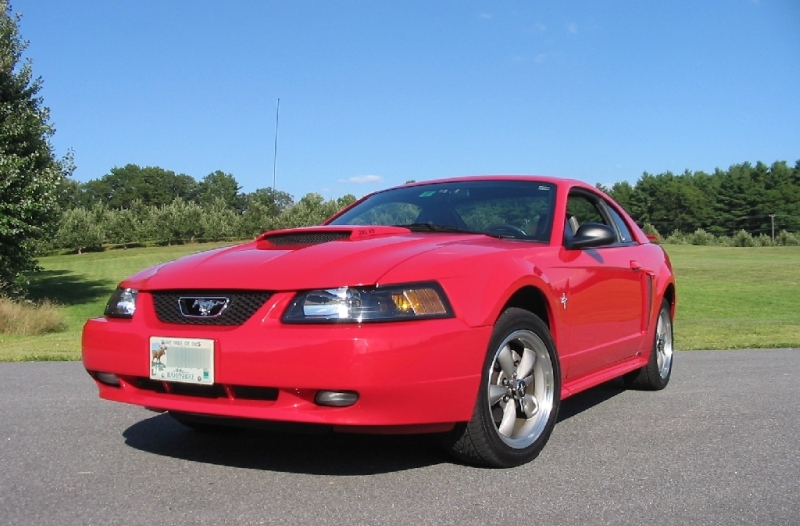
The New Edge Mustang

In North America, New Edge was employed for the Ford Mustang's 1999 facelift of the fourth generation pony car (1994–2004). New Edge elements were also used on their other more conventional vehicles, like the Ford Taurus, Ford Windstar, and Ford Explorer, which were all redesigned at the turn of the century. European designed New Edge models that were sold in North America comprised the Ford Focus and eighth-generation Mercury Cougar, sold as the Ford Cougar in Europe.

=== Australia ===
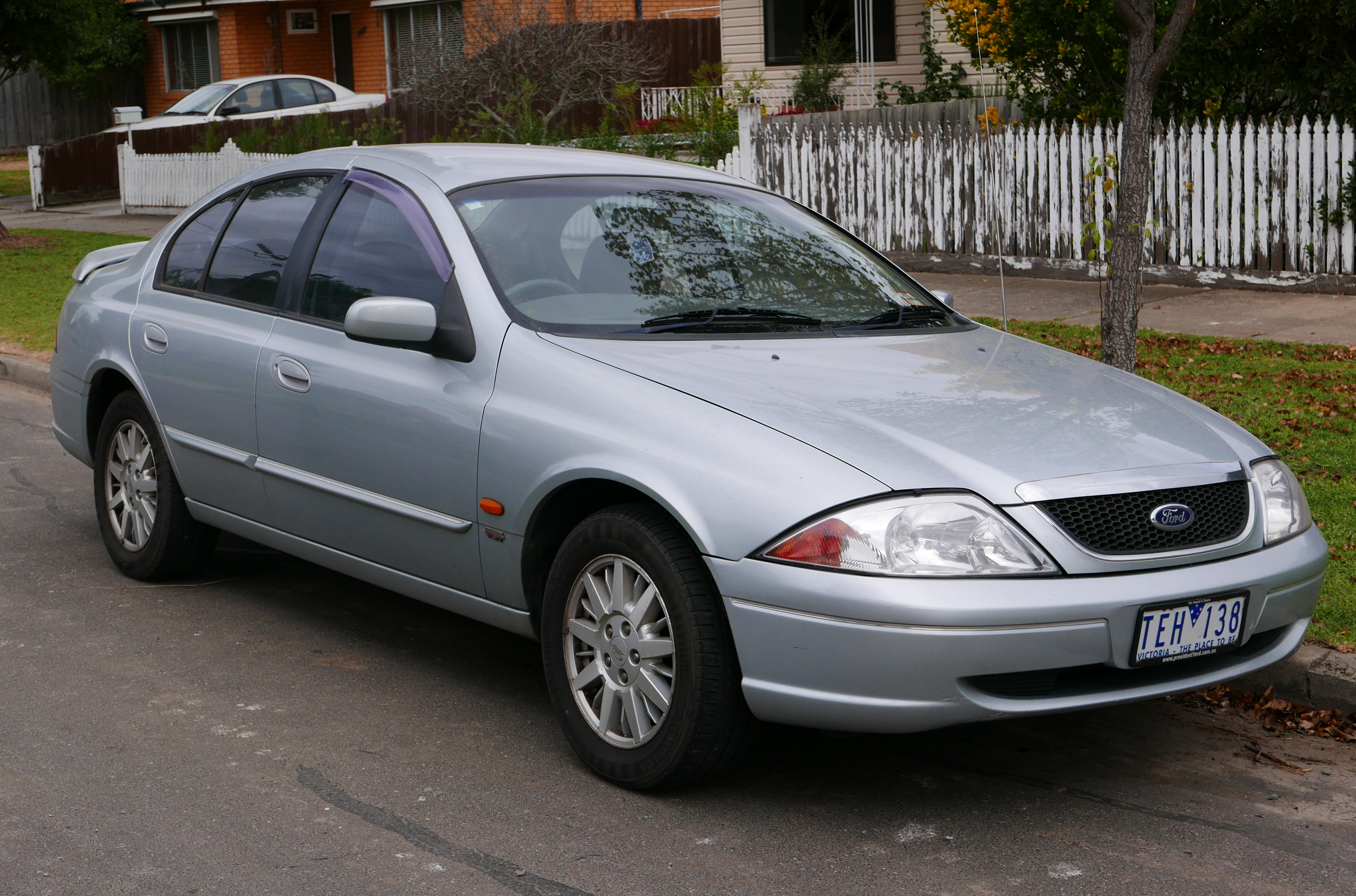
The AU Falcon incorporated New Edge design.

Ford Australia employed New Edge with the Falcon for its "AU" model, which was first released in 1998. Ford chose a bold direction for the Falcon's design. The experiment did not prove successful, as the Australian public largely rejected the design, with droves of buyers deciding to upgrade to a VT Commodore or a Toyota Camry instead. It consisted of drooping headlamps and taillights, with sharp angles employed incongruously to rounded surfaces. The wheel wells bulged to the point where any size of wheel appeared too small for the car. The flagship models, the XR6, XR8 and Ford Fairmont looked more appealing to customers, and the AUII update improved the stance of the range. Ford gave the Falcon an extensive exterior upgrade, as well as mechanical upgrade, in 2002. The upgrade has since been lauded by the press and performed well in the market. The 2002 exterior refresh served as the basis of the Falcon's design from then through to 2012, and probably beyond.
