= Ford SAV =

Minivan concept car by Ford Europe

The Ford SAV (an acronym for Sports Activity Vehicle, not to be confused with BMW's term for SUVs) was a seven-seater large MPV concept car developed by Ford Europe. It was first displayed to the public at the 2005 Geneva Motor Show and was intended as a styling exercise to show the new direction for Ford's designs in the European market. Ford introduced this model one year later as the Ford S-MAX with slight modifications for mass production. The S-MAX was sportier than the Ford Galaxy and felt closer to the large family car Ford Mondeo.

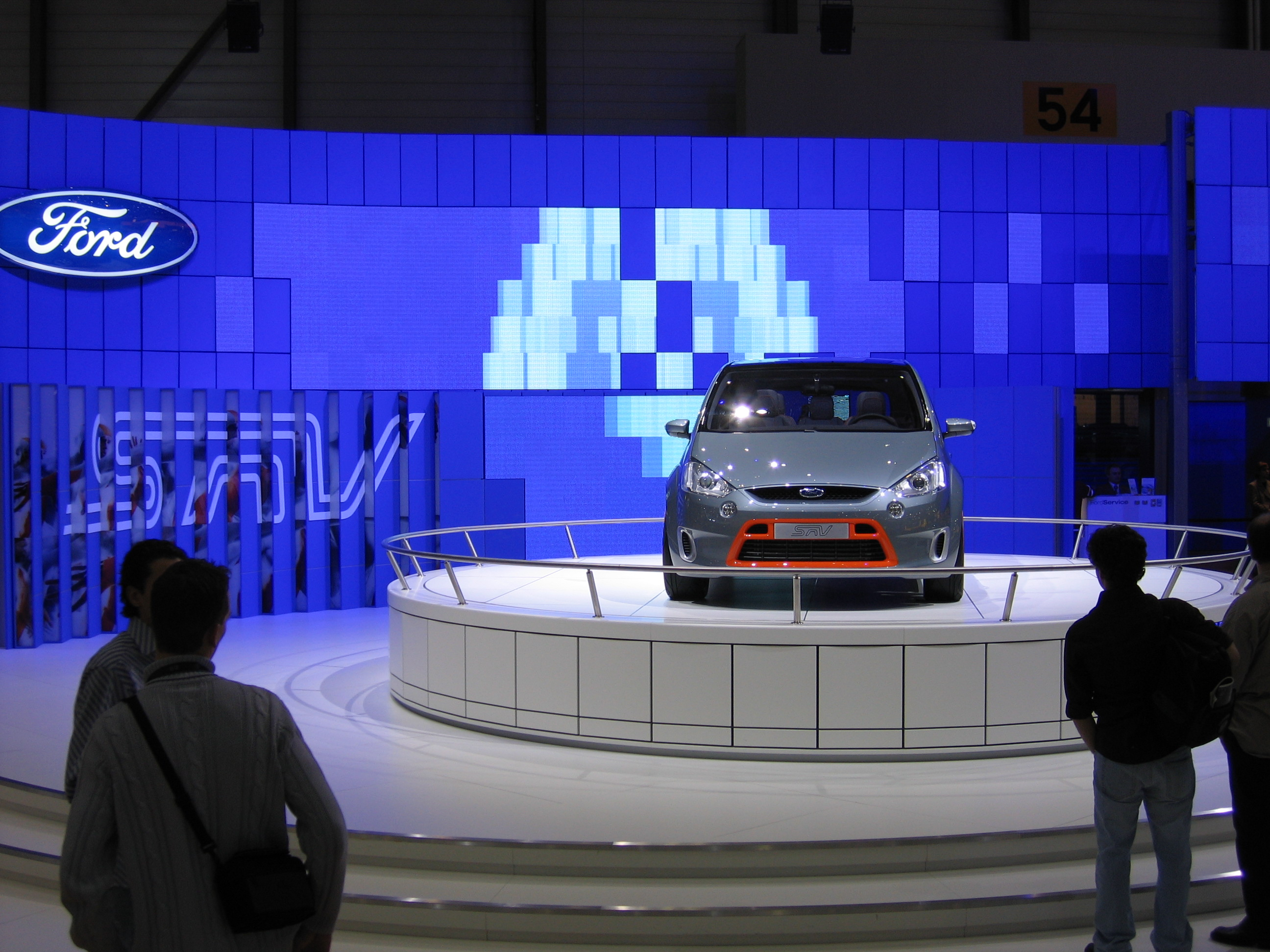
Ford SAV at the 2005 Geneva Motor Show

Being larger than the Mondeo and smaller than the Galaxy, it was designed with flexibility of use in mind. The seating used the "Business Class" flexible rear seating design first seen on the Ford Focus C-MAX; electric motors allowed easy rearrangement of the rear seating for passenger comfort or adjusting them to permit for more cargo room. Exterior, the design was intended to bring a more aggressive feel to the current Ford design philosophy. It had a steeply sloped windscreen and an arching roofline that blurred the line between minivan and sport utility vehicle.
