= Ford Mustang (sixth generation) =

American pony car

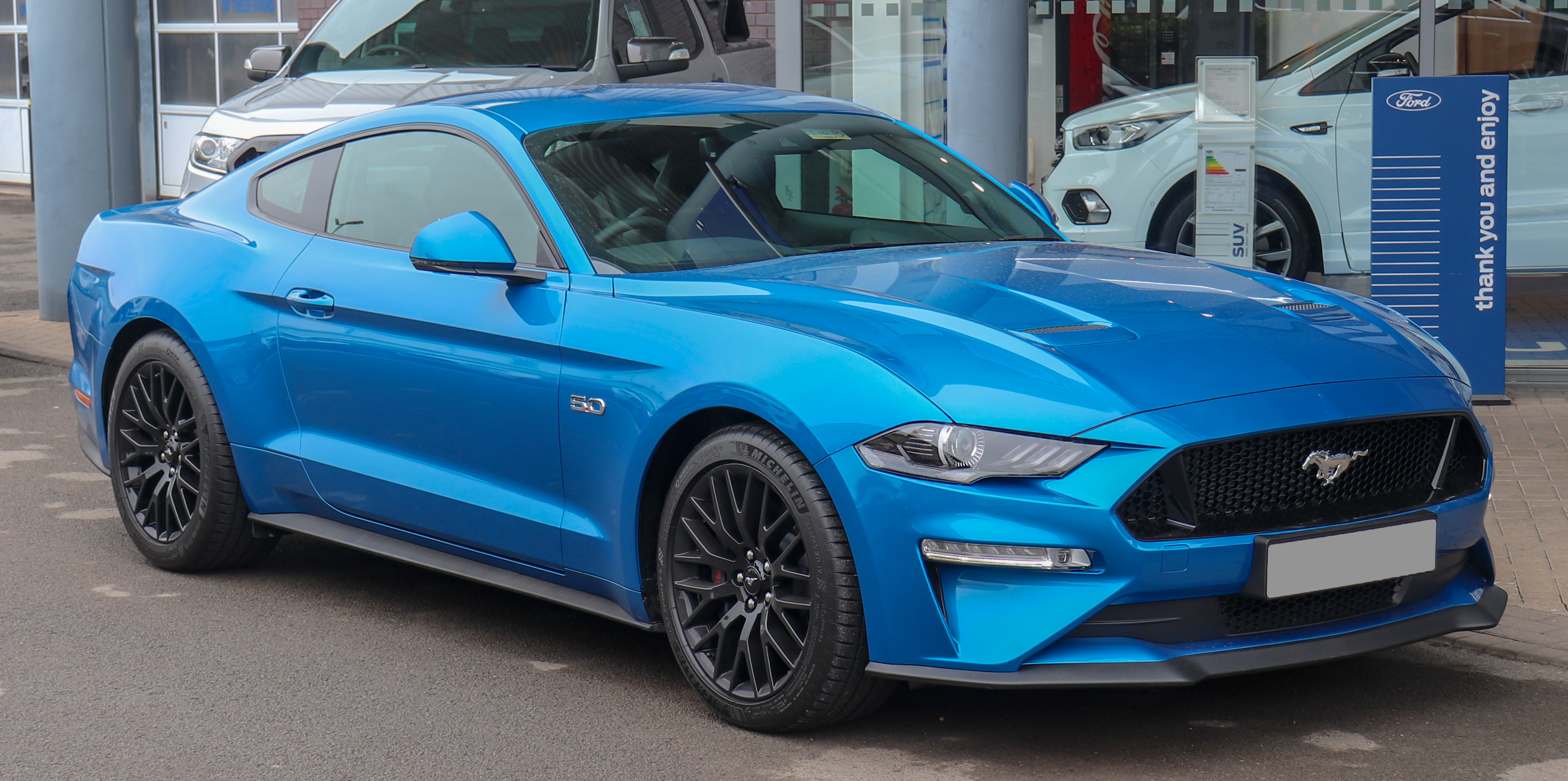

Overview
- Manufacturer: Ford
- Model code: S550
- Production: August 2014 – April 2023
- Model years: 2015–2023
- Assembly: United States: Flat Rock, Michigan (Flat Rock Assembly Plant)
- Designer: Kemal Curić (exterior); Sewon Chun, Michael Thomson (interior)

Body and chassis
- Class: Pony car, muscle car
- Body style: 2-door coupe 2-door convertible
- Layout: Front-engine, rear-wheel-drive
- Platform: Ford D2C

Powertrain
- Engine: 2.3 L EcoBoost turbo I4; 3.7 L Cyclone V6 (2015–2017); 5.0 L Coyote V8; 5.2 L Voodoo V8 (Shelby GT350/GT350R); 5.2 L Predator V8 (Shelby GT500)
- Transmission: 6-speed Getrag/Ford MT82 manual; 6-speed Tremec TR-3160 manual; 6-speed 6R80 automatic; 7-speed Tremec TR-9070 dual-clutch; 10-speed 10R80 automatic

Dimensions
- Wheelbase: 107.1 in (2,720 mm)
- Length: 188.5 in (4,788 mm); 188.9–189.7 in (4,798–4,818 mm) (Shelby)
- Width: 75.4 in (1,915 mm); 75.9–76.6 in (1,928–1,946 mm) (Shelby)
- Height: 54.3–54.9 in (1,379–1,395 mm); 53.6–54.2 in (1,361–1,377 mm) (Shelby)
- Curb weight: 3,491–4,171 lb (1,583–1,892 kg)

Chronology
- Predecessor: Ford Mustang (fifth generation)
- Successor: Ford Mustang (seventh generation)

The Ford Mustang (S550) is the sixth generation of the Ford Mustang, a pony car produced from 2014 until it was replaced by the seventh generation in 2023.

The development of the Mustang began in 2009 under the direction of the chief engineer Dave Pericak and exterior design director Joel Piaskowski. In 2010, design management selected an exterior design theme proposal by Kemal Curić. After four years of development, Ford debuted the Mustang at numerous online media events in December 2013, preceding its public unveiling at the Detroit Auto Show in January 2014. Official manufacture of the sixth generation of the Mustang began at the facility in Flat Rock, Michigan, in August 2014. The car was available as both a coupe and a convertible.

Introduced for the 2015 model year (Note: It is common practice in the American automotive industry to introduce a model year's automobile during the previous calendar year.) to replace the fifth generation, the Mustang offered multiple engine configurations, including a 3.7-liter V6 engine, a 2.3-liter inline-four EcoBoost engine, and a 5.0-liter GT V8 engine. The V6 was discontinued in 2017. The sixth generation marked the first Mustang to be marketed globally, introducing factory-produced right-hand-drive models alongside the traditional left-hand-drive versions. This was part of the "One Ford" business strategy, which also encompassed models such as the Fiesta, Focus, Fusion/Mondeo, Escape/Kuga, Edge, Transit Connect, and Transit.

Ford released several special editions of the sixth-generation Mustang, including the Shelby GT350 and GT500, the Bullitt edition to commemorate the 50th anniversary of the 1968 film Bullitt, and a model celebrating the Mustang's own 50th anniversary. The car is the recipient of numerous accolades, including Esquire's Car of the Year in 2014, a spot on Car and Driver's 10Best list in 2015 and 2017, and the EyesOn Design award for Best Production Vehicle in 2014. The sixth generation of the Mustang was discontinued in April 2023, with its successor, the S650, beginning production in May.

== Background and development ==
The American automaker Ford Motor Company introduced the fifth generation of the Mustang as a concept vehicle at the North American International Auto Show in 2003. Designed by Sid Ramnarace, production of the fifth-generation Mustang began in September 2004 at the facility in Flat Rock, Michigan. The vehicle was praised by car critics; an anonymous writer for Motor Trend described it as a "muscle car legend reborn" and called its stance "aggressive, [...] made stronger by wheels pushed to the corners", while John Phillips of Car and Driver called its design "terrific" and its sound "great", believing that its "'60s feel, overt muscularity, and attainable price, delivers similar charisma [to the 1964 Mustang]".

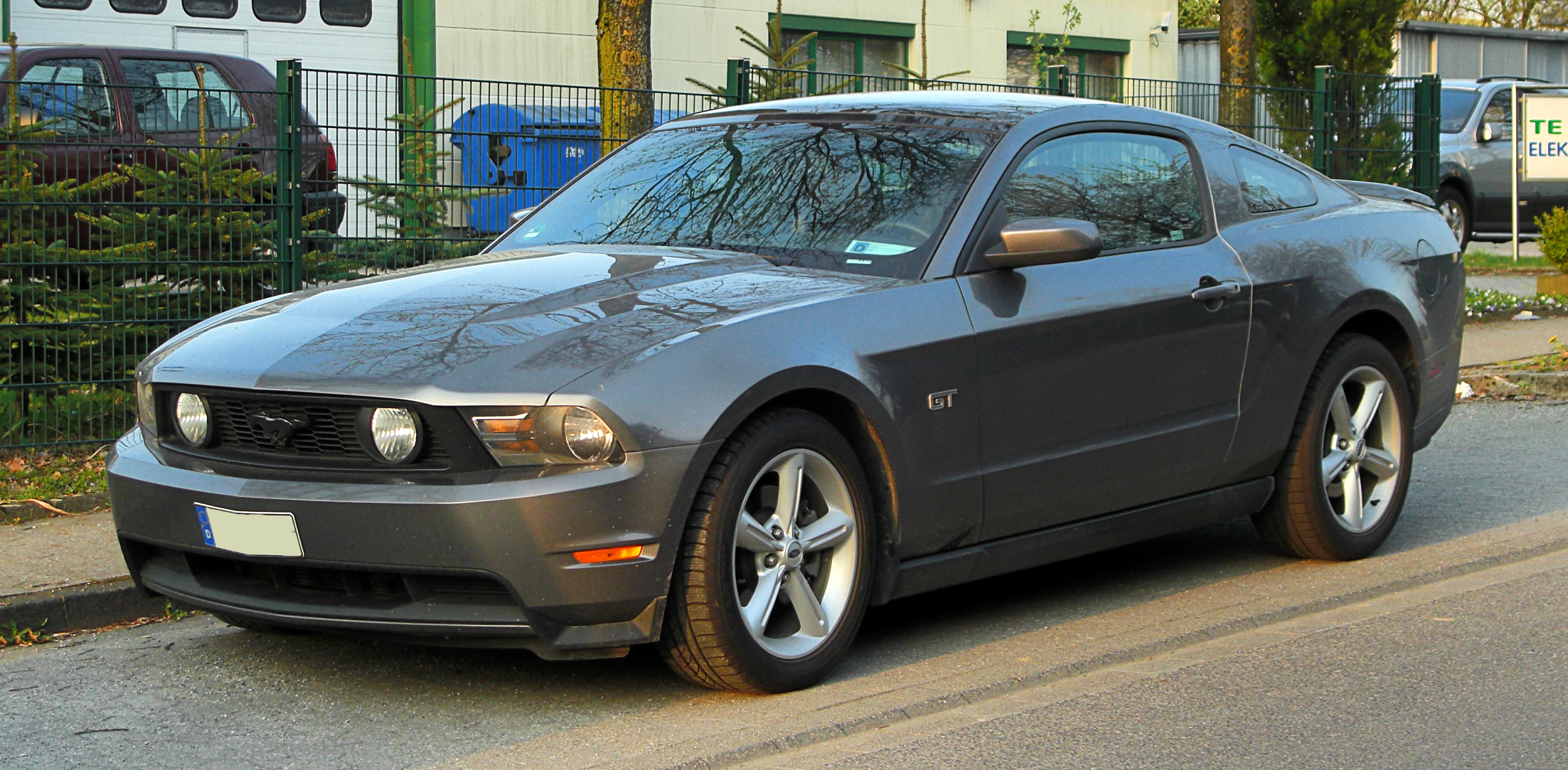
The development of the sixth-generation Mustang began in 2009, coinciding with the facelift of the fifth generation Mustang (pictured).

The fifth-generation model was facelifted in early 2009, the same year that development of a new Mustang model began. The development of this new Mustang was led by chief engineer Dave Pericak, with exterior design directed by Joel Piaskowski. Several designers produced a range of sketches, which were then narrowed down to three final designs for customer feedback to be provided to Piaskowski. In 2010, design management chose an exterior theme proposal by Kemal Curić, who relocated from Europe to Michigan that year to become the exterior design manager at the Dearborn design studio.

The interior design program for the Mustang launched in spring 2010 under the leadership of Doyle Letson and Scott Strong. Early in the development process, a decision was made to equip this generation with an independent rear suspension (IRS), which had previously been standard on the 1999–2004 SVT Cobra. Initially, the plan was to adapt an IRS to the existing S197 platform, which had even been tested with an IRS during its development. However, the inclusion of the IRS led to several platform modifications, including a redesign of the front suspension. An interior design by Sewon Chun, Michael Thomson, and Evan Wilson was selected, and the interior development for the Mustang was completed in June 2012.

Ford presented the sixth-generation Mustang on December 5, 2013, with same-day media events in Dearborn, Michigan, Los Angeles, California, New York City, New York, Barcelona, Spain, Shanghai, China, and Sydney, Australia. The Mustang made its public debut at the North American International Auto Show in January 2014. Over the course of early 2014, the facility in Flat Rock, Michigan, received a US$555 million investment, a portion of which was allocated for Mustang production tooling. At the Flat Rock plant, official series manufacture of the sixth-generation Mustang was initiated on August 28, 2014; a week before this, right-hand drive models began testing. For the first time in its fifty-year history, the Mustang would be available in 120 countries worldwide—including 25 right-hand drive markets—as part of the company's "One Ford" initiative. Manufacture of the right-hand drive Mustangs began on August 24, 2015.

== Design ==
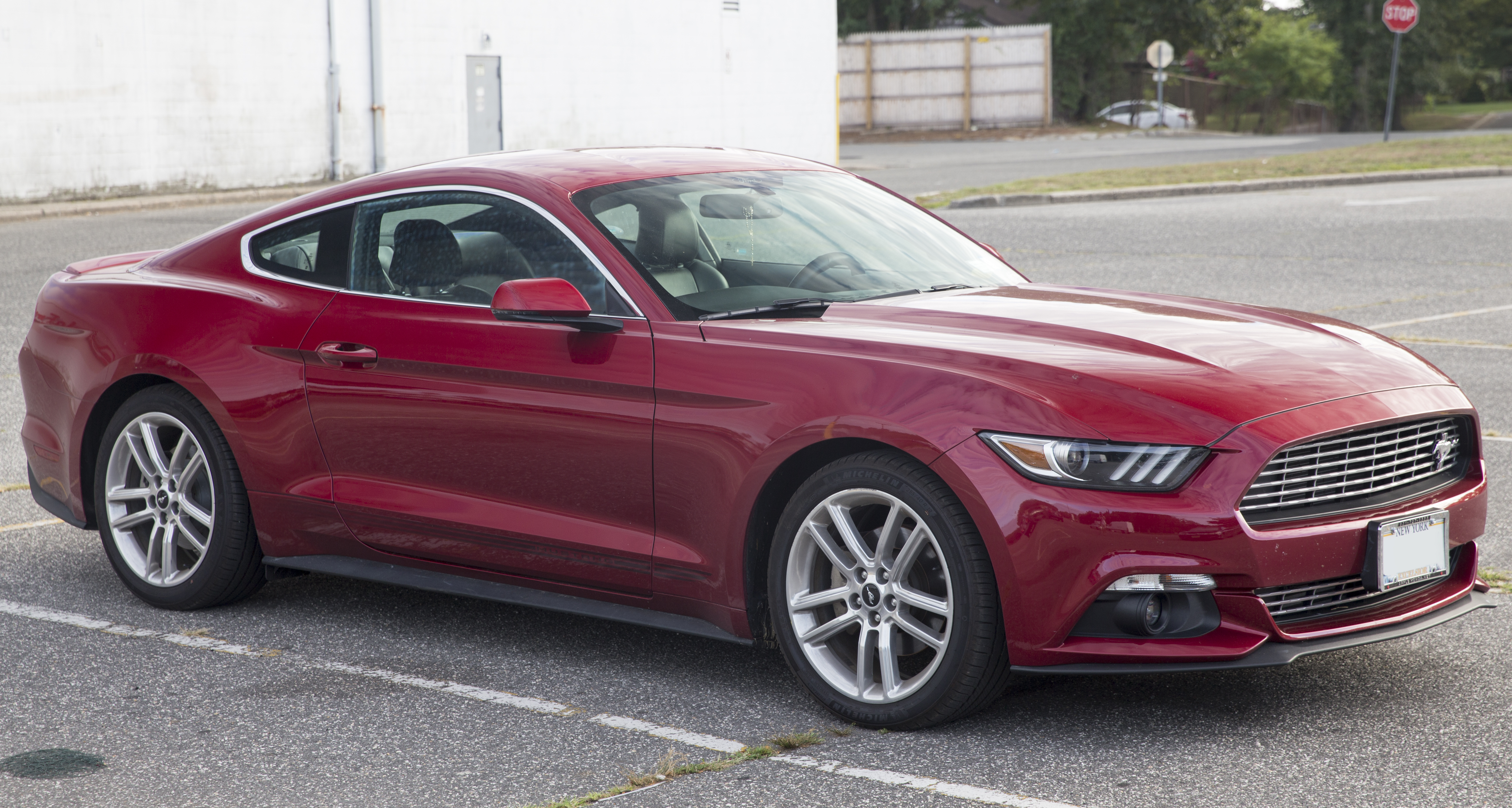
Front view of the pre-facelift model (EcoBoost)

=== Body ===
Since its 1964 debut, the Mustang has been classified as both a pony car and a muscle car. The sixth-generation Mustang is available in both fastback coupe and convertible body styles. Ford incorporated high-strength steel into the chassis and used aluminum for the front fenders and hood, making the new Mustang both stronger and lighter than its predecessor. The sixth-generation Mustang has a weight distribution of 52 percent at the front and 48 percent at the rear for the EcoBoost version and 53 percent at the front and 47 percent and the rear for the GT. Retaining its predecessor's wheelbase and similar dimensions, the sixth-generation Mustang's front and rear track width have been increased by 15 millimeters (0.59 in) and 70 millimeters (2.8 in), respectively.

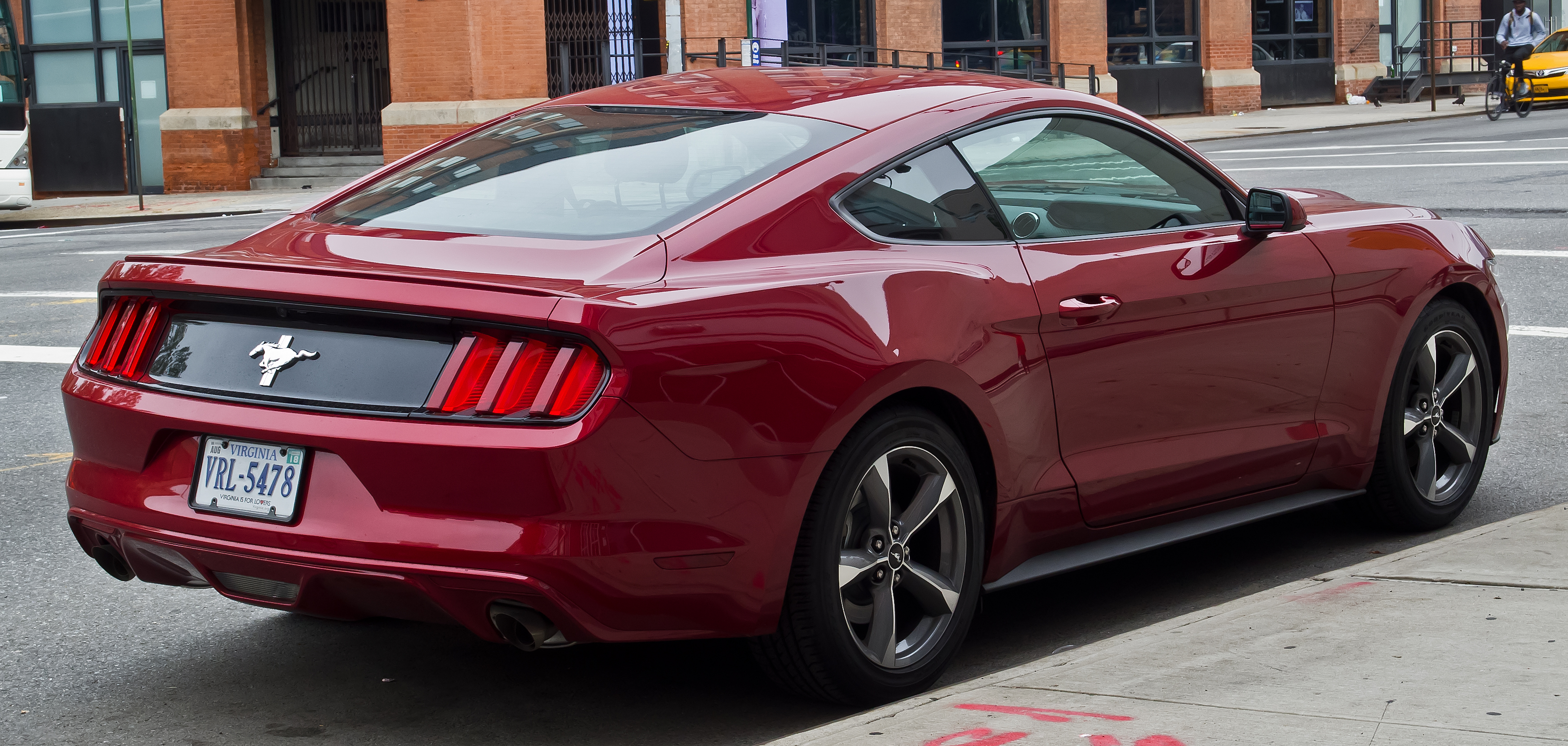

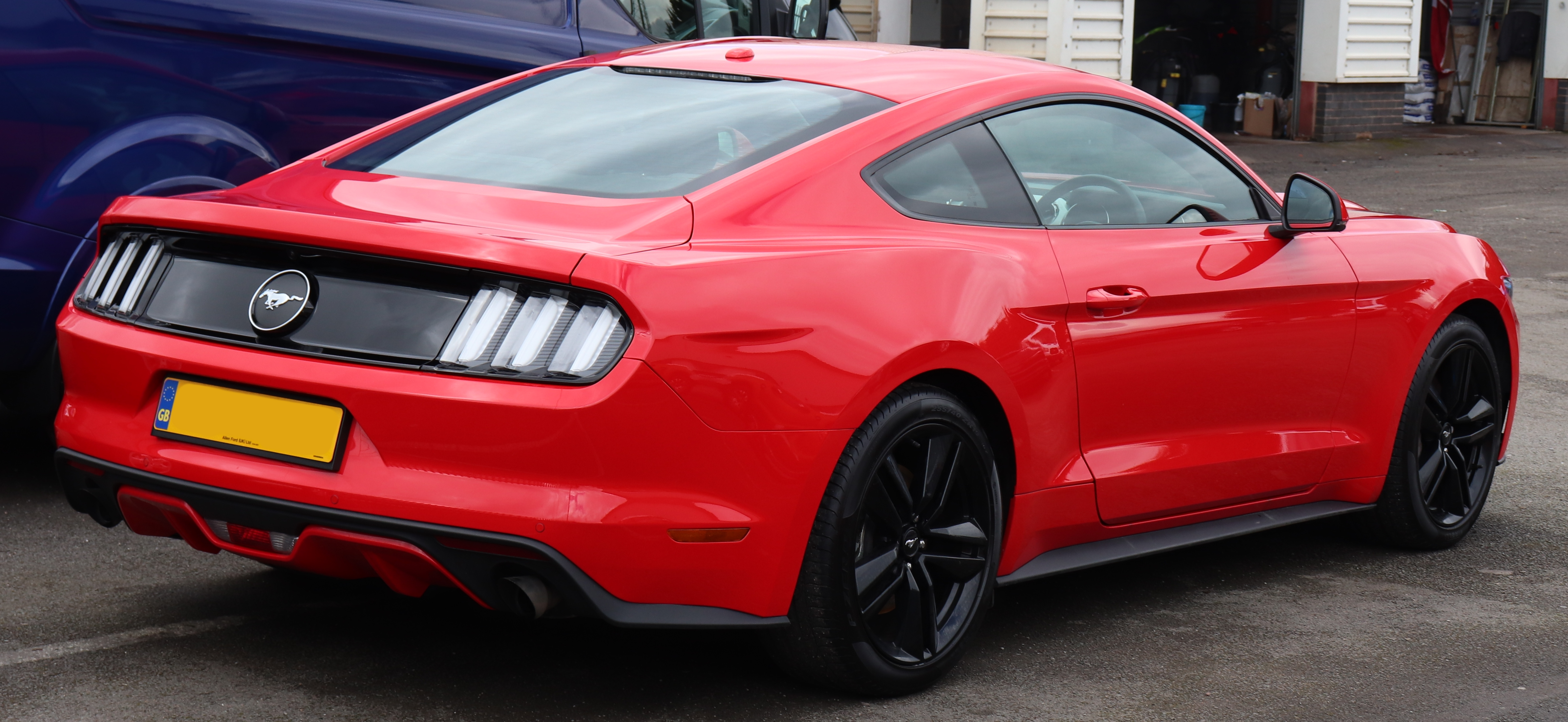
U.S.-specification models (top) feature red taillights, while export-specification models (bottom) are equipped with clear plastic taillights.

The front fascia of the sixth-generation Mustang was inspired by Ford's Evos concept, which was showcased at the Frankfurt Auto Show in 2011. The design features "tri-bar" style taillights that illuminate sequentially as turn signals for North American models. The Mustang incorporates three illuminated daytime running lights on the inner portion of each headlight. The taillight lenses on the U.S.-specification model are red, while export-specification Mustangs feature clear plastic lenses with red illumination, illuminating only the outer portion when the turn signals are activated. The domestic version includes hood vents that are not present on the overseas model due to pedestrian safety regulations. Door mirrors may be larger on the export-specification vehicle due to varying design and safety requirements. The Mustang has a trunk capacity of 13.5 cubic feet (380 L) with its seats up.

The Mustang has the capacity to hold four passengers and uses a rear-wheel drive layout with its engine placed at the front. The vehicle uses a unibody chassis, and is based upon the D2C platform, which it shares with the previous generation. The purpose-built independent rear suspension system incorporates aluminum in the axle housing and rear control arms. To optimize the benefits of the new rear suspension, the Mustang team also redesigned the front suspension, which now features a non-isolated perimeter subframe and double-ball joint MacPherson strut assemblies. The EcoBoost Performance Pack and base GT feature fixed front four-piston calipers and single-piston rear calipers, while the GT Performance Pack includes six-piston Brembo front calipers with 15-inch rotors and a rear single-piston caliper with a larger 13-inch rotor.

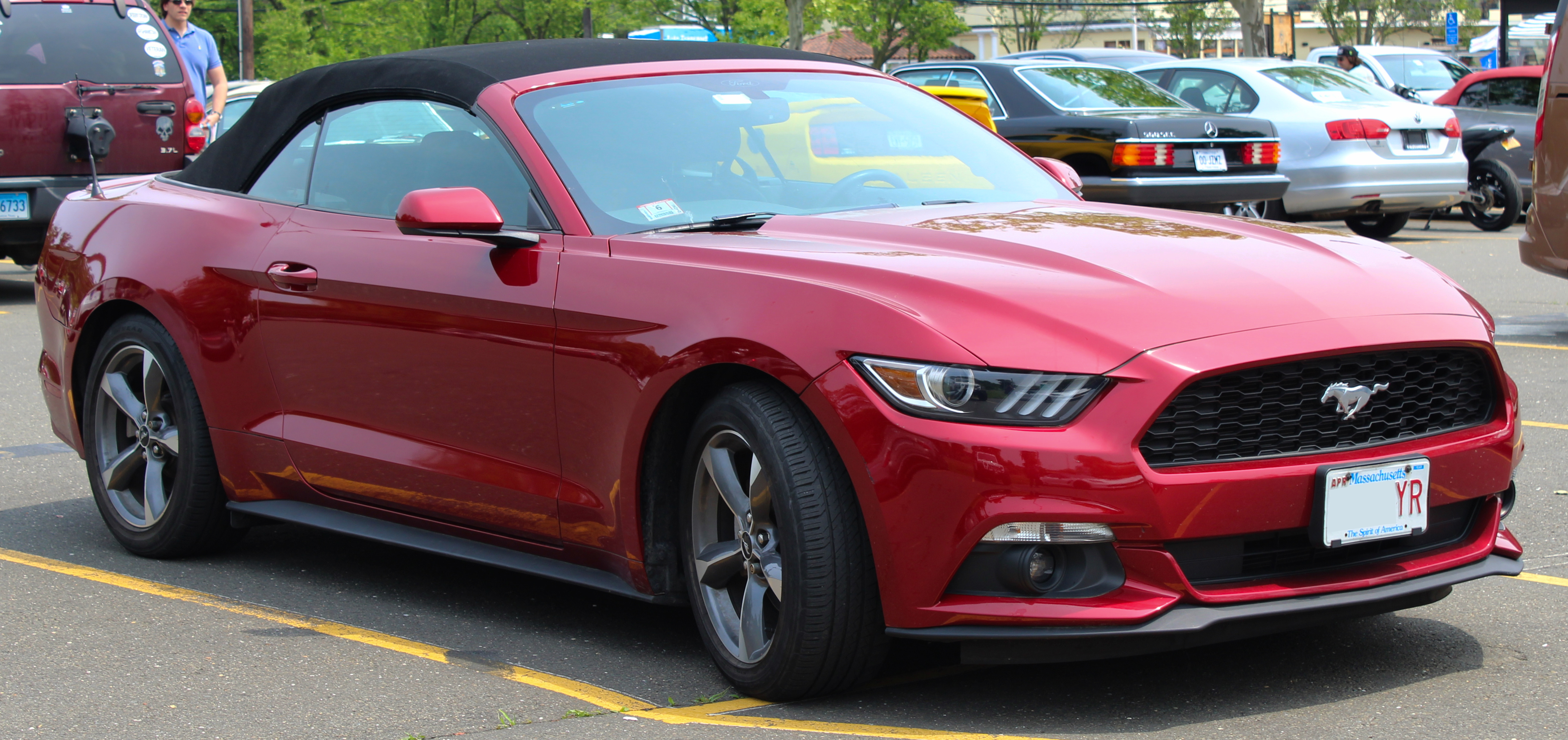
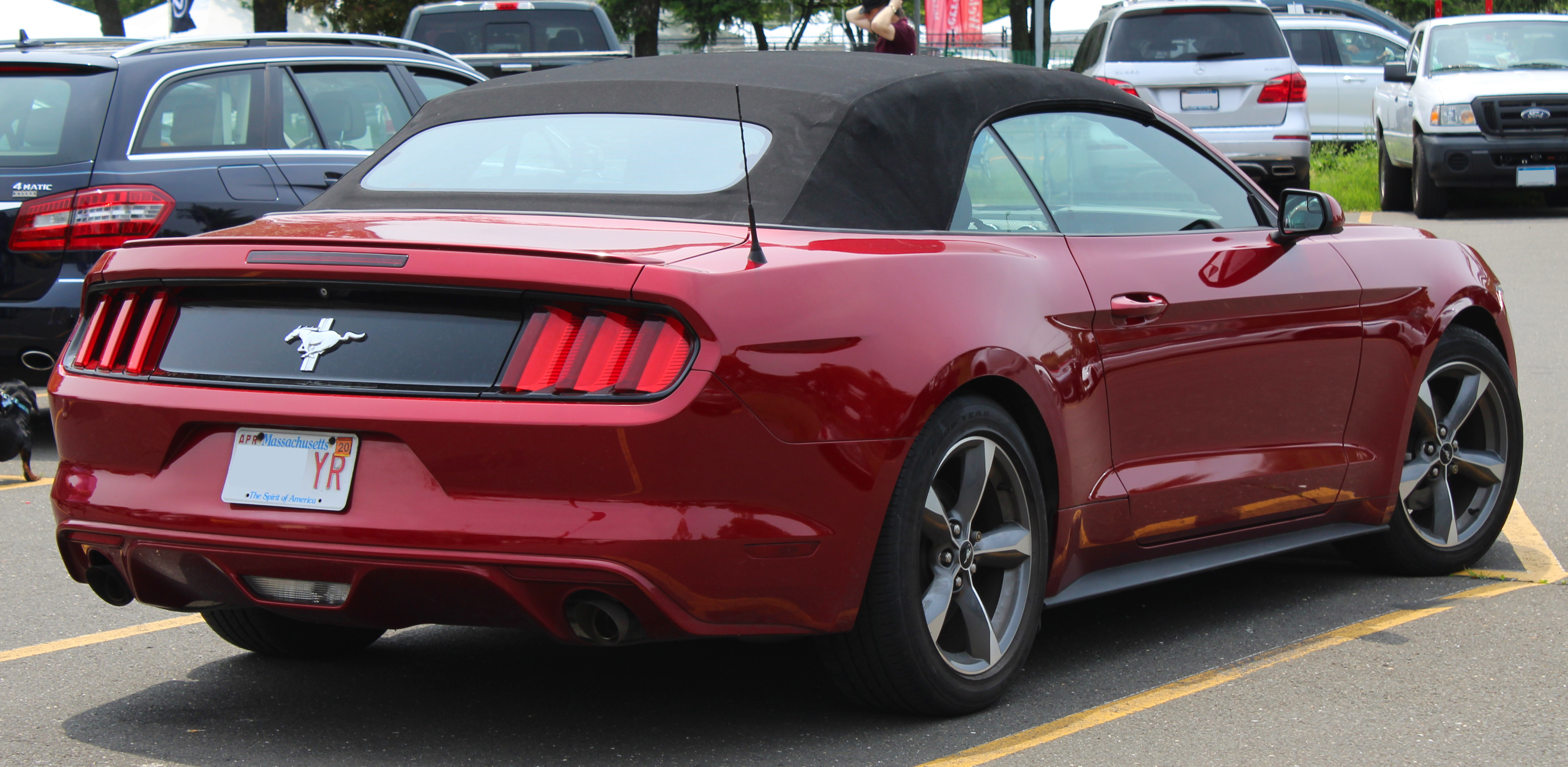
Mustang convertible

In addition to the coupe, Ford produced a convertible version of the Mustang. This new top, developed in partnership with supplier Webasto, is completely electric, making it quieter, slimmer, and simpler than the previous electro-hydraulic system. The top raises and lowers in nearly half the time—seven to ten seconds to lower, and nine to twelve seconds to raise, depending on engine-on or battery-only operation—though it operates only at speeds below 3 miles per hour (4.8 km/h). While a power pull-down mechanism was considered for single-button operation, it was deemed too expensive. Improved water and wind seals were also introduced with the new folding top mechanism. The car has a trunk space of 11.4 cubic feet (320 L), 19 percent more than the previous Mustang convertible.

=== Interior and technology ===
The Mustang's interior design team developed two full-scale clay models before deciding on the final concept. The first model, an evolution of its predecessor, focused on premium materials. The second, which ultimately influenced the production design, featured an aircraft-inspired theme with a long, wing-shaped aluminum span extending from door to door. The aeronautical theme was chosen not only for its aesthetic appeal but also for its practical design, which allowed for a shallower dashboard—an improvement absent in the alternative concept. Letson noted that, "We came up with this as a first for Ford, which was putting the [knee] airbag in the glove-box door. When we came up with this concept, it slimmed everything up considerably".

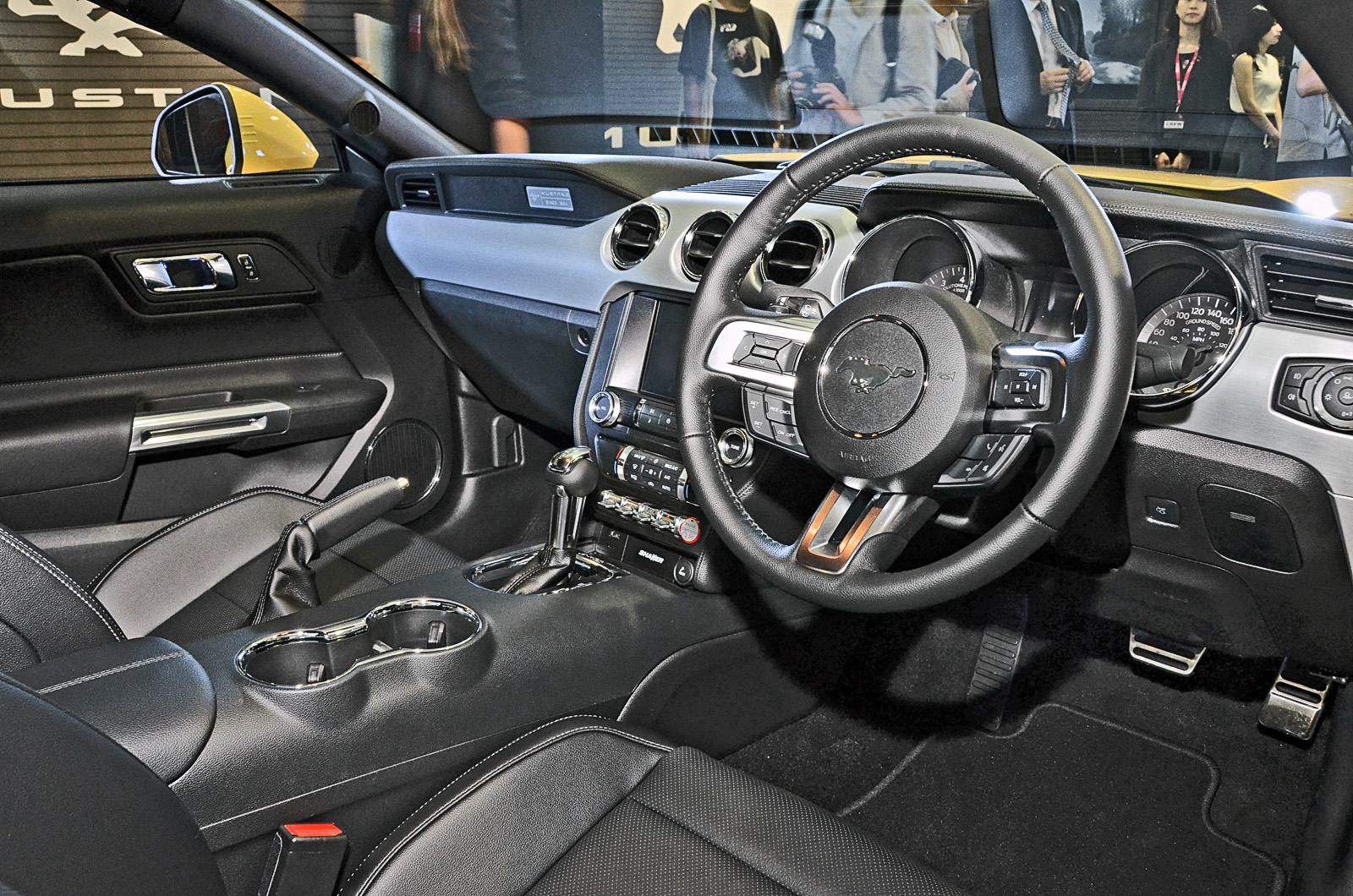
Interior

Standard features for all sixth-generation Mustangs include proximity key entry with keyless entry, a push-button start system, an AM/FM stereo with a single-disc CD/MP3 player, and a color liquid-crystal display. Additional features include the Ford Sync system with Bluetooth hands-free phone capabilities, USB/iPod auxiliary audio input jacks, an electronic traction control system, an electronic stability control system, an anti-lock braking system, and a rear backup camera system. The Mustang is equipped with dual-stage driver and passenger seat-mounted side airbags, dual-stage front airbags for both the driver and passenger, curtain airbags for both the first and second rows, driver and passenger knee airbags, and an airbag occupancy sensor.

Optional features include SiriusXM satellite radio, the MyFord Touch—replaced by the Sync 3 in 2016—infotainment system with an eight-inch touchscreen, support for Apple CarPlay and Android Auto (both introduced in 2017), and enhanced voice control. Additional options included a nine-speaker sound system and a twelve-speaker Shaker Pro surround-sound system.

== Powertrains ==
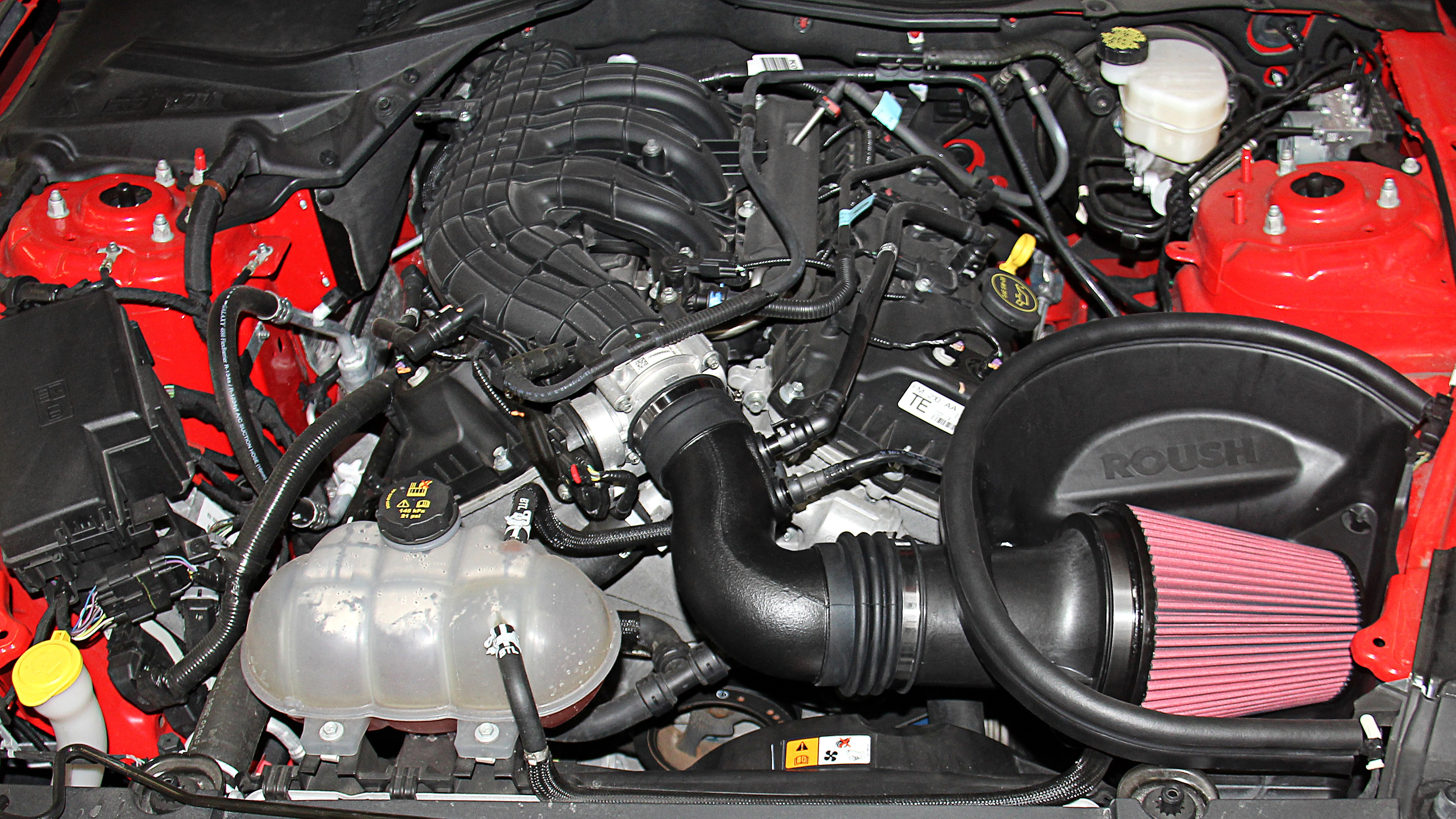
The 3.7-liter V6 with a Roush Performance cold air intake

For its launch for the 2015 model year, the Mustang offered three engine options: a 3.7-liter V6 for the V6 model (discontinued in 2017), a 2.3-liter inline-four for the EcoBoost model, and a 5.0-liter V8 for the GT model. (Note: This list does not include special or limited editions, such as the Mustang Bullitt or Shelby GT350; these are detailed in the subsequent sections.)

=== 3.7-liter V6 ===
The 3,726 cc (3.7 L; 227.4 cu in) V6, codenamed Cyclone, was the base engine in the Mustang lineup. It produces a power output of 305 horsepower (227 kW) at 6,500 revolutions per minute (rpm) and a torque output of 280 pound-feet (380 N⋅m) at 4,000 rpm, sufficient to give the car a zero to 60 mph (97 km/h) acceleration of 5.5 seconds and a maximum speed of 124 miles per hour (200 km/h). Compared to the 2014's 3.7-liter engine, the torque peak is 250 rpm lower, and maximum power has decreased by 5 horsepower (3.7 kW).

The Getrag-supplied MT82 six-speed manual transmission has updated low-drag synchronizers and a stiffer linkage for improved shift quality. Ford also redesigned the final drive, incorporating 9.8-inch differential internals within an 8.8-inch casing with a stronger ring, pinion, and housing. Manual-transmission models use an iron differential carrier to handle the high-impact loads of high-rpm shifts, while models with a six-speed automatic transmission models feature an aluminum carrier. Both manual and automatic versions include an aluminum differential cover, with the iron carrier weighing 11 kilograms (24 lb) more than the aluminum one. According to the United States Environmental Protection Agency (EPA), the V6 model has a fuel economy rating of 17 miles per US gallon (14 L/100 km; 20 mpg_{‑imp}) in the city and 28 miles per US gallon (8.4 L/100 km; 34 mpg_{‑imp}) on the highway. The V6 Mustang was discontinued in January 2017 as part of the 2018 model year refresh.

=== 2.3-liter I4 ===
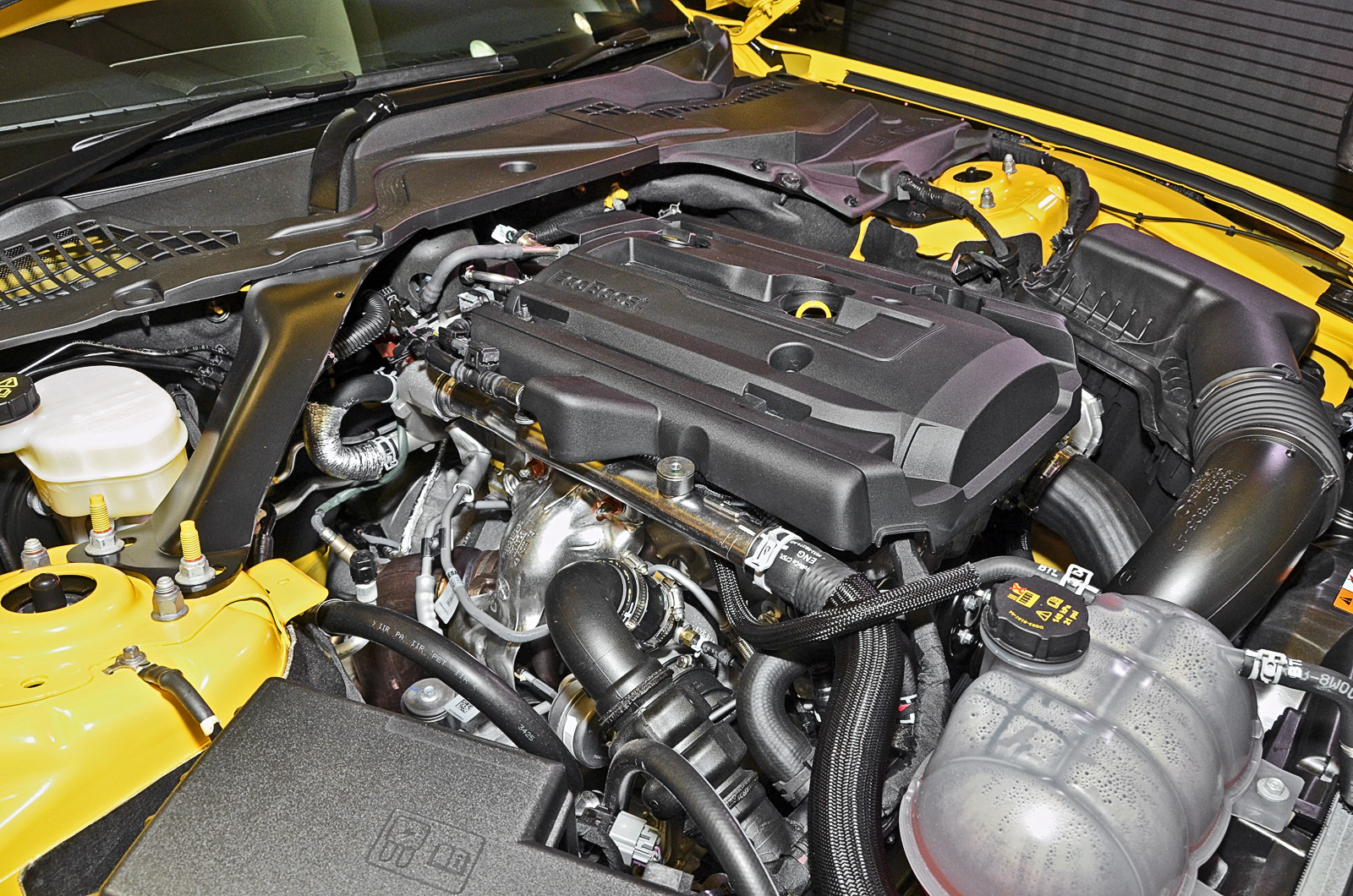
The 2.3-liter I4

Ford produced a model with a 2,253 cc (2.3 L; 137.5 cu in) EcoBoost engine. A turbocharged, intercooled, and straight-four engine, it produces 310 horsepower (230 kW) at 5,500 rpm and 320 pound-feet (430 N⋅m) at 2,500 rpm, with an acceleration from zero to 60 mph (97 km/h) in 5.6 seconds and a top speed of 148 miles per hour (238 km/h). It uses the same transmissions as the 3.7-liter V6, but the manual version is 2.3 kilograms (5.1 lb) heavier than the V6, while the automatic is 2.7 kilograms (6.0 lb) lighter. As per the standards of the EPA, the 2.3-liter Mustang has a fuel economy rating of 21 miles per US gallon (11 L/100 km; 25 mpg_{‑imp}) in the city and 32 miles per US gallon (7.4 L/100 km; 38 mpg_{‑imp}) on the highway.

The engine shares layout elements such as bore centers and deck height with other four-cylinder EcoBoost engines but is otherwise largely unique. While the Mustang's 2.3-liter engine resembles the 2.3 found in the Lincoln MKC and the Focus RS, it is installed longitudinally in the Mustang. In contrast, the MKC and Focus feature a transverse installation, requiring differences in components like the engine mounts and intake. The Mustang's EcoBoost engine spins its low-mass turbine to reduce lag and minimize efficiency and power loss from backflow into other cylinders. It also includes direct injection and variable valve timing.

For the 2018 model year facelift, the torque was increased to 350 pound-feet (470 N⋅m); its power output remained the same. A ten-speed 10R80 automatic transmission, co-developed with General Motors and funded by a US$1.4 billion investment in Ford's Livonia transmission plant, entered production in June 2016. This transmission was introduced in the Mustang as part of the 2018 facelift, replacing the previous six-speed model. The updated 2.3-liter Mustang maintained its fuel economy ratings of 21 miles per US gallon (11 L/100 km; 25 mpg_{‑imp}) and 32 miles per US gallon (7.4 L/100 km; 38 mpg_{‑imp}) in the city and on the highway, respectively. Between the model years 2020 and 2023, Ford produced a High Performance Package of the EcoBoost engine, increasing its power output to 330 horsepower (250 kW).

=== 5.0-liter V8 ===
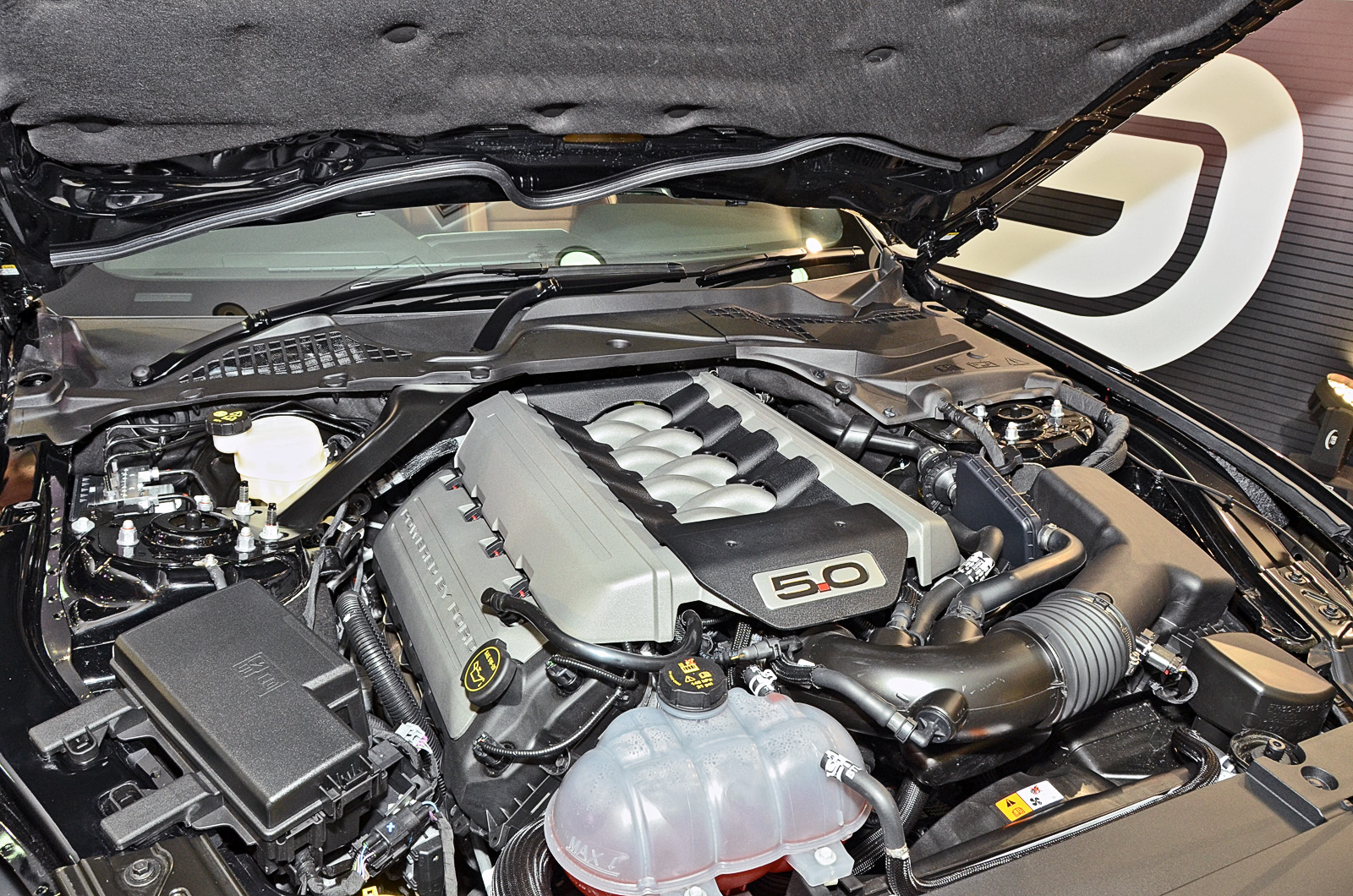
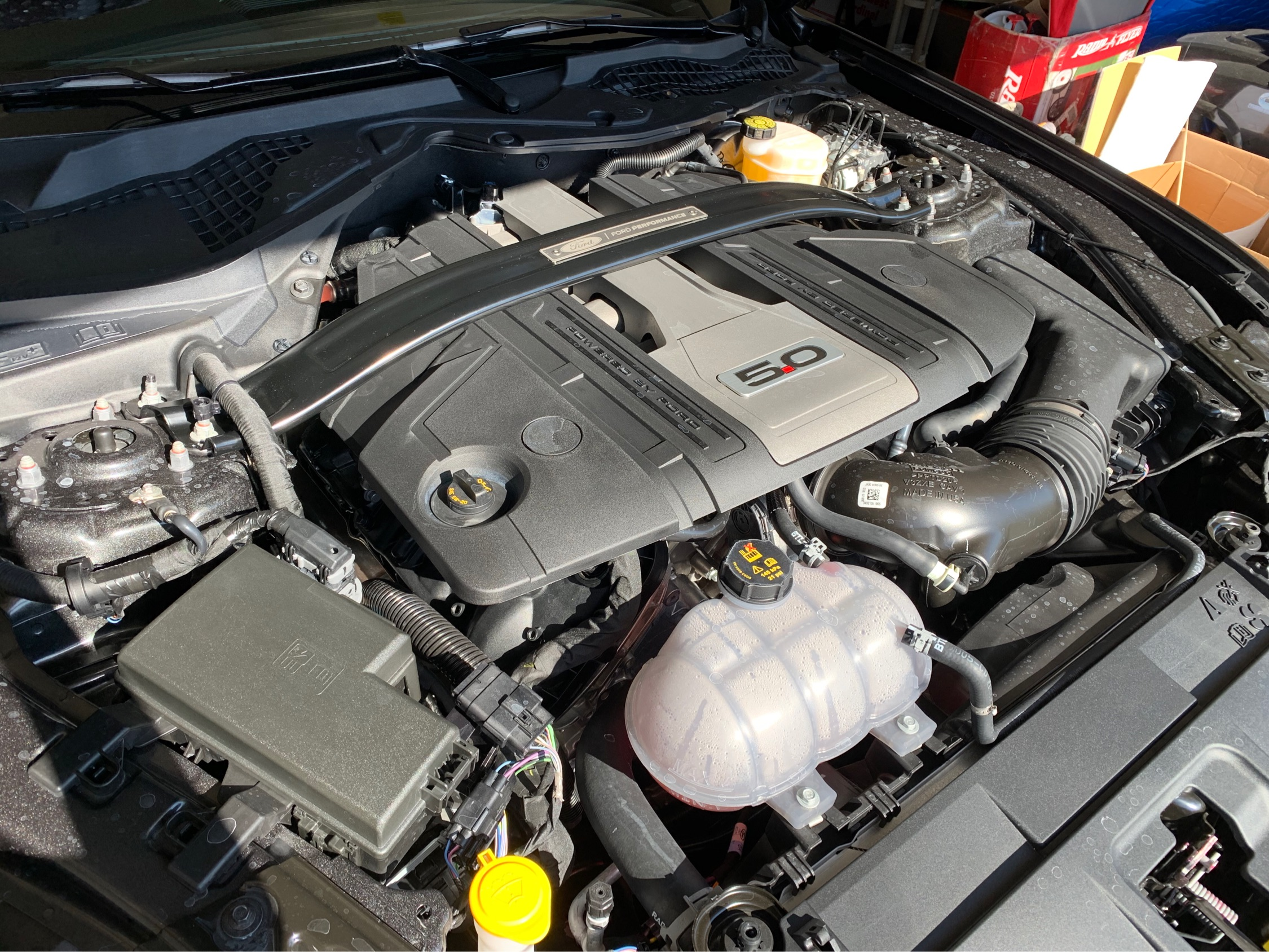
The 5.0-liter Coyote engine of the pre-facelift Mustang GT (left) and the facelift model (right)

The 4,951 cc (5.0 L; 302.1 cu in) Coyote V8 engine was designed for the GT model. The Mustang engineers set the 444-horsepower (331 kW) V8 from the low-volume Boss 302 Mustang as the performance benchmark. The Boss 302's engine included expensive manufacturing features, such as hollow intake valves and sodium-filled exhaust valves, which were impractical for mass production, leading Ford to explore other methods to reach similar power levels. The engine produces 435 horsepower (324 kW) at 6,500 rpm and 400 pound-feet (540 N⋅m) at 4,250 rpm—gains of 15 horsepower (11 kW) and 10 pound-feet (14 N⋅m) over the previous 5.0-liter. The Mustang GT accelerates from zero to 60 mph (97 km/h) in 4.6 seconds and has a maximum speed of 155 miles per hour (249 km/h). It was available with both a six-speed automatic and a six-speed manual. The Mustang GT has a fuel economy rating of 15 miles per US gallon (16 L/100 km; 18 mpg_{‑imp}) in the city and 25 miles per US gallon (9.4 L/100 km; 30 mpg_{‑imp}) on the highway.

For the 2018 model year update, the 5.0-liter V8 engine received updates that included larger valves and a dual injection system that incorporates both direct and port injection. Its engine displacement was increased to 5,038 cc (5.0 L; 307.4 cu in), while its power and torque outputs have been increased to 460 horsepower (340 kW) at 7,000 rpm and 420 pound-feet (570 N⋅m) at 4,250 rpm, respectively. The car's maximum speed remains the same, while its zero to 60 mph (97 km/h) acceleration has been reduced to 4.4 seconds. A 2022 model year update decreased its output to 450 horsepower (340 kW) at 7,000 rpm and 410 pound-feet (560 N⋅m) at 4,250 rpm. According to a Ford spokesperson, the changes were implemented to meet more stringent LEV III regulatory emissions requirements.

== 2018 facelift ==
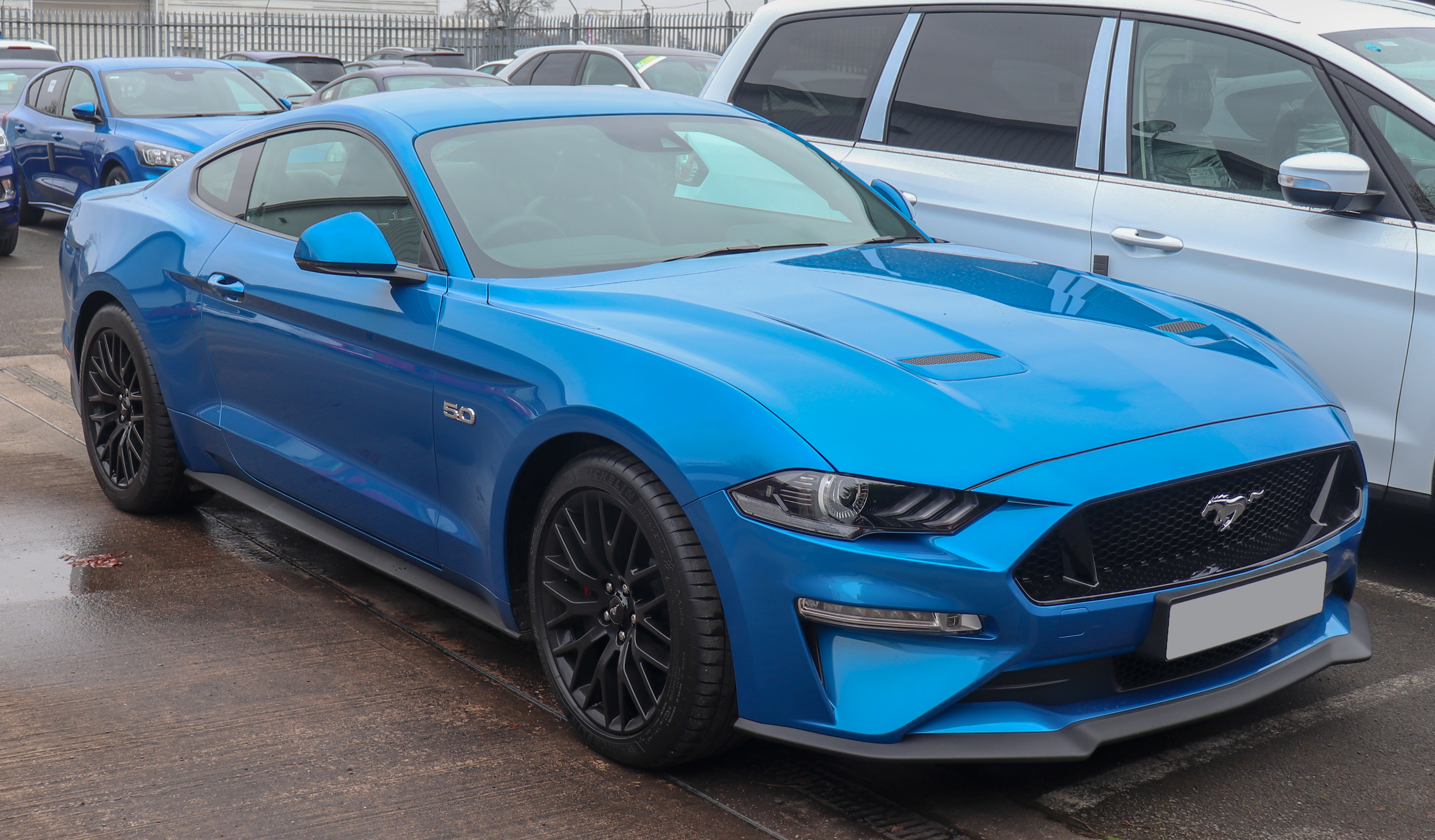
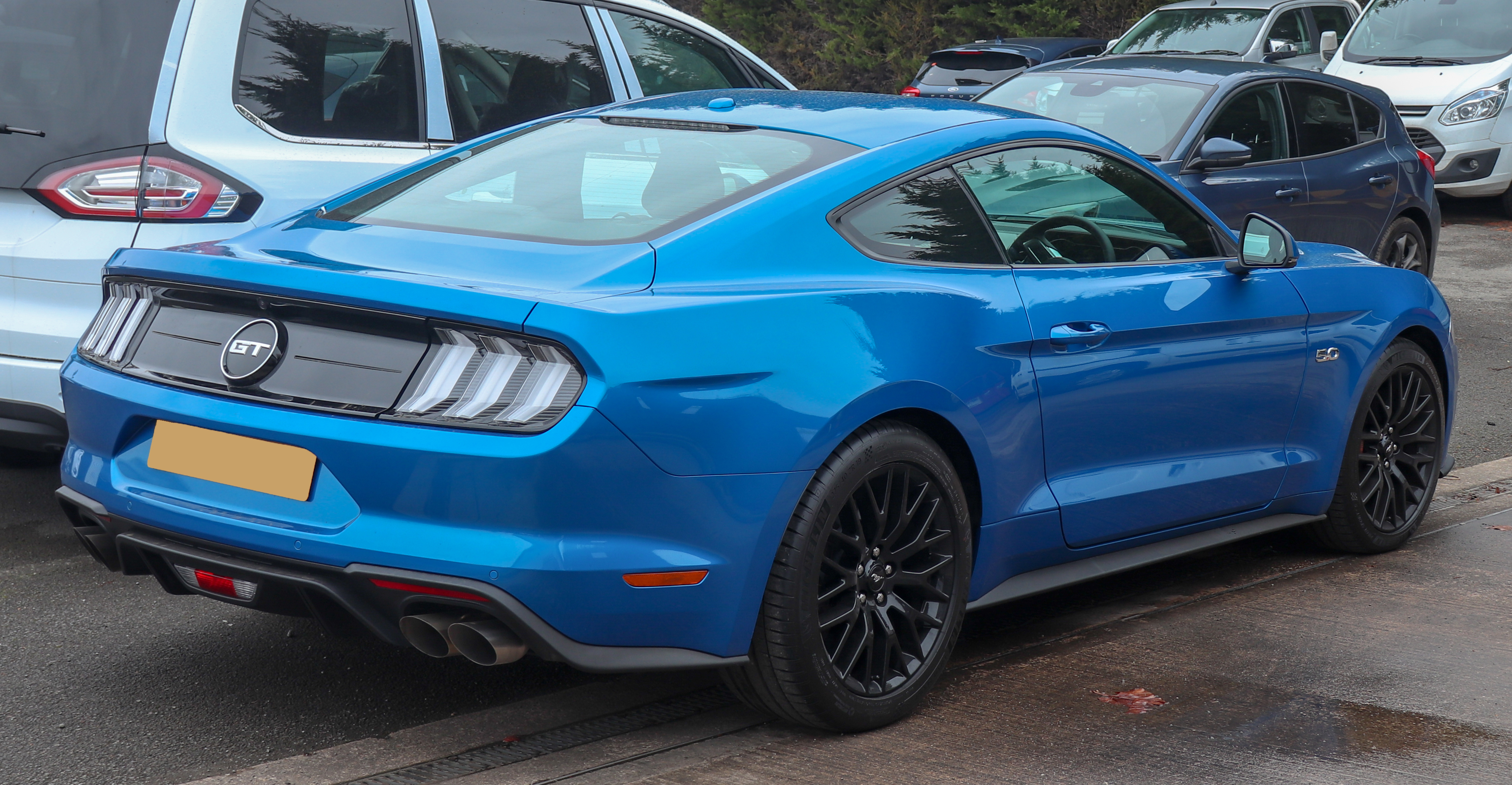
Front and rear view of the 2018 facelift

Ford unveiled the facelifted sixth generation of the Mustang on January 17, 2017, at a private event in New York City. Ford equipped the 2018 Mustang with redesigned headlight clusters, updated LED taillights and made LED lighting is now standard across all models, including the available LED fog lights. Ford lowered the Mustang's hood to enhance aerodynamics, which also resulted in thinner headlight clusters and a narrower grille. The 2018 model year Mustang offers MagneRide dampers as part of the optional Performance package, available with any engine. All updated Mustangs also come with new shock absorbers, a cross-axis joint in the rear suspension, and improved stabilizer bars.

The Active Valve Performance exhaust system was introduced, allowing drivers to adjust the Mustang's exhaust sound. A heated steering wheel was also made available, complementing the optional heated and ventilated front seats. The interior design remained familiar but features updates, including a revised instrument panel and added soft-touch surfaces on the center console. A twelve-inch digital dashboard was available, incorporating features like a quarter-mile timer and a lap timer. The pre-facelift's center display flanked by two analog gauges was replaced by a digital twelve-inch display capable of showing more information and customizable options, including font color, displayed data, and gauge type. The facelifted Mustang also includes an expanded suite of optional active safety features, including distance alert, lane departure warning, pedestrian detection, and the Pre-Collision Assist system, which combines forward collision warning with automatic emergency braking.

== Special editions ==
=== Shelby GT350 (2015–2020) ===
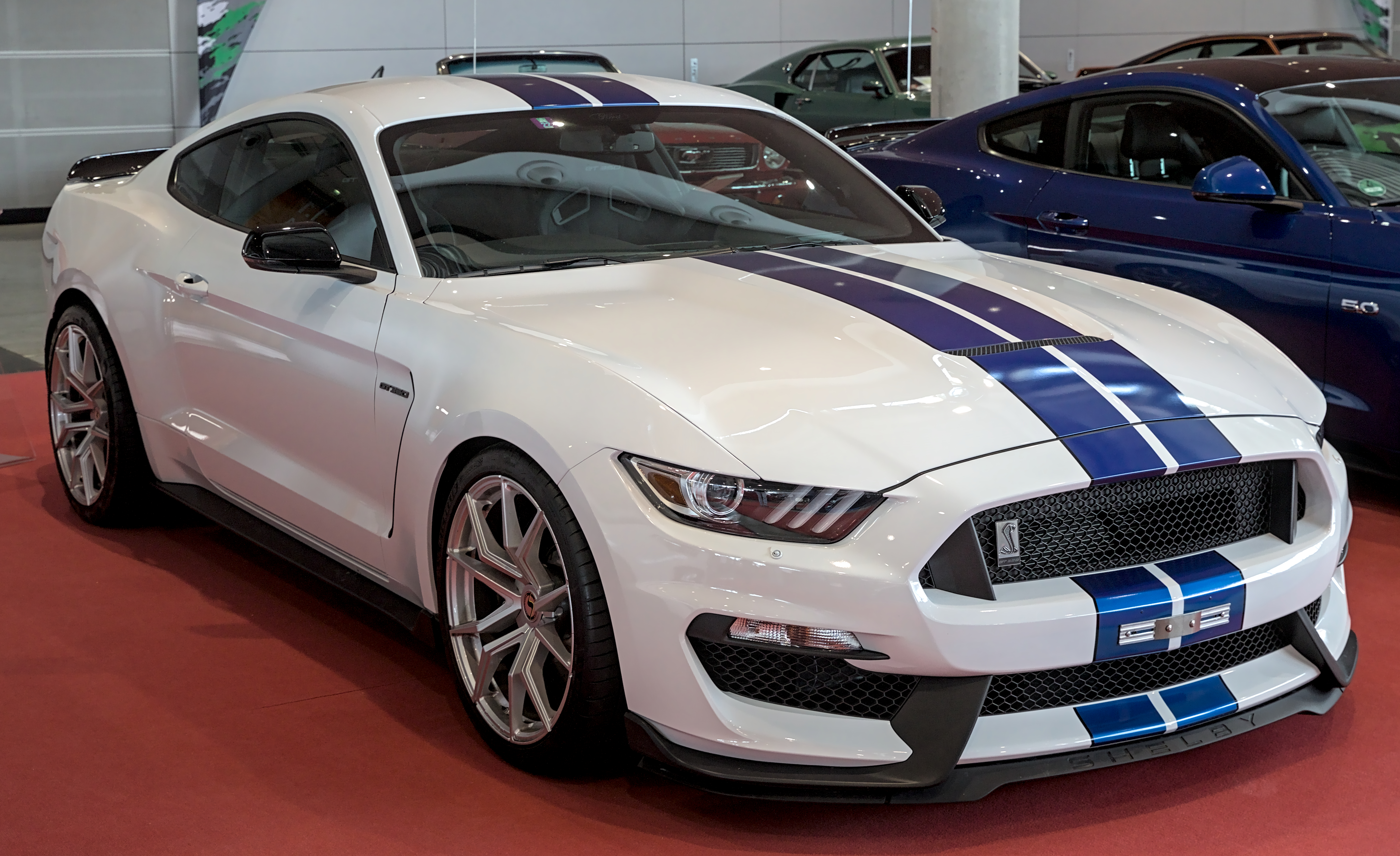
Shelby Mustang GT350

At the Los Angeles Auto Show in November 2014, Ford debuted the Shelby GT350 Mustang. A track day version of the Mustang, the GT350 Mustang features a 5,163 cc (5.2 L; 315.1 cu in) Voodoo flat-plane crank V8. The initial batch of GT350s were dedicated competition cars, but soon, street versions were introduced with additional comfort features. The engine produces 526 horsepower (392 kW) at 7,500 rpm and 429 pound-feet (582 N⋅m) at 4,750 rpm, sufficient to give it a zero to 60 mph (97 km/h) acceleration of 4.2 seconds and a maximum speed of 172 miles per hour (277 km/h). The Tremec TR-3160 manual transmission was adapted for sustained track use. Weight reductions were made to the unit, while the synchronizers use a specialized carbon-bronze construction. Suspension updates include aluminum knuckles and bearing assemblies, with rigid bushings for improved control and reinforced wheel bearings and anti-roll bars. The car comes with 19-inch aluminum wheels, while the GT350R version includes carbon fiber wheels. These wheels—the first from a mass-market automaker—weigh 18 pounds (8.2 kg).

The Shelby GT350 Mustang is 20 percent stiffer than the Mustang GT. Everything forward of the A-pillar is newly designed, with a lower hood profile. The injection-molded carbon fiber grille enhances front chassis stiffness and is 24 percent lighter than the standard Mustang grille. To reduce weight, the rear seats were removed, the windows were replaced with plexiglass, and the hood and front bumper were constructed from fiberglass. The engine features variable valve timing, known as Ti-VCT. Additional options include larger alloy wheels, a navigation system, rear backup sensors, a rear backup camera, blind spot monitoring, and premium leather Recaro seating surfaces. Manufacture of the GT350 ended in October 2020 in favor of the Shelby GT500.

=== Bullitt (2019–2020) ===
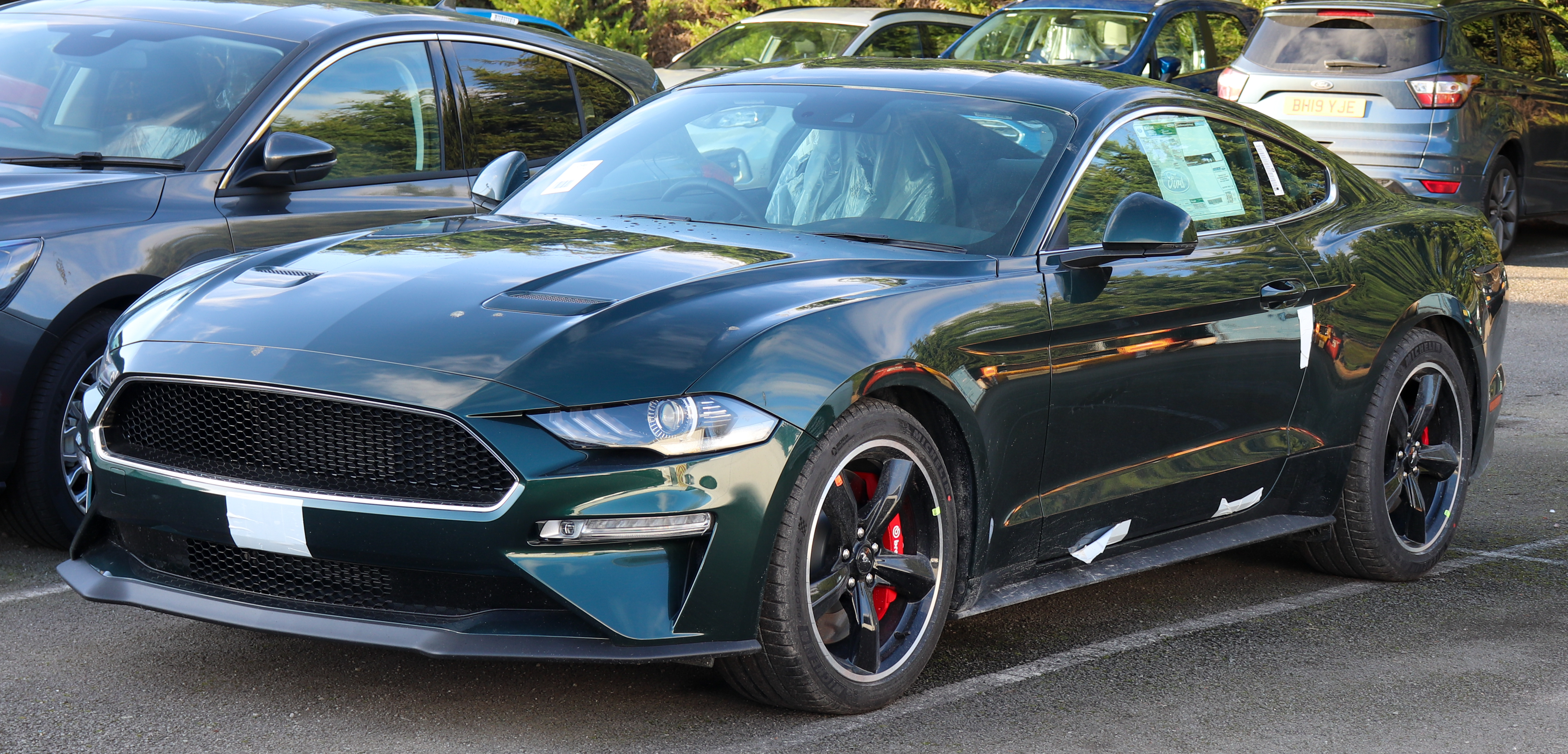
2020 Mustang Bullitt

Conceived to commemorate the fiftieth anniversary of the 1968 film Bullitt, Ford debuted the Mustang Bullitt at the North American International Auto Show in January 2018 as a 2019 model year vehicle. The third incarnation of the Mustang Bullitt, the car has a modified version of the GT's 5,038 cc (5.0 L; 307.4 cu in) Coyote V8 engine. It generates 480 horsepower (360 kW) at 7,000 rpm and 420 pound-feet (570 N⋅m) at 4,600 rpm, allowing the car to accelerate from 0 to 60 mph (97 km/h) in 4.4 seconds and a giving it a top speed of 163 miles per hour (262 km/h).

The Mustang Bullitt was offered in Dark Highland Green (deep green) like the original 1968 model, as well as in Shadow Black; additionally, a single unit was produced in Kona Blue (dark blue). The car includes a six-speed manual transmission supplied by Getrag. The styling is inspired directly by the 1968 GT390 featured in Bullitt, featuring a chrome-trimmed, blacked-out grille without the Mustang emblem and 19-inch five-spoke wheels. The only model-specific exterior badge is the large round Bullitt emblem between the taillights—absent on the original movie car.

=== Shelby GT500 (2020–2022) ===
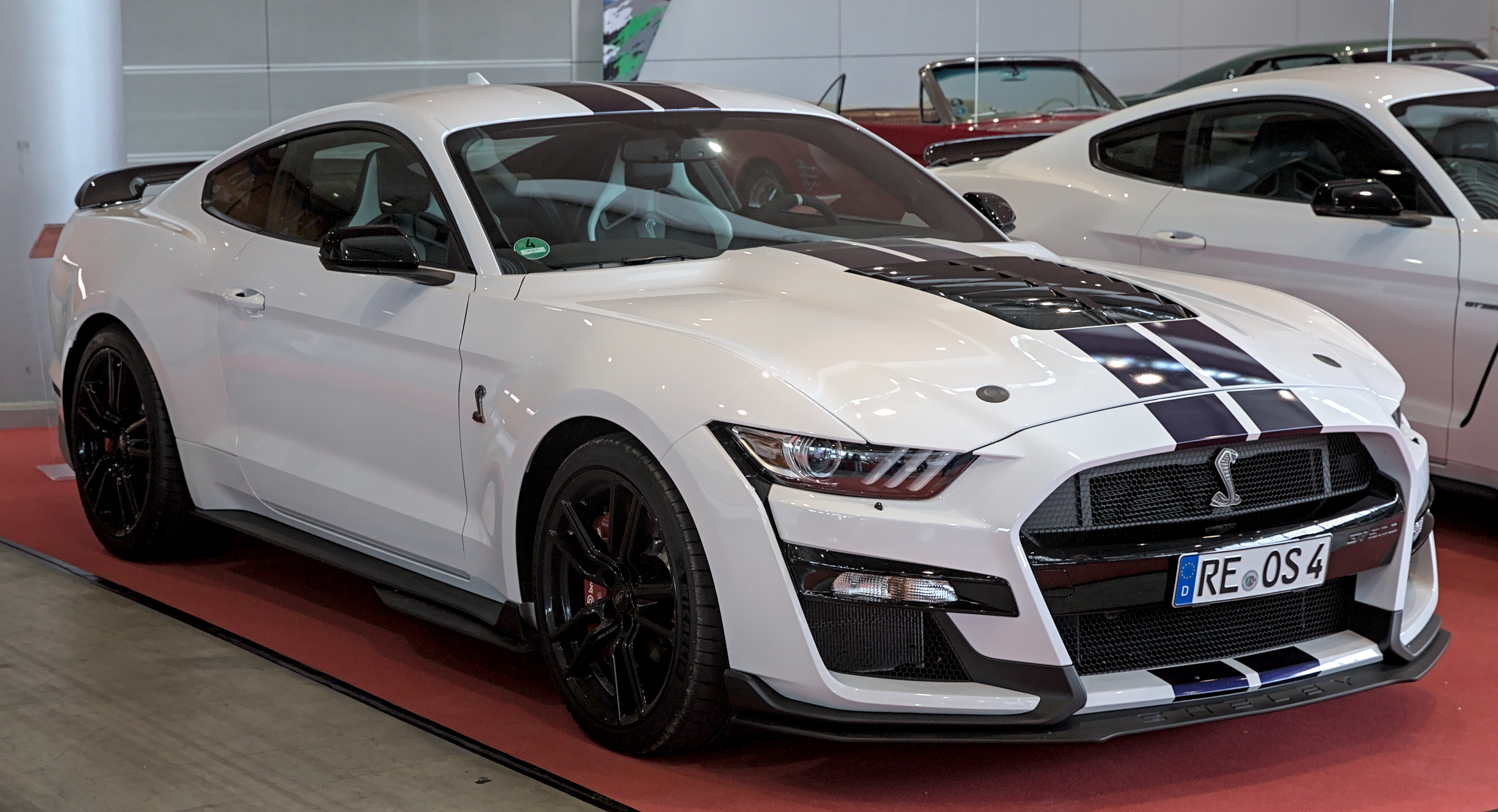
Shelby Mustang GT500

Ford unveiled the Shelby Mustang GT500, the successor to the GT350, at the North American International Auto Show in January 2019 for the 2020 model year. The car is powered by a 5,163 cc (5.2 L; 315.1 cu in) Predator cross-plane crank V8 with a 2.65-liter Roots-type supercharger by Eaton. It generates 760 horsepower (570 kW) at 7,300 rpm and 625 pound-feet (847 N⋅m) at 5,000 rpm, giving the car a zero to 60 mph (97 km/h) acceleration time of 3.3 seconds and a maximum speed of 180 miles per hour (290 km/h).

The GT500 incorporates Tremec's TR-9070 seven-speed dual-clutch gearbox, capable of shifts in as little as eighty milliseconds. The GT500's scoops and vents are larger to meet the increased cooling demands of its more powerful engine and transmission, as well as its enlarged brakes, which now feature 16.5-inch (420 mm) front rotors for improved heat dissipation. Ford stated the front design has double the open area of the GT350, allowing 50 percent more cooling airflow. The Shelby GT500 was, at the time of its release, the most powerful Mustang. The Carbon Fiber Track Pack, which includes 20-inch carbon-fiber wheels, aerodynamic enhancements, and Michelin Pilot Sport Cup 2 tires.

The Shelby Mustang's interior closely resembles that of the standard model, sharing design elements and similar passenger and cargo space. However, the GT500 was available with a carbon-fiber instrument panel trim and Recaro front seats. Its standard features included customizable 12.0-inch digital gauge cluster, dual-zone climate control, leather-trimmed heated and cooled front seats, and a six-way power driver's seat. The standard aluminum dashboard trim can be upgraded to exposed carbon fiber, and rear seats can be deleted to reduce weight. Ford ended production of the GT500 in 2022.

=== Mach 1 (2021–2023) ===
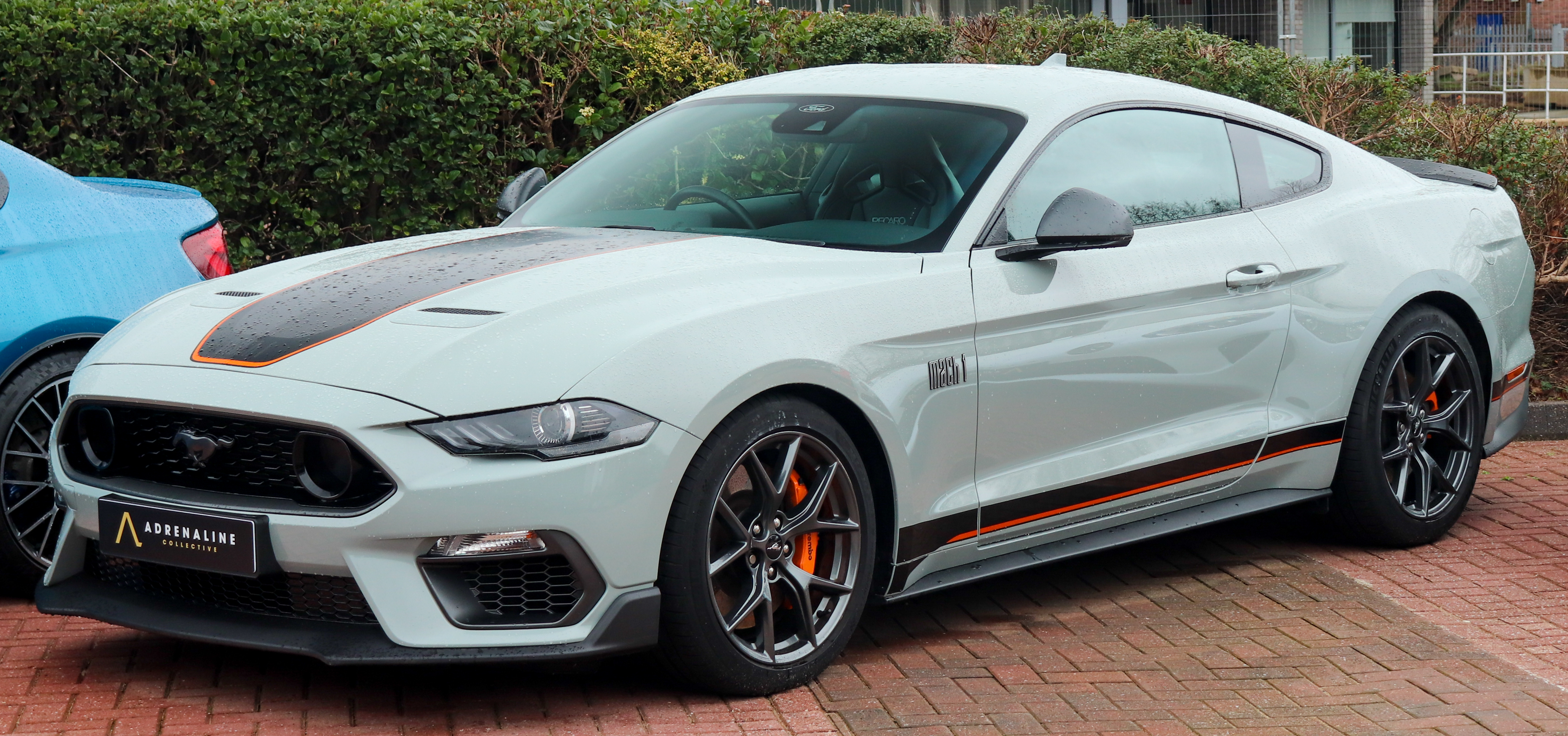
2021 Mustang Mach 1

Ford revealed the Mach 1 on June 16, 2020, via the Internet, as a 2021 model year vehicle. The engine, a 5.0-liter Coyote V8 derived from the GT, generates 480 horsepower (360 kW) at 7,000 rpm and 420 pound-feet (570 N⋅m) at 4,600 rpm. It is able to accelerate from zero to 60 mph (97 km/h) in 4.3 seconds and has a maximum speed of 168 miles per hour (270 km/h). For the 2022 model year, the car's power output was decreased to 470 horsepower (350 kW) while its torque output was decreased to 410 pound-feet (560 N⋅m).

The model incorporates several components from the Shelby line: the intake manifold, oil-filter adapter, engine oil cooler, and front and rear subframes are shared with the Shelby GT350, while the rear axle cooling system, rear toe link, and rear diffuser derive from the Shelby GT500. The front grille features two large vent openings on either side of the mustang badge. It came standard with the Shelby GT350's six-speed manual transmission, with an optional 10-speed automatic featuring paddle shifters. The Mach 1 was discontinued in 2023.

== Limited editions ==
=== Mustang 50 Year Limited Edition (2015) ===
A total of 1,964 units of a version of the 2015 Ford Mustang GT Coupé with the performance pack and either a manual or automatic transmission, were made to commemorate the 50th anniversary of the Ford Mustang vehicle lineup. Changes included a choice of two special edition body colors based on 1964 model year colors (Wimbledon White and Kona Blue), louvered rear quarter-windows with layered sheets of glass, cashmere-stitched leather-wrapped steering wheel, cashmere-stitching in instrument panel, shifter boot, center armrest, door inserts and seats; exclusive two-tone cashmere and black leather upholstery, Mustang 50 Year logo on the seat backs, loop-carpet floor mats with cashmere stitching and suede binding, 19-inch (9.0/9.5-inch front/rear) alloy wheels with unique Y-spoke design, 255/40R front tires, 275/40R rear tires.

The vehicle was unveiled at the 2014 New York International Auto Show and the vehicle went on sale in September 2014.

This model will be marketed as a 2014 1/2 model, paying tribute to the original 1964 1/2 model. Wimbledon White and Kona Blue will no longer be available exterior colors on the Mustang after the 50 Year Limited Edition's discontinuation when the model sells out.

A "one of one" convertible version of the 50 Year Limited Edition Mustang was raffled off for charity on the "Woodward Dream Cruise" on August 16, 2014, with the proceeds benefitting the National Multiple Sclerosis Society.

The 50 Years Appearance Package will continue to be available on the EcoBoost Premium and GT Premium Fastback and Convertible models after the 50 Year Limited Edition sells out. It will add nineteen-inch chrome-finished alloy wheels, the "stable"-style front grille, the "Running Horse" front fender badges, a unique "Raven" interior color scheme, and more.

A 50-Year Limited Edition 2015 Ford Mustang served as the pace car for the NASCAR Sprint Cup and Nationwide Series races during Ford Championship Weekend at Homestead-Miami Speedway, November 14–16, 2014.

=== Shelby American GT (2015–2016) ===
There was an optional hood extension, mirror cap, tail light panel, and convertible light bar available. The car may be ordered with all the factory paint colors, plus the option of racing stripes in 5 different colors. Other visual hues include special Shelby badging and 20" WELD Racing Wheels available in 3 different colors and upper and lower grilles with Shelby GT badging in 2 different colors. The interior of the car gets a Shelby GT dash plaque as well as embroidered headrests and floor mats. A Katzkin interior was also available as an option as well as Shelby valve covers, and an engine cap kit.

Performance wise, the Shelby GT was outfitted with a cold air intake that comes standard with the car good for a small increase in horsepower. Also standard was the Ford Performance handling pack, short throw shifter, and exhaust with Shelby tips. Performance options include a Ford Performance Supercharger good for 670 hp (500 kW), half shafts, differential and transmission cooling, Wilwood brakes (6 piston in the front, 4 piston in the rear), brake duct kit, camber/caster plates, adjustable rear control arms, 3:73 rear gears, a carbon fiber dash mounted 3-gauge pod to track boost, fuel, and oil pressure, race seats, roll cage, and a harness.

The car can be customized in coupe or convertible forms, as well as in GT or EcoBoost versions.

=== Shelby GT350R (2015–2020) ===
A further enhanced and even more limited edition of the GT350 with an "R" package (GT350R) was introduced by Ford in 2015, with only 37 units being made. The first Shelby GT350R with #001 sold for $1 million at a Barrett Jackson Auction in Scottsdale, Arizona.

Significant engineering innovations result in weight savings, aerodynamic improvements to benefit on-track performance; Ford introduced carbon fiber wheels as standard equipment on the Shelby GT350R Mustang. Items removed include air conditioning, the stereo system, rear seats, trunk floorboard and carpet, backup camera, and emergency tire sealant and inflation kit. Exhaust resonators were also removed for weight savings with the benefit of creating a sharper exhaust tone.

The Shelby GT350R was more than 130 lb (59 kg) lighter than the Shelby GT350 Track Pack model, which has proven its durability in multiple 24-hour racetrack tests. The GT350R also comes with carbon fiber wheels, supplied by Australian manufacturer Carbon Revolution, which weigh only 18 lb (8 kg) each compared to similarly specified aluminum wheels which typically weigh 33 lb (15 kg) each.

Aside from carbon fiber wheels, larger front splitter and rear wing, Shelby GT350R features distinct design details. Exterior touches include red painted brake calipers, red pin striping at the edges of the optional over-the-top racing stripes and Shelby GT350R badging. Inside is high-contrast red stitching, Shelby GT350R badging and the D-shaped steering wheel fitted with a red center mark at the top.

One optional feature for the GT350R was the GT350R Technology Package, which adds the Ford SYNC 3 multimedia infotainment system, seven speakers, a rear backup camera system, SIRIUS-XM Satellite Radio, and air conditioning. The package is helpful for GT350R buyers who plan to use their car for more than track purposes or for show. Parts of this package, namely the infotainment system and backup camera, were made standard during April 2018 production, due to U.S. legislation requiring all new vehicles sold in the U.S. to have backup cameras.

== Concepts and prototypes ==
=== Warszawa M20 GT (2018) ===
At the 2018 Economic Forum in Krynica, Polish company KHM Motor unveiled the Warszawa M20 GT, a sports car designed as a modern tribute to the classic FSO Warszawa. Essentially a rebodied Mustang GT, the M20 GT featured the Mustangs 420 bhp, 5.0-liter V8 engine, alongside various components from the Chevrolet Camaro and tail lights from the Mercedes-AMG GT. KHM Motor falsely claimed that the project was officially approved by Ford, who would allegedly supply the company with the necessary parts for manufacture. Following widespread coverage in Polish media, Ford later denied any involvement in the project, stating that KHMs claims and use of the Ford logotype on their website were "groundless and unlawful". Despite aspirations of up to 30 cars to be produced per year, the Warszawa M20 GT remained a one-off.

=== Mustang Cobra Jet 1400 (2020) ===
Unveiled by Ford Performance, the Mustang Cobra Jet 1400 was an electric dragster prototype. The V8 engine was replaced with high-output electric motors. As a result, as the name suggests, the factory-made prototype generates close to 1,400 hp (1,044 kW; 1,419 PS) and 1,491 N⋅m (1,100 lb⋅ft) of torque. The electric prototype was a homage to the first Cobra Jet that was heavily tested on drag strips. Mark Rushbrook, the CEO of Ford Performance Motorsports, says that the Cobra Jet 1400 was an opportunity to develop electric powertrains on an existing, popular sports car. The developers for the Mustang Cobra Jet 1400 include MLe Racecars, Watson Engineering, AEM EV, and Cascadia.

== Aftermarket versions ==
=== Shelby GT500 Signature Edition (GT500 SE) (2020–2022) ===
Special edition of the standard GT500 only sold by Shelby as a post title upgrade. It includes 800+ hp, lowered and tuned suspension and a 13.6 kg (30 lb) weight reduction via an ultra-light, vented dry carbon fiber hood. Shelby limits production to 100 cars per model year. 2022 MY vehicles receive 60th Anniversary Shelby Badging.

=== Shelby GT500 King of the Road (GT500 KR) (2020–2022) ===
Special edition of the GT500 is sold by Shelby American in Las Vegas as a post title upgrade. It features a larger supercharger pushing more than 900 horsepower, a vented dry carbon fiber hood, one-piece forged mono-block wheels, Borla exhaust, improved suspension and a reworked interior. Shelby limits production to 60 cars per model year. 2022 MY vehicles receive 60th Anniversary Shelby Badging.

=== Shelby GT500 Code Red (2020–2022) ===
The first experimental car from Shelby which found its way to production. The car has a high-performance 5.2 L V8 boosted by a twin-turbo system, which contributes to a final output of over 1000 HP with 93-octane fuel and up to 1300 HP while running on ethanol. Shelby will produce 10 cars per model year. 2022 MY vehicles receive 60th Anniversary Shelby Badging.

=== F-35 Lightning II (2015) ===
On July 31, 2014, a special 2015 Mustang was auctioned off at the Experimental Aircraft Association (EAA) AirVenture air show in Oshkosh, Wisconsin, with proceeds going to benefit the EAA's Young Eagles program.

The F-35 Lightning II Mustang was named after the then new F-35 Lightning II fighter jet. Based on a 2015 Mustang GT fastback, this one-off model was one of the first sixth generation Mustangs to be sold. The exterior features glossy and matte dark-silver paint along with yellow hood stripes, mirror caps, and brake calipers. Blue and yellow rear-end graphics mimic the tail livery of early-production examples of the F35 fighter jet, as does the gold tint on its windows. The car sits on lowered Eibach springs and custom black and yellow Forgiato 21-inch wheels, while the exhaust system was modified with larger, ceramic-coated cans. The F-35 Lightning II Mustang also features a custom aero kit with carbon-fiber components including a front splitter, sill extensions, a rear diffuser, and a stand-up rear spoiler. The final exterior touches come in the form of an F-35 badge on the rear panel, and the flags of nine U.S. allies on the lower doors. The interior of the car features mix of black and yellow parts, with additions including Recaro racing seats, a modified instrument cluster, custom audio system, and sill plates, as well as F-35 Lightning II embroidery on the floor mats, door panels, and seatbacks. The car comes with a 6-speed manual transmission.

=== Galpin Fisker Rocket (2015) ===
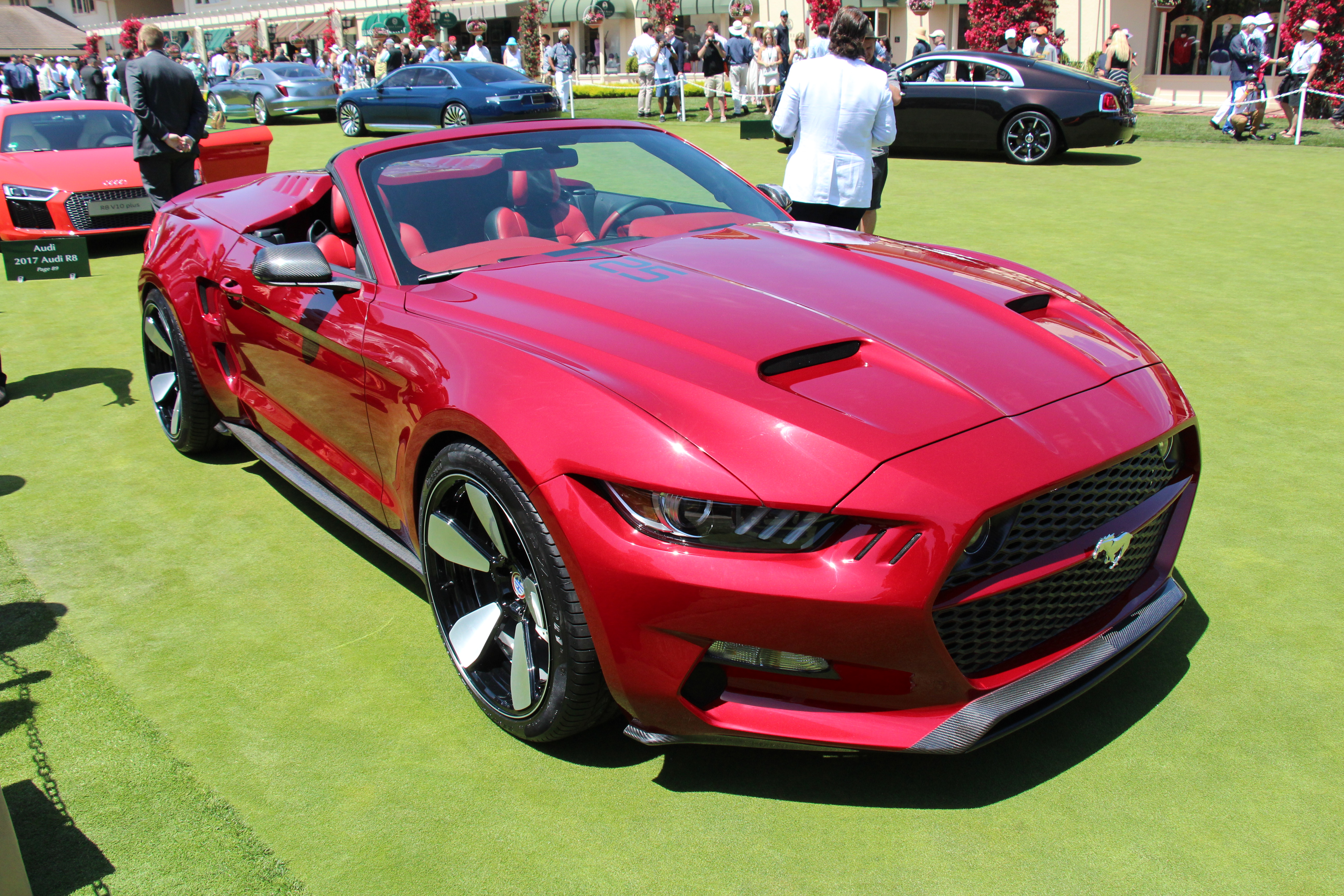
Mustang Rocket convertible concept

Unveiled at the 2014 Los Angeles Auto Show, the Rocket was a variety of the Mustang modified by Henrik Fisker, a Danish automobile designer. The car featured revised carbon fibre body panels with a tuned version of the 5.2-liter V8 engine, said to produce around 720 bhp. The styling of the car was inspired by Shelby's and muscle cars of the 1960s and 70s, notably the 1965 Shelby GT500. Prices began at $109,100.

=== Roush RS Models (2015–2017) ===
The Roush RS models are upgrade packages from Roush Performance for the Mustang. For 2015, the standard components of each RS model include new front and rear fascias, new grille, driving lamps, side-sill extensions, a rear spoiler, embroidered floor mats. Stage 1 vehicles also have a performance exhaust system, while Stage 2 cars get all of the above plus a set of five-spoke 20-inch “Quicksilver” wheels and Cooper RS3 performance tires. (The rolling stock was available as an upgrade on the other two models.) Optional on all are a hood scoop, window scoops, billet pedals, a ball shifter, Roush gauges and door sill plates. Stage 1 and Stage 2 models can also be upgraded with a reverse-sensing system and active exhaust.

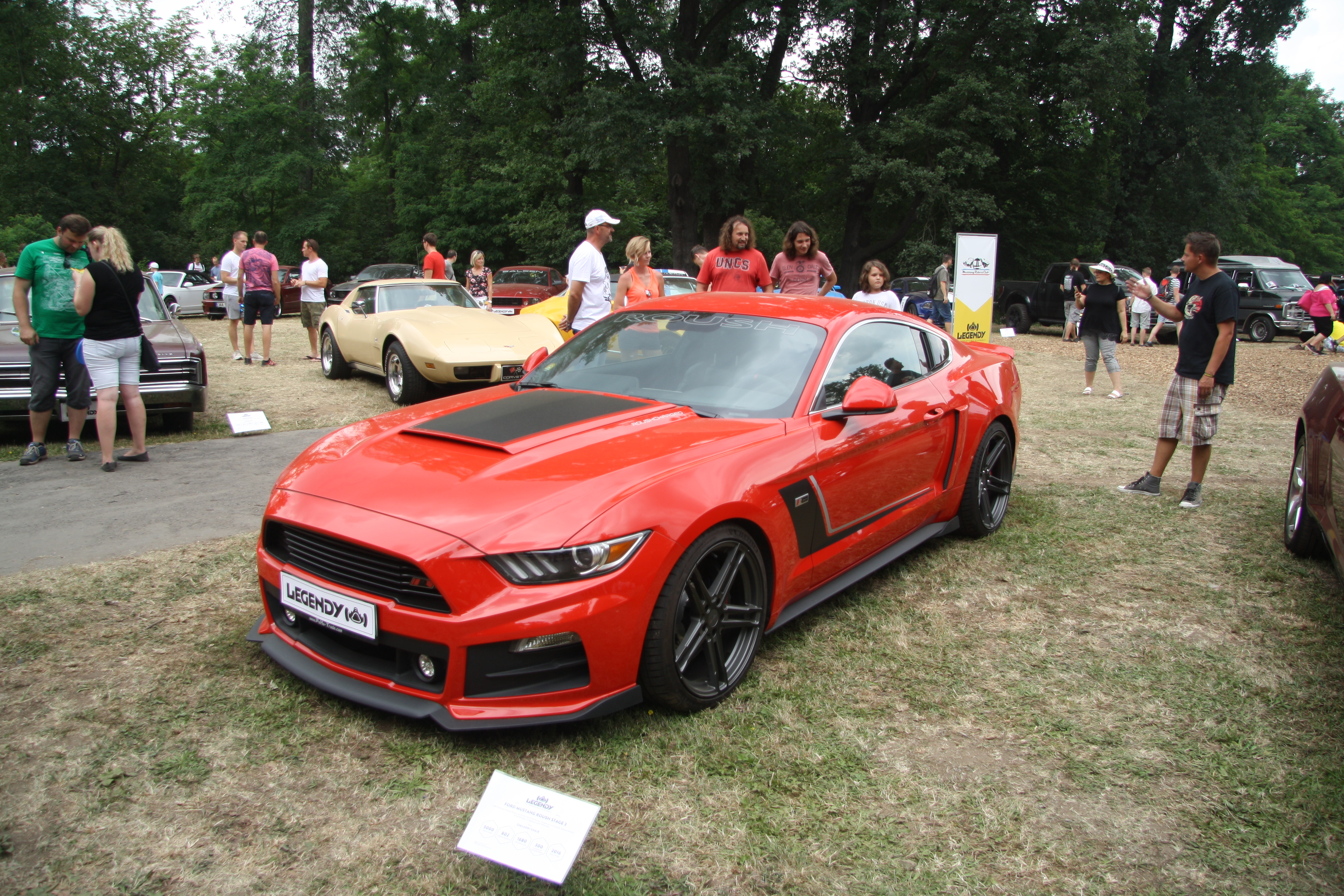
2015-2017 Roush RS3

For 2016, the basic RS model carries over unchanged. The Stage 1 setup now supports the 4 cylinder EcoBoost. Stage 2 also carries over. Completely new for 2016 was the Roush Stage 3. The 2016 Roush Stage 3 Mustang was the most powerful production Mustang offered by the Roush Performance garage at 670 hp (500 kW) or an optional 730 hp (544 kW). The 670 hp (500 kW) version still keeps the Ford and Roush 3 year / 36,000 mile warranty, but the 730 hp (544 kW) version does not. Standard features include a Roush Quad-Tip exhaust (with the ROUSH Active Exhaust System as an optional add-on), and the “R7” aerobody, complete with graphics and badging. The RS3 comes equipped with a standard single adjustable coilover suspension system, with an optional competition-tuned 3-way adjustable system available.

=== Saleen S302 Models (2015–2016) ===
Saleen has introduced three different models for the sixth-generation Mustang.

The "White Label S302" includes a naturally aspirated 450 hp 302ci 5.0 L V8 engine. A manual transmission was standard but an automatic was offered as an option. This model contains the Saleen S302 styling package for advanced aerodynamics. The White Label was available in 23 different colors, with 2 different wheel size options: standard 20" 5 spoke, or an optional 19" 7 spoke. Both wheels are available in standard Silver/Chrome, Carbonite, or Brushed Aluminum finish. To make this model Saleen specific, there was a Saleen logo deck lid insert and model specific badging. Other upgrades include a spoiler known as the "Saleen high downforce wing" and a Saleen exhaust system. The White Label can be configured in either a coupe or convertible version. Each vehicle was given its own VIN and was catalogued throughout the manufacturing process, giving it authentic collectability and higher resale values.

For the "Yellow Label S302" model, all of the amenities listed above are included, but with an eighth generation Saleen Supercharger good for 715 hp under the hood.

The "Black Label S302" comes standard with a 450 hp 302ci 5.0 L V8 engine, but can be optioned with a supercharger and Powerflash calibration to make 730 hp (544 kW). Wheel and color options are the same as the White and Yellow labels. The Saleen exhaust system also carries over from the White and Yellow labels. Other performance modifications include a standard S4 suspension package or an optional fully adjustable suspension setup and 13.9" vented 4-piston brakes which come standard, or 15" slotted 6-piston brakes, which are optional. The Black Label also features a body kit, including a completely redesigned front fascia, axial grille, hood, side skirts, wing, and rear diffuser.

=== Warrior Edition (2015–2016) ===
In 2015, Roush Motorsport teamed up with Military Auto Sales to build vehicles specifically for military members stationed overseas, or currently deployed. The result was a numbered and limited run of 15 stage 3, GT-based 627 hp (468 kW) supercharged fastbacks, and 30 EcoBoost-based 320 hp (239 kW) fastbacks. They were only available in Race Red or Midnight Black, with the opposite color on their side stripes and decals. Most came with a 6-speed manual transmission.

For 2016, a second run of 45 were offered for sale. All were 670 hp (500 kW), with a 6-speed manual. They were split evenly between Shadow Black, Race Red, and Deep Impact Blue.

== Safety ==
=== Euro NCAP ===
Euro NCAP tested a LHD (Left Hand Drive), European version of the 2-door coupe variant on a 2017 registration and earned 2 stars out of 5. The refreshed 2018 Mustang was reassessed in July 2017 after the introduction of collision avoidance systems. The score was upgraded to 3 stars out of 5.

Euro NCAP test results Ford Mustang (2017)
Test	Points	%
Overall:	2 /5 stars	
Adult occupant:	27.7	72%
Child occupant:	15.8	32%
Pedestrian:	27	64%
Safety assist:	2	16%

Euro NCAP test results Ford Mustang (reassessed) (2017)
Test	Points	%
Overall:	3 /5 stars	
Adult occupant:	27.7	72%
Child occupant:	15.8	32%
Pedestrian:	32.8	78%
Safety assist:	7.4	61%

=== IIHS ===
The 2023 Mustang was safety tested by the IIHS:

IIHS 2023 Ford Mustang scores
Small overlap front, driver-side	Acceptable
Moderate overlap front	Good
Side	Good
Roof strength	Good
Head restraints and seats	Good
Child seat anchors (LATCH) ease of use	Marginal

=== NHTSA ===
In February 2015, the Mustang earned a 5-star rating from the National Highway Traffic Safety Administration (NHTSA) for front, side, and rollover crash protection.

== Marketing ==
As part of the Mustang's 50th anniversary celebration, Ford engineers cut a Mustang convertible into small sections and reassembled it on the 86th floor observation deck of the Empire State Building in New York City.

Ford has also implemented the In a Mustang tagline, which also features short films featuring the 2015 Ford Mustang. Such films are uploaded to YouTube on the Ford Mustang Channel.

Ford worked with Lego to create a special Lego Speed Champion version of the Mustang GT. It was unveiled at the North American International Auto Show as a promotion of the Ford Mustang. Lego and Ford gave away the models for free to children who came to show. A few months later, the model could be purchased at toy stores.

Hot Wheels have released multiple iterations of the Ford Mustang over the years, appealing to diecast collectors worldwide.

== Motorsport ==
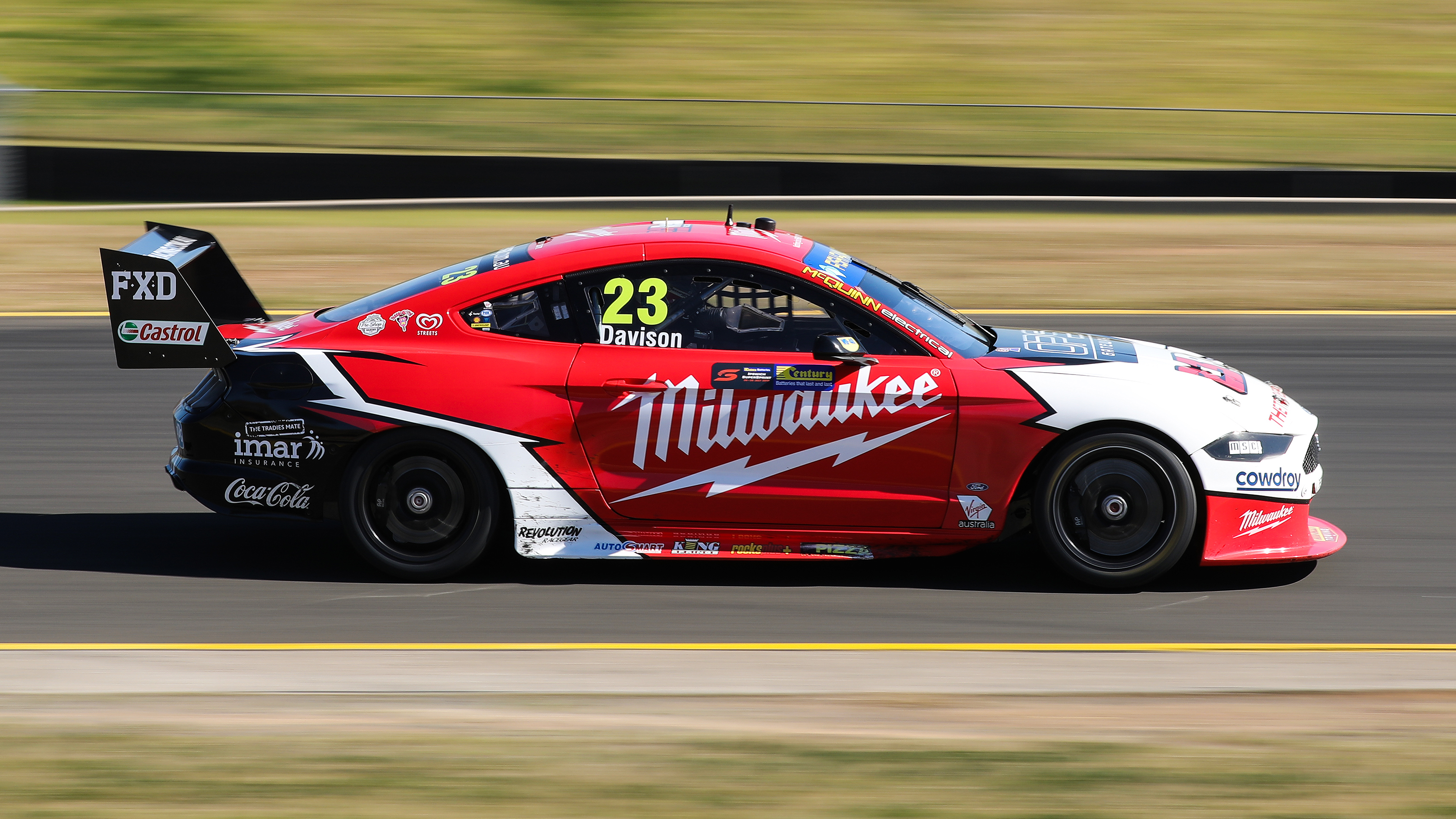
The Mustang was used by Ford teams in the Supercars Championship until 2023.

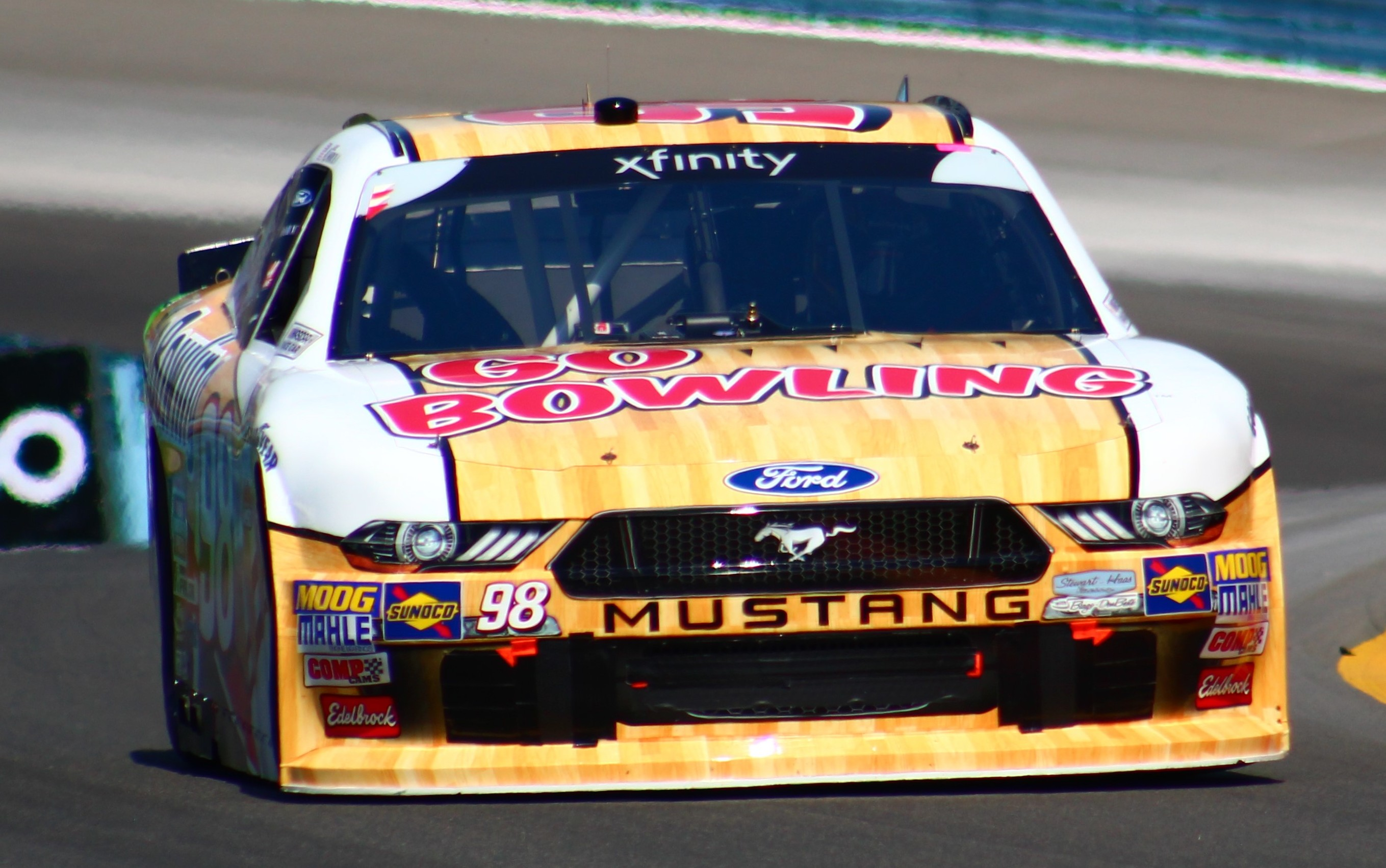
The Mustang has been run in the NASCAR Xfinity Series for many years.

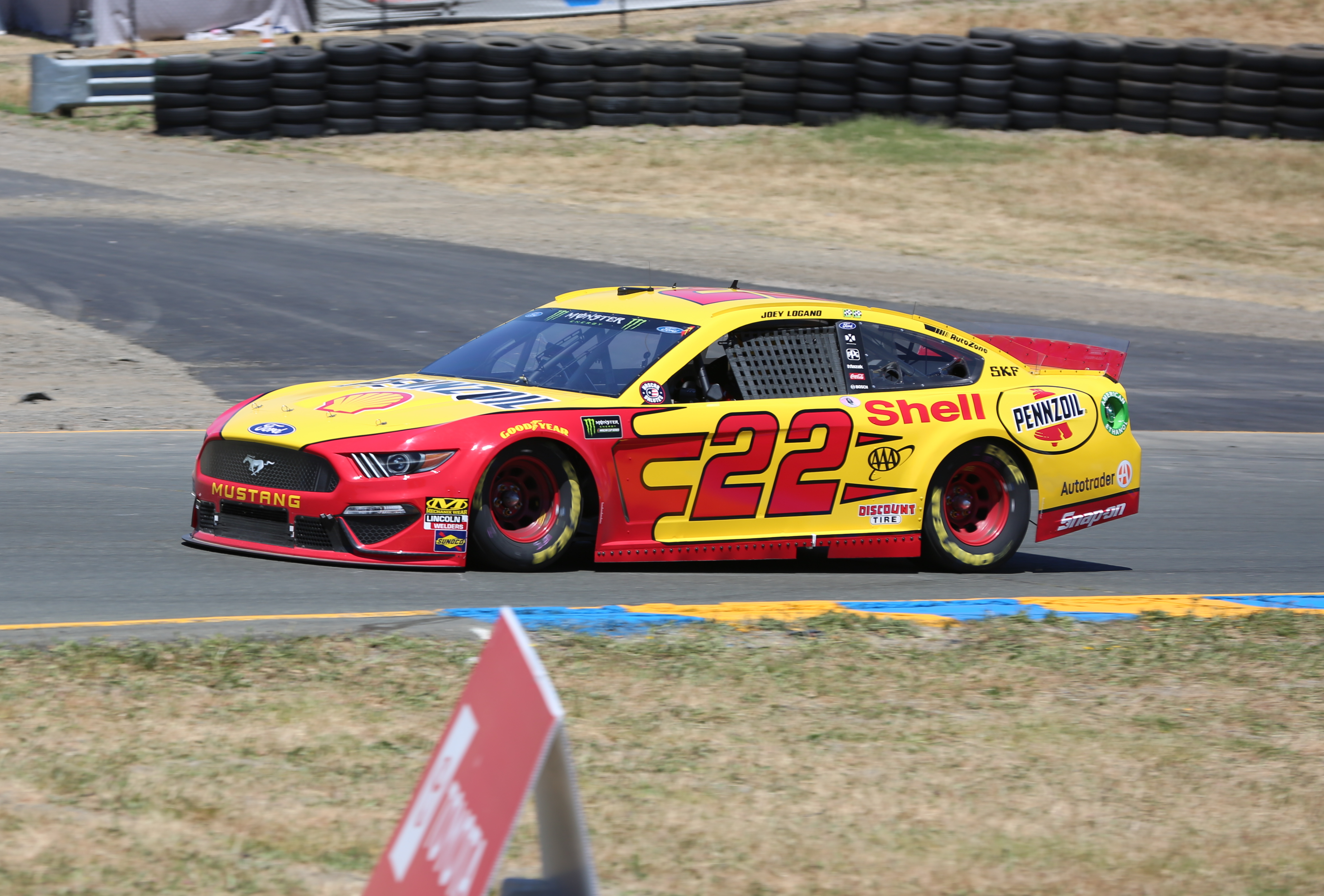
Joey Logano's 2019 Cup Mustang

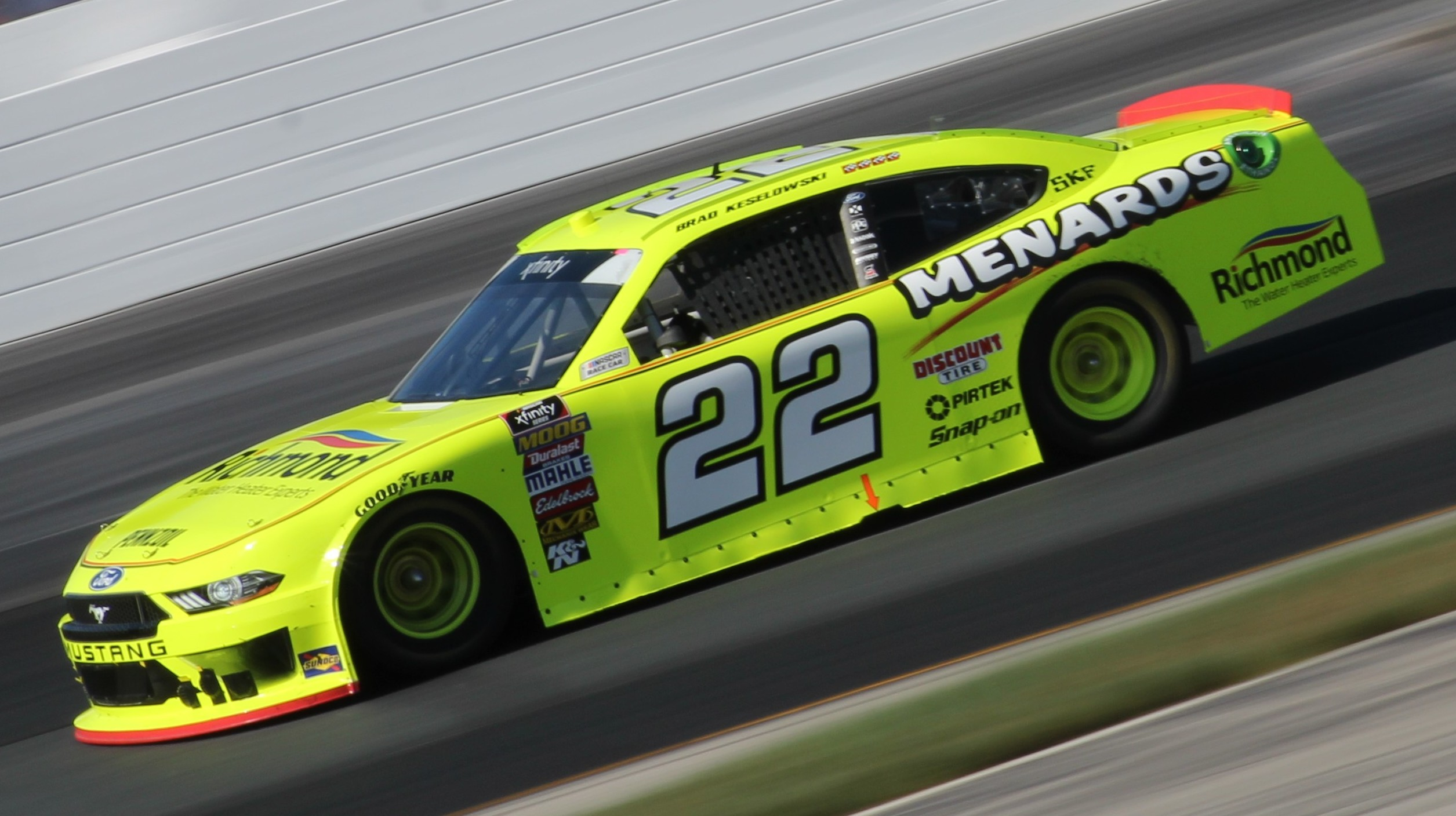
Brad Keselowski's 2018 Xfinity Mustang at New Hampshire Motor Speedway

The Shelby Mustang GT350R-C, the race version of the GT350R, was campaigned by Multimatic Motorsports in the Continental Tire Sports Car Challenge during the 2015 and 2016 seasons, winning the 2016 drivers' and constructors' championships. For 2017, the new Mustang GT4 racecar was built and sold by Multimatic.

A Mustang shaped profile draped over a spaceframe competed in the Australian Supercars Championship in 2020 with DJR Team Penske, Kelly Grove Racing and Tickford Racing.

The Mustang replaced the Fusion in the 2019 Monster Energy NASCAR Cup Series season. It was also run in the NASCAR Cup Series and Xfinity Series where it won its first championship in the 2022 NASCAR Cup Series from its driver Joey Logano.

== Sales ==
In 2016, about 25% sales in the first half of the year went to rental and corporate fleet.

=== By region ===
Model year	US	Canada	Europe	China	Australia	Latin America	Global total
2015	122,439	6,933	4,889	5,622	121	–	140,004
2016	105,932	7,655	15,204	3,126	6,208	–	138,125
2017	81,866	8,348	13,241	4,225	9,165	339	125,809
2018	75,842	8,055	9,851	3,173	6,412	2,911	113,066
2019	72,489	7,628	10,071	–	3,948	1,878	102,090
2020	61,090	4,636	7,495	–	2,923	1,021	77,165
2021	52,414	4,224	3,865	–	2,827	1,143	64,473
2022	47,566	3,808	3,200	–	1,887	1,166	57,627
2023	53,159				1,475		

== Production ==
The 2015 Ford Mustang began production at the Flat Rock, Michigan plant on Monday, July 14, 2014. Flat Rock Mustang production had initially been scheduled for August 11, 2014, being moved forward by 4 weeks for undisclosed reasons. U.S. market launch of the 2015 Mustang range was scheduled on September 15, 2014, for the coupe and October 27, 2014, for the convertible.

The sixth generation Mustang ended production at the Flat Rock Assembly Plant on April 6, 2023.

== Awards ==
- Car and Driver's 10Best list in 2017 (Shelby GT350/GT350R model).
- Car and Driver's 10Best list in 2019 (GT and Bullitt models).
- Car and Driver's Greatest Of All Time (G.O.A.T.) list in 2020 (Shelby GT350/GT350R model).
