= Kemal Curić =

Bosnian-German automobile designer (born 1978)

- Born: Kemal Curić; February 17, 1978 (age 48); Sarajevo, SR Bosnia and Herzegovina, Yugoslavia
- Occupation: Automobile designer

Kemal Curić (born February 17, 1978) is a Bosnian-German automotive designer born in Sarajevo. Curić is widely known for his work at Ford, where he was responsible for numerous concept and production cars.

== Biography ==
Curić was born in Sarajevo, Bosnia and Herzegovina, due to war in Bosnia and Herzegovina, he moved to Dortmund, Germany in 1995. He graduated in Industrial design at Wuppertall University in 2003 and started to work for Ford in 2004, at first as an interior designer and from 2006 as an exterior designer on the 2011 Ford Focus program. Curić won an Interior Motives design award for student work in 2005. In 2009 and 2010 he was a guest speaker at the Automotive Design Conference in Zagreb.

When his design proposal won an internal design competition for the S550 Mustang program in December 2010, he moved to Ford North America in Dearborn and became lead exterior designer for the Ford Mustang in January 2011. After production body design approval on the S550 Mustang in December 2012, he assumed the position Mustang Design Manager in January 2013.

== Noted projects ==
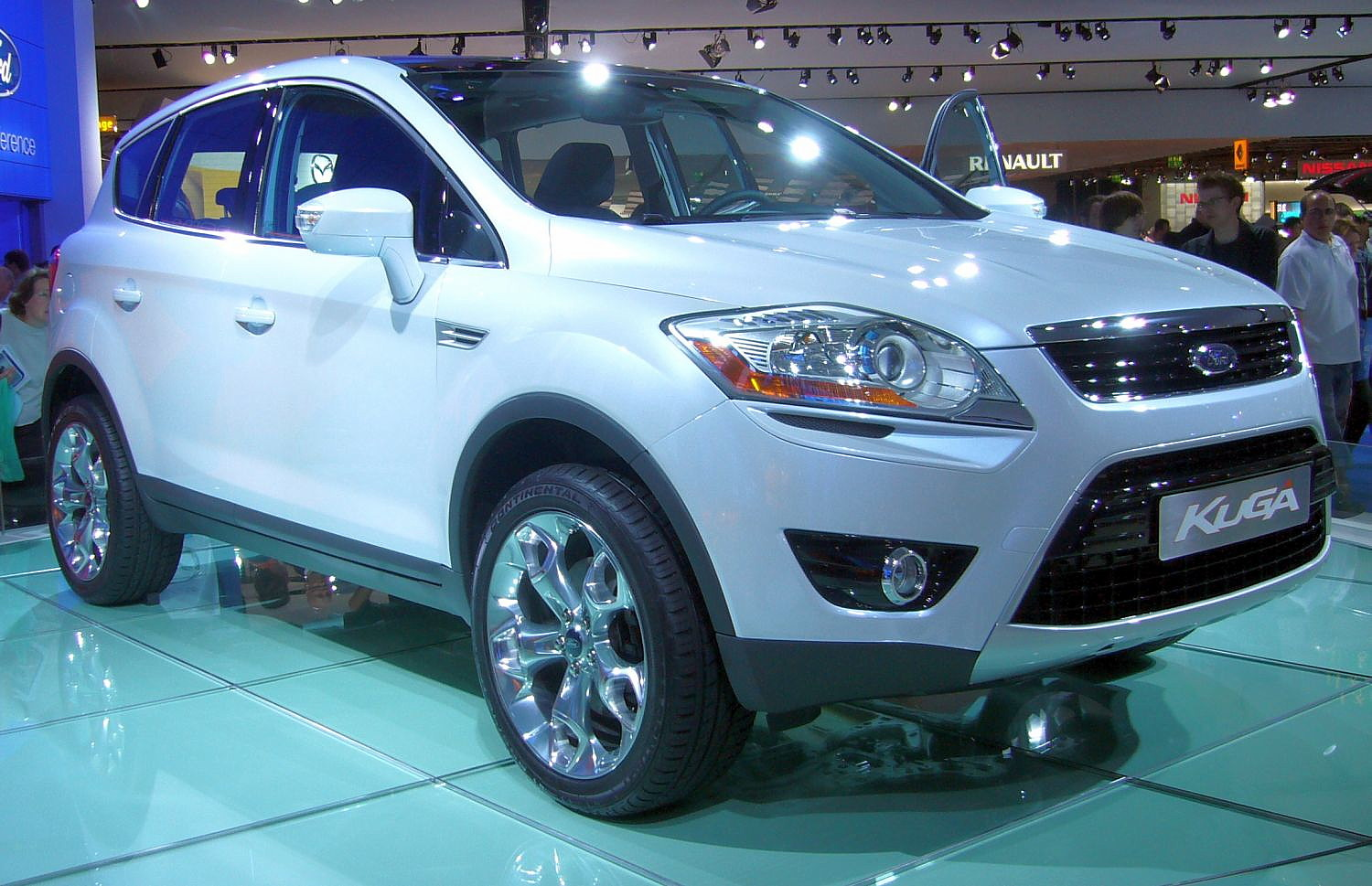
2007 Ford Kuga

- Ford Mustang (S550), exterior, (2012)
- Ford Vertrek, concept, exterior (2010)
- Ford Fusion/Mondeo, exterior (2010)
- Ford Escape/Kuga (MK II) (2009)
- Ford Focus (MK III) Station Wagon, exterior (2009)
- Ford Focus (MK III) 5dr, exterior (2008)
- Ford Iosis X, concept, interior (2006)
- Ford Iosis concept, interior (2005)
- Ford KA (MK II), interior (2004)
- Ford Fiesta, interior (2004)
- Lincoln Aviator - second generation
