= Joel Piaskowski =

American car designer from Michigan

Joel Piaskowski is an American car designer from Michigan. In 2014 he was appointed head of Ford of Europe design team.

== Career ==
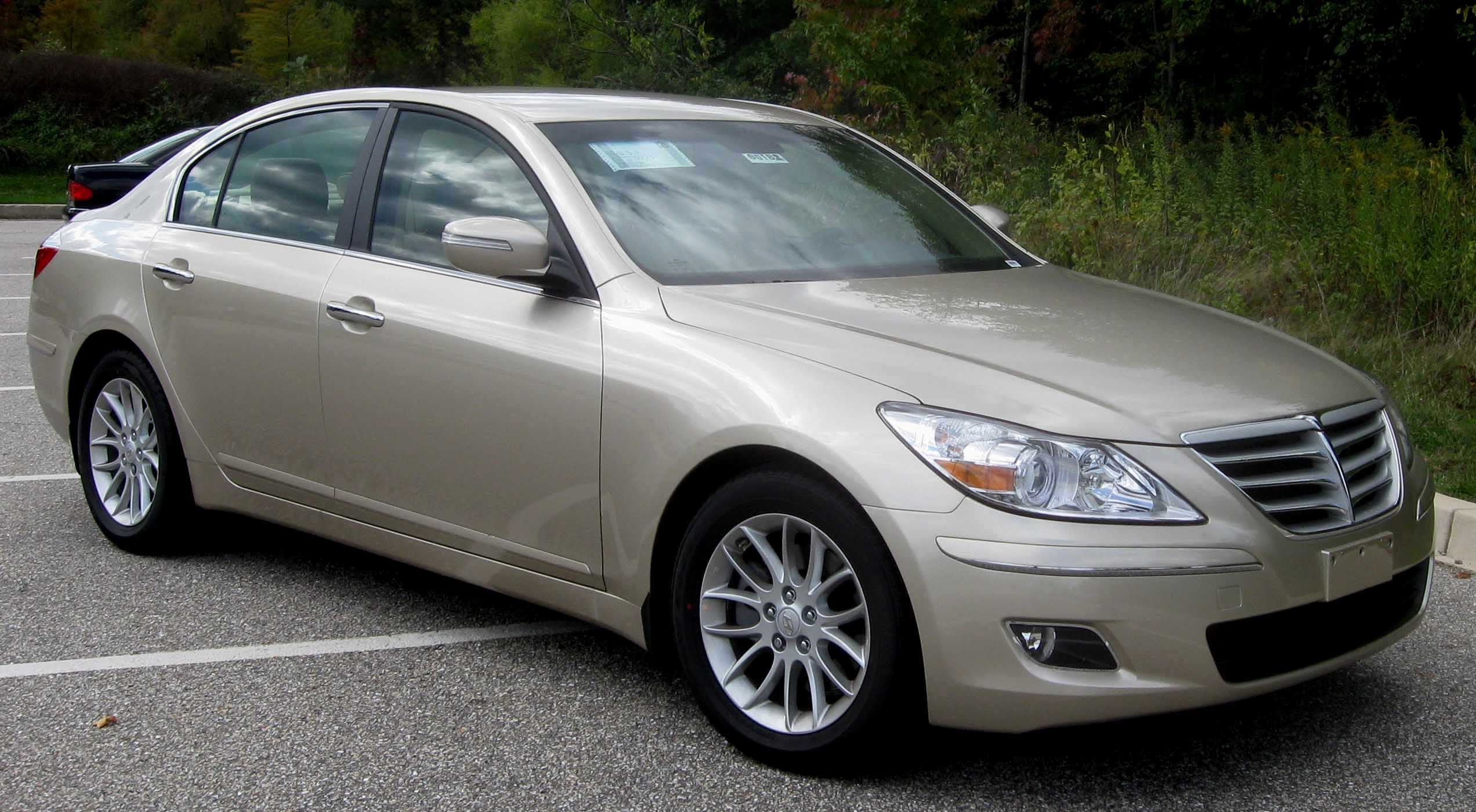
1st generation Hyundai Genesis

Piaskowski studied at the College for Creative Studies in Detroit, graduating in 1990. He first worked with General Motors, where he stayed for 12 years and where his work included the Buick Lucerne.

Piaskowski moved to Hyundai in 2003 to run the US studio for six years, where he is credited with the design for the Genesis sedan and the Genesis Coupe. In 2009 Piaskowski had a short spell with Mercedes-Benz where he ran the advanced design center in California.

In 2010 he joined Ford as the director of exterior design for the Americas, working under Moray Callum. There, Piaskowski led the Mustang and F-150 projects. In May 2014 he was appointed head of Ford of Europe design, taking over from Martin Smith in July.

Piaskowski is known in the Detroit underground techno community as the originator of the "German Techno Tape", a one-of-a-kind collection of Techno and handbag originals from the late 90s Berlin scene.
