= Ford Escort (Europe) =

Small family car by Ford (1968–2004)

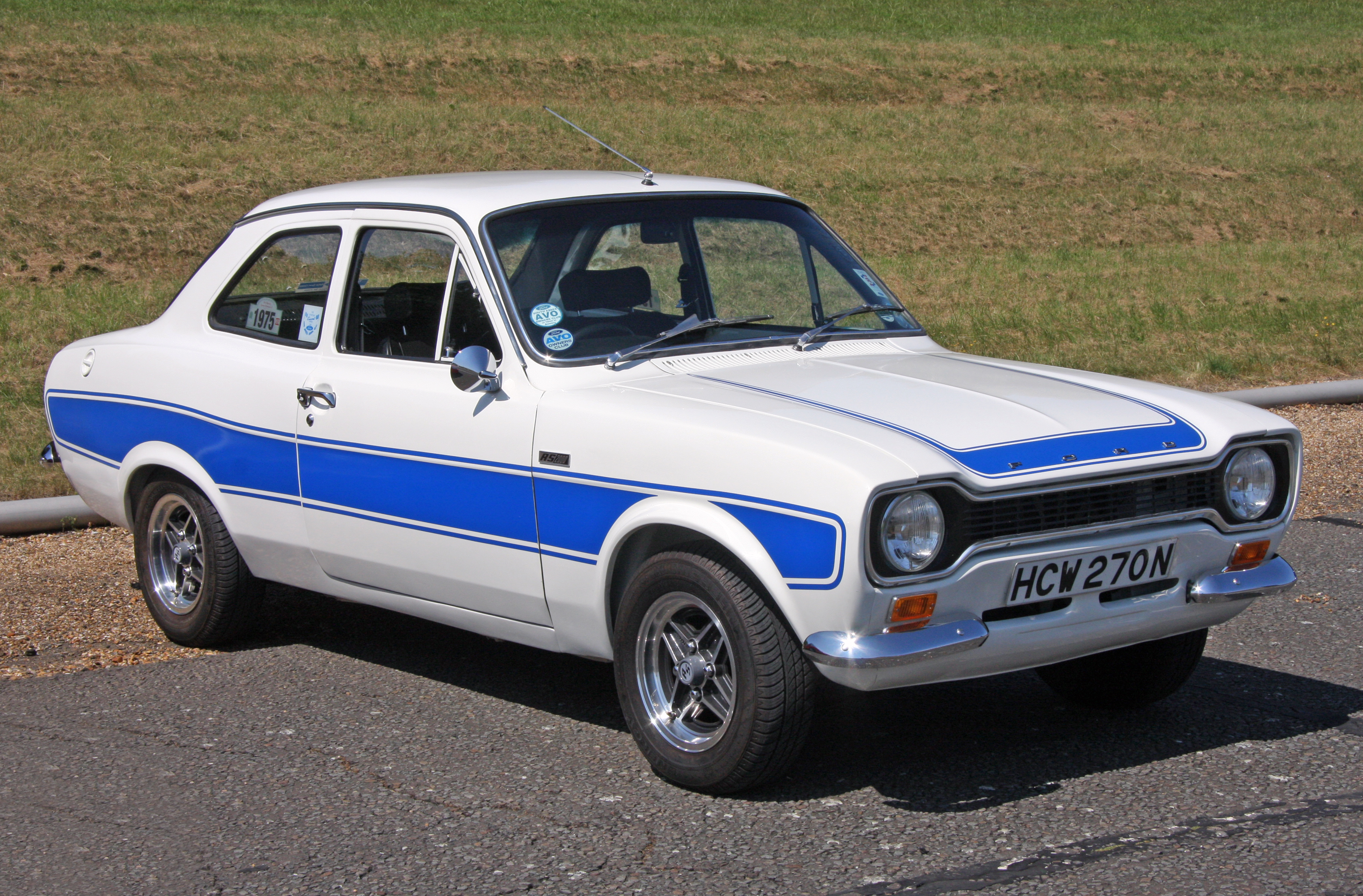
- Ford Escort RS2000 Mark I

Overview
- Manufacturer: Ford Europe
- Production: January 1968–2004

Body and chassis
- Class: Small family car (C)
- Layout: Front-engine, rear-wheel-drive (1967–1981, 1987); Front-engine, front-wheel-drive (1980–2004); Front-engine, four-wheel-drive (1990–2004)
- Related: Ford Orion (1983–1993)

Chronology
- Predecessor: Ford Anglia (UK)
- Successor: Ford Focus; Ford Laser (Asia-Pacific); Ford Meteor (Australia); Ford Transit Connect (for Escort van); Ford Escort (China)

The Ford Escort is a small family car that was manufactured by Ford of Europe from 1968 until 2004. In total, the six generations were spread across three basic platforms: the original, rear-wheel-drive Mk.1/Mk.2 (1968–1980), the "Erika" front-wheel-drive Mk.3/Mk.4 (1980–1992), and the final CE-14 Mk.5/Mk.6 (1990–2002) version. Its successor, the Ford Focus, was released in 1998, but the final generation of Escort was phased out gradually, with the panel van version ending production in 2002 in favour of the Ford Transit Connect.

The Escort was frequently the best-selling car in Britain during the 1980s and 1990s. More than 4.1 million Escorts of all generations were sold there over a period of 33 years.

In 2014, Ford revived the Escort name for a car based on the second-generation Ford Focus, sold in the Chinese market.

== Ford Escort 100E (1955) ==
The first use of the "Ford Escort" name was for a reduced-specification version of the Ford Squire, a 1950s estate-car version of the British Ford Anglia 100E.

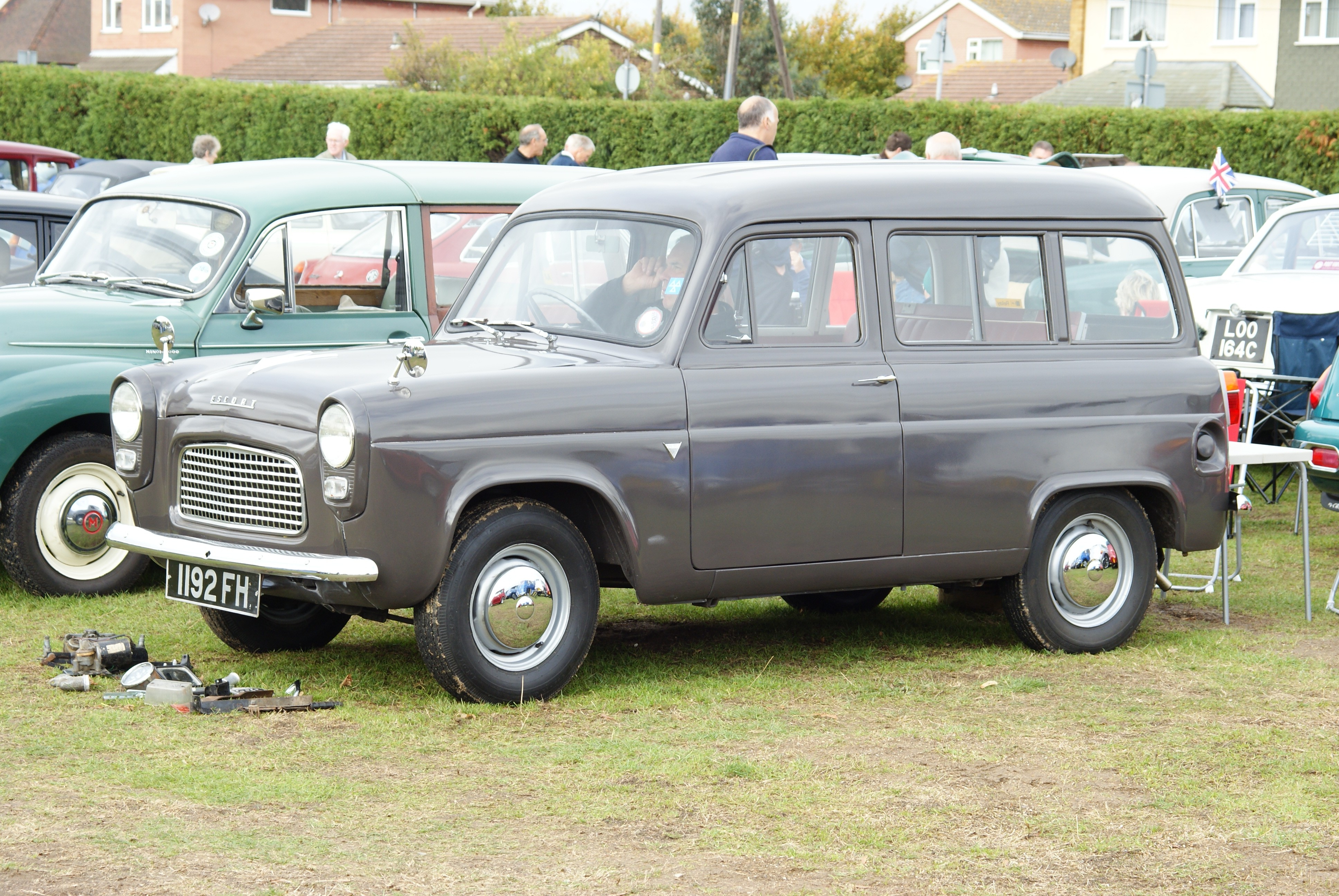
Ford Escort 100E

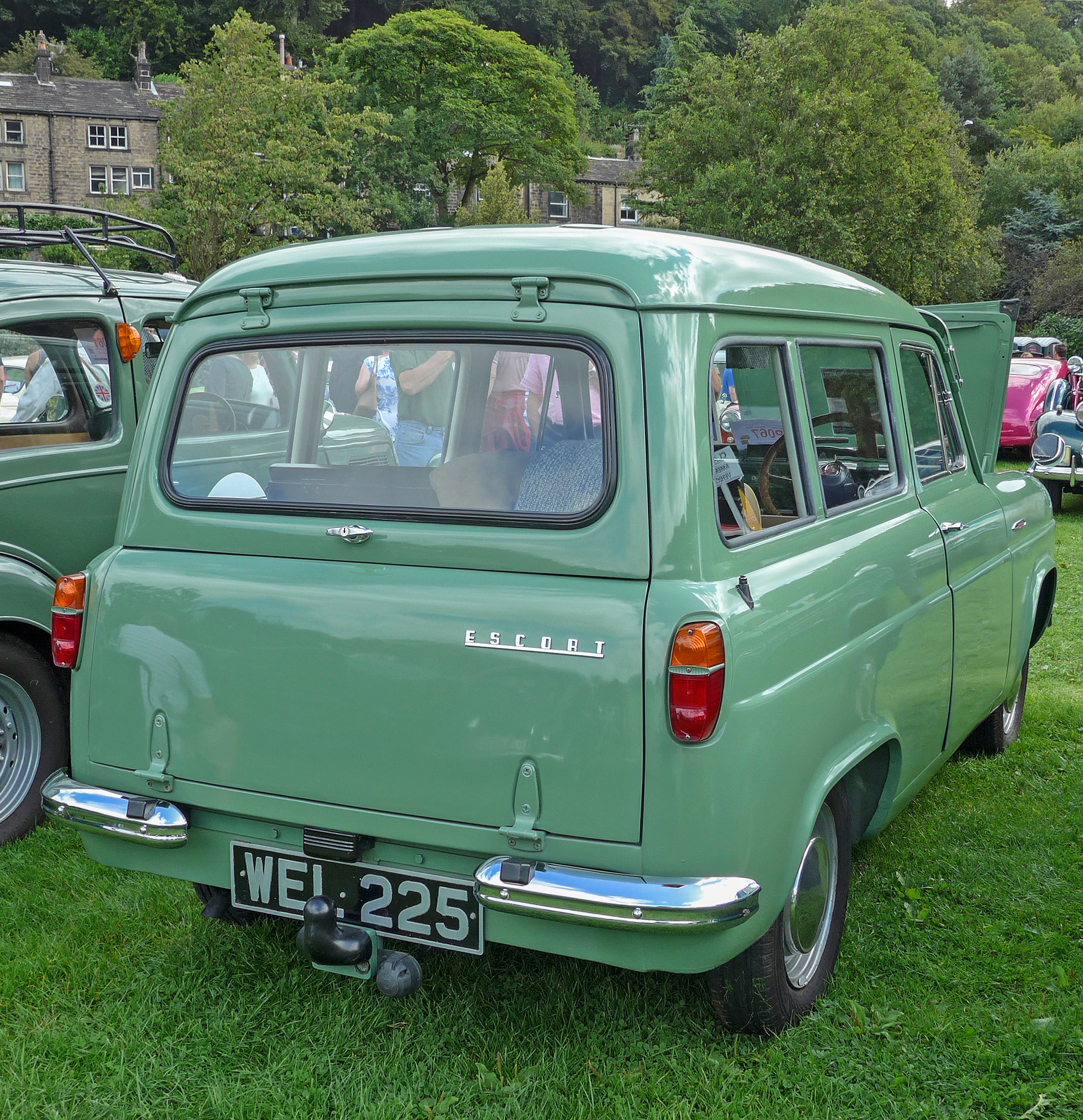
Ford Escort 100E

== First generation (1967) ==
First generation
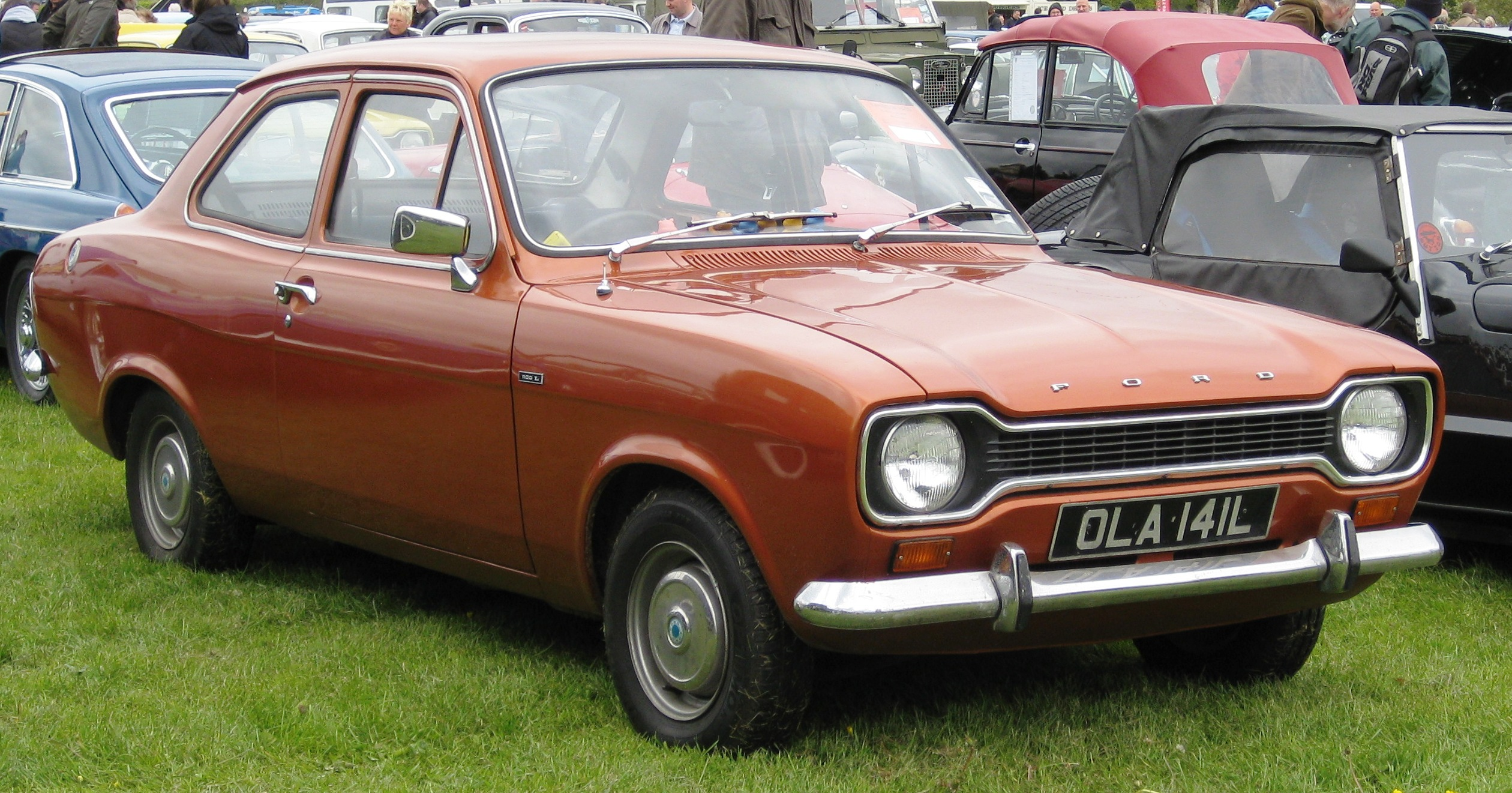
- 1972 Ford Escort 1100 L Mark I 2-door saloon

Overview
- Production: November 1967 – March 1975
- Assembly: United Kingdom: Dagenham (Ford Dagenham); United Kingdom: Halewood (Halewood Body & Assembly); Belgium: Genk (Genk Body & Assembly); Germany: Saarlouis (Ford Germany); Australia: Homebush (Ford Australia); Ireland: Cork (Ford Ireland); Israel: Nazareth (Autocars); New Zealand: Seaview (Ford New Zealand); Portugal: Azambuja (Ford Lusitana S.A.R.L.); Taiwan: Taipei (Ford Lio Ho)

Body and chassis
- Body style: 2/4-door saloon; 3-door estate; 2-door van
- Layout: Front-engine, rear-wheel-drive

Powertrain
- Engine: 0.9 L Crossflow I4; 1.1 L Crossflow I4; 1.3 L Crossflow I4; 1.6 L Crossflow I4; 1.6 L Lotus-Ford Twin Cam I4; 1.6 L Cosworth BDA I4; 1.7 L Cosworth BDB I4 (motorsport only); 2.0 L Pinto TL20H I4

Dimensions
- Wheelbase: 94.5 in (2,400 mm)
- Length: 159.25 in (4,045 mm) (saloon); 160.8 in (4,084 mm) (estate)
- Width: 61.8 in (1,570 mm)
- Height: 58.5 in (1,486 mm)
- Curb weight: 1,690 lb (767 kg)

The Mark I Ford Escort was introduced in Ireland and the United Kingdom at the end of 1967, making its show debut at the Brussels Motor Show in January 1968. It replaced the successful, long-running Anglia. The Escort was also presented in Europe as the first passenger car to be developed by the merged Ford of Europe (the Transit van having been the first product of this collaboration). Escort production commenced at the Halewood plant in England during the closing months of 1967, and for left-hand-drive markets during September 1968 at the Ford plant in Genk.

Initially, the continental Escorts differed slightly under the skin from the UK-built ones. The front suspension and steering gear were configured differently and the brakes were fitted with dual hydraulic circuits; also, the wheels fitted on the Genk-built Escorts had wider rims. At the beginning of 1970, continental European production transferred to a new plant on the edge of Saarlouis, West Germany.

The Escort was a commercial success in several parts of Western Europe, but nowhere more so than in the UK, where the national bestseller of the 1960s, BMC's Austin/Morris 1100 was beginning to show its age, while Ford's own Cortina had grown, both in dimensions and in price, beyond the market niche at which it had originally been pitched. It competed with the Vauxhall Viva, and from early 1970, the Rootes Group's Hillman Avenger.

In June 1974, six years after the car's UK introduction, Ford announced the completion of the two-millionth Ford Escort, a milestone hitherto unmatched by any Ford model outside the US. Ford also stated that 60% of the two million Escorts had been built in Britain. In West Germany, cars were built at a slower rate of around 150,000 cars per year, slumping to 78,604 in 1974, which was the last year for the Escort Mk1. Many of the German built Escorts were exported, notably to Benelux and Italy; from the perspective of the West German domestic market, the car was cramped and uncomfortable when compared with the well-established and comparably priced Opel Kadett, and it was technically primitive when set against the successful imported Fiat 128 and Renault 12. Subsequent generations of the Escort closed the gap somewhat, but in Europe's largest auto market, Escort sales volumes always came in significantly behind those of the General Motors Kadett and its Astra successor.

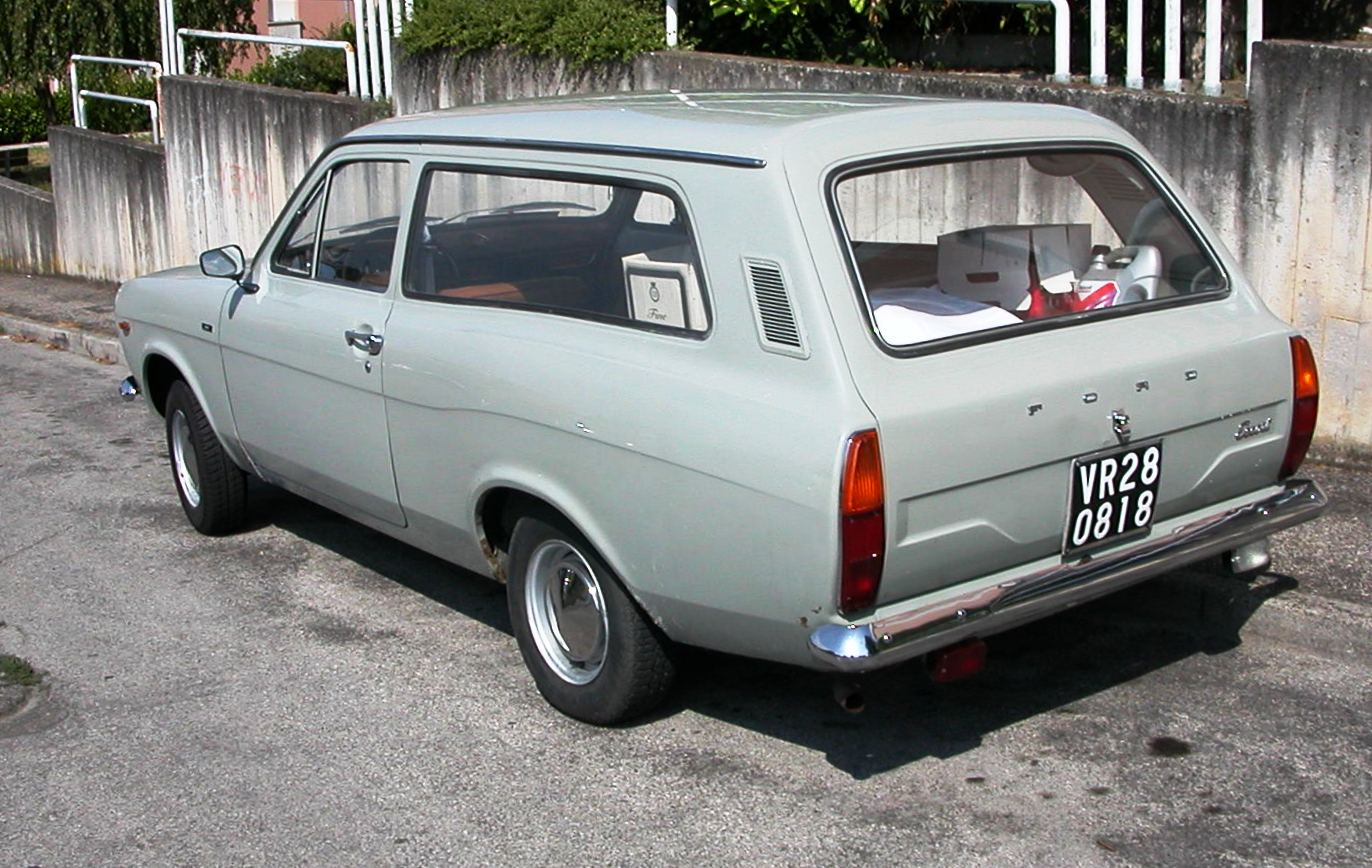
Just over two months after the launch of the saloon/sedan, Ford announced a three-door station wagon / estate version of their new Escort.

The Escort had conventional rear-wheel drive and a four-speed manual gearbox or three-speed automatic transmission. The suspension consisted of MacPherson strut front suspension and a simple live axle mounted on leaf springs. The Escort was the first small Ford to use rack-and-pinion steering. The Mark I featured contemporary styling cues in tune with its time: a subtle Detroit-inspired "Coke bottle" waistline and the "dogbone" shaped front grille – perhaps the car's main stylistic feature. Similar Coke bottle styling featured in the larger Cortina Mark III, launched in 1970 (a visually similar reskinned version of the Cortina was built in West Germany as the Taunus).

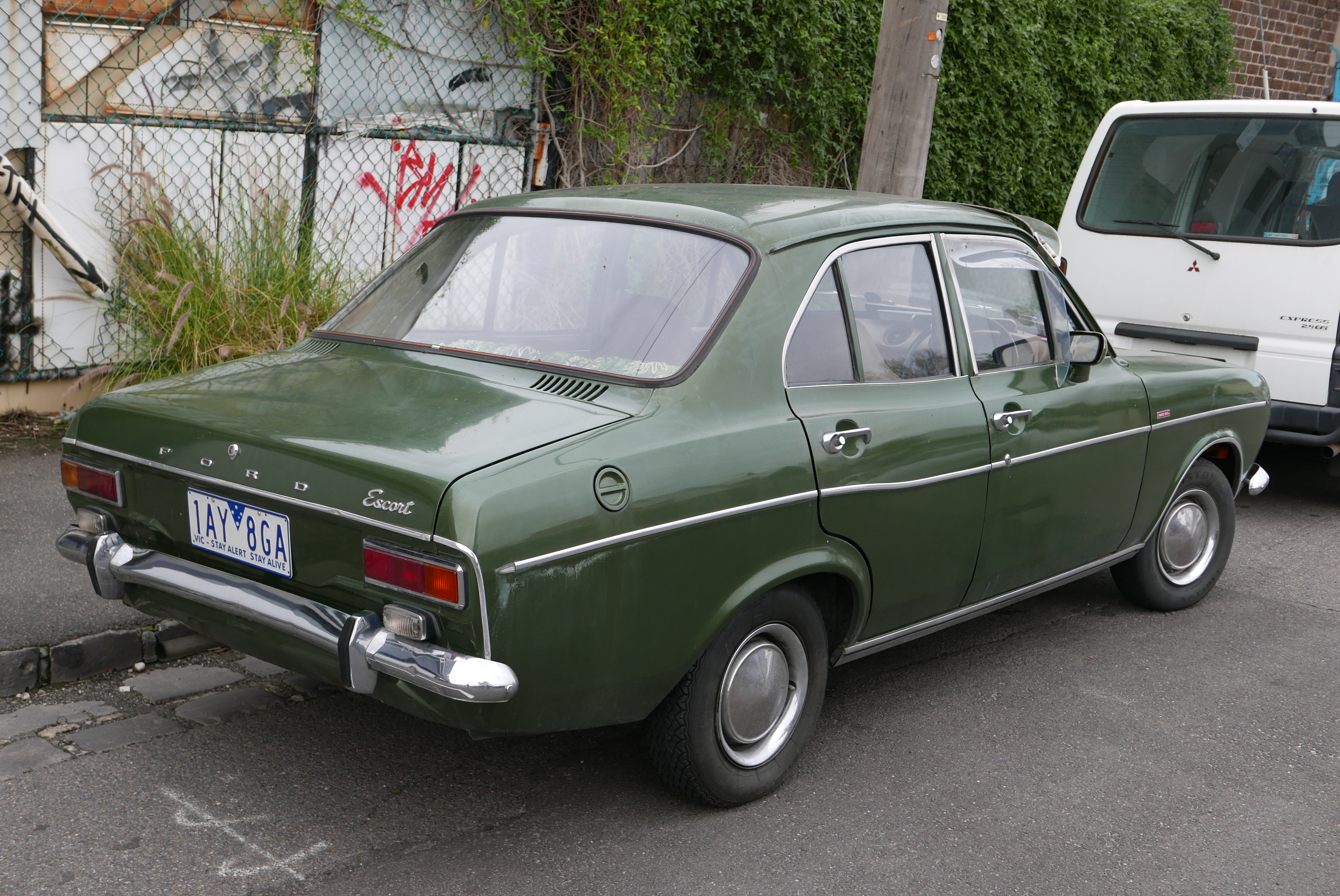
Less than two years after launch, Ford offered a four-door version of the Escort.

Initially, the Escort was sold as a two-door saloon (with circular front headlights and rubber flooring on the "De Luxe" model). The "Super" model featured rectangular headlights, carpets, a cigar lighter, and a water temperature gauge. A two-door estate was introduced at the end of March 1968, which, with the back seat folded down, provided a 40% increase in maximum load space over the old Anglia 105E estate, according to the manufacturer. The estate featured the same engine options as the saloon, but it also included a larger, 7 1/2-inch-diameter (190 mm) clutch, stiffer rear springs, and in most configurations, slightly larger brake drums or discs than the saloon. A panel van appeared in April 1968 and the four-door saloon (a body style the Anglia was never available in for UK market) in 1969.

Underneath the bonnet was the Kent crossflow engine also used in the smallest-capacity North American Ford Pinto. Diesel engines on small family cars were rare, and the Escort was no exception, initially featuring only petrol engines – in 1.1 L, and 1.3 L versions. A 940 cc engine was also available in some export markets such as Italy and France. This tiny engine remained popular in Italy, where it was carried over for the Escort Mark II, but in France, it was discontinued during 1972.

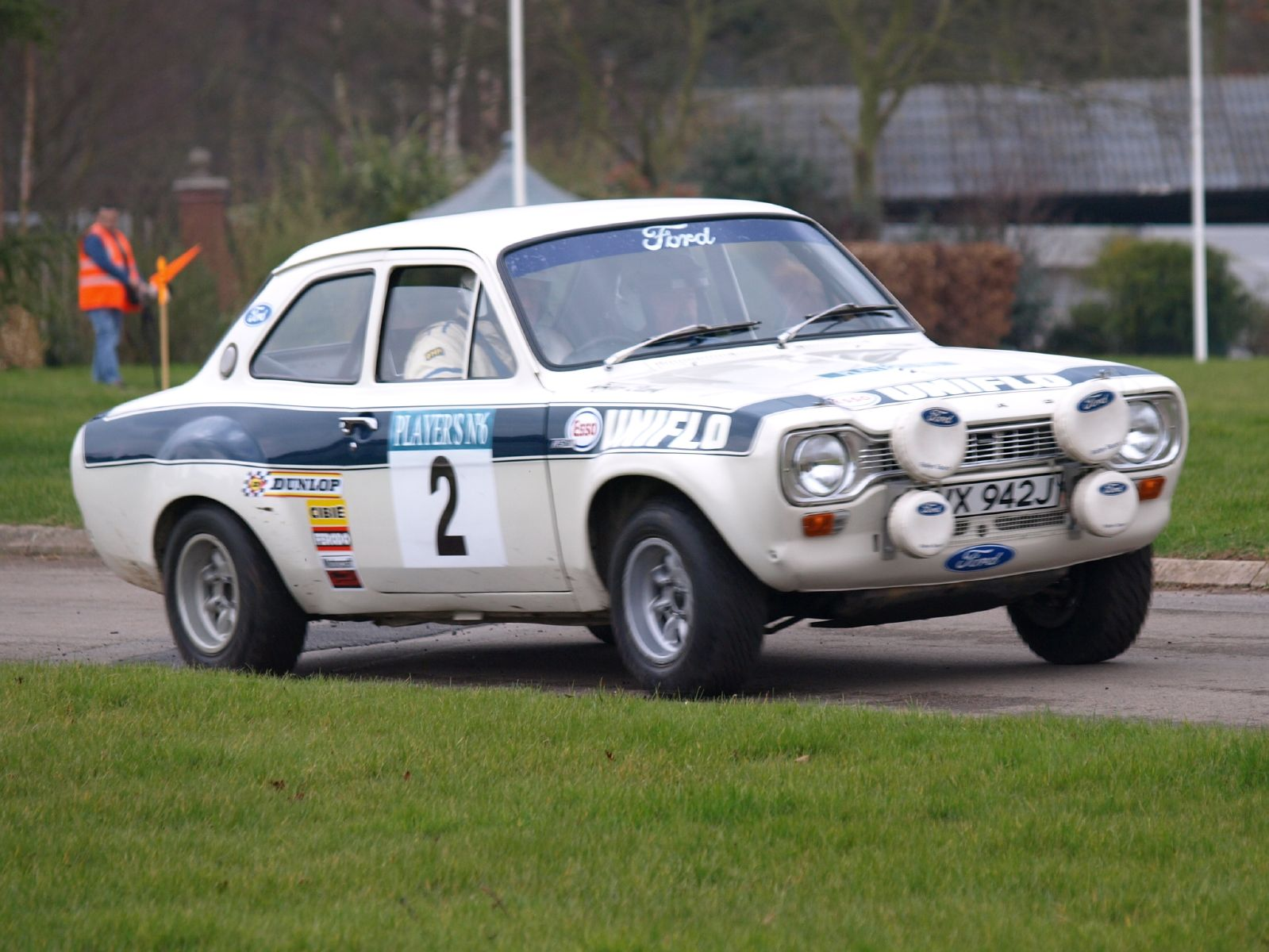
Roger Clark's 1972 RAC Rally-winning Escort RS1600

A 1300GT performance version was fitted with a tuned 1.3 L crossflow (OHV) engine with a Weber carburetor and uprated suspension. This version featured additional instrumentation with a tachometer, battery charge indicator, and oil pressure gauge. The same tuned 1.3 L engine was also used in a variation sold as the Escort Sport, that used the flared front wings from the AVO range of cars, but featured trim from the more basic models. Later, an "executive" version of the Escort was produced known as the "1300E". This featured the same 13-inch road wheels and flared wings of the Sport, but was trimmed in an upmarket fashion for the time, with wood trim on the dashboard and door cappings.

A higher-performance version for rallies and racing was available, the Escort Twin Cam, built for Group 2 international rallying. It had an engine with a Lotus-made, eight-valve, twin camshaft head fitted to the 1.5 L non-crossflow block, which had a bigger bore than usual to give a capacity of 1,558 cc. This engine had originally been developed for the Lotus Elan. Production of the Twin Cam, which was originally produced at Halewood, was phased out as the Cosworth-engined RS1600 (RS denoting Rallye Sport) production began. The most famous edition of the Twin Cam was raced on behalf of Ford by Alan Mann Racing in the British Saloon Car Championship in 1968 and 1969, sporting a full Formula 2 Ford FVA 16-valve engine, producing over 200 hp. The Escort, driven by Australian driver Frank Gardner, went on to comfortably win the 1968 championship.

The Mark I Escort became one of the most successful rally cars of all time. The Ford works team was practically unbeatable in the late 1960s and early 1970s. Perhaps the Escort's greatest victory was in the 1970 London to Mexico World Cup Rally, driven by Finland's Hannu Mikkola and Swedish co-driver Gunnar Palm. This gave rise to the Escort Mexico (1598 cc crossflow-engined) special-edition road versions in honour of the rally car. Introduced in November 1970, 10,352 Mexico Mark Is were built using bodyshells with additional strengthening panels in high-stress areas, making them more suitable for competition.

In addition to the Mexico, the RS1600 was developed with a 1601 cc Cosworth BDA, which used a crossflow block with a 16-valve Cosworth cylinder head, named "Belt Drive A Series". Both the Mexico and RS1600 were built at Ford's Advanced Vehicle Operations facility located at the Aveley Plant in South Essex. With higher-performance engines and sports suspension, like the Mexico, these models featured the strengthened bodyshell.

Ford also produced an RS2000 model as an alternative to the somewhat temperamental RS1600, featuring a 2.0 L Pinto (OHC) engine. This also clocked up some rally and racing victories and pre-empted the hot hatch market as a desirable but affordable performance road car. Like the Mexico and RS1600, this car was produced at the Aveley plant using the strengthened bodyshell.

The Escort was built in Germany and Britain, as well as in Australia and New Zealand.

=== Model range ===
Model	Year	Capacity	Compression	Head	Power/rpm	Torque/rpm
Escort 1100 Low Compression	1968–1970	1098 cc	8:1	OHV (8V)	40 hp (30 kW; 41 PS) at 5300	70.5 N⋅m (52.0 lb⋅ft) at 3000 rpm
Escort 1100 and Deluxe and Super	1968–1970	1098 cc	9:1	OHV (8V)	45 hp (34 kW; 46 PS) at 5300	73.5 N⋅m (54.2 lb⋅ft) at 2800 rpm
Escort 1300 Low Compression	1968–1970	1298 cc	8:1	OHV (8V)	48 hp (36 kW; 49 PS) at 5000	85 N⋅m (63 lb⋅ft) at 2400 rpm
Escort 1300 and Deluxe and Super, Manual and Automatic	1968–1970	1298 cc	9:1	OHV (8V)	51 hp (38 kW; 52 PS) at 5000	92 N⋅m (68 lb⋅ft) at 2500 rpm
Escort 1300 GT	1968–1970	1298 cc	9.2:1	OHV (8V)	63 hp (47 kW; 64 PS) at 5800	
Escort Twin Cam	1968–1971	1558 cc	9.4:1	DOHC (8V)	105 hp (78 kW; 106 PS) at 5500	140 N⋅m (100 lb⋅ft) at 4000 rpm
Escort 1100 L Low Compression	1970–1974	1098 cc	8:1	OHV (8V)	43 hp (32 kW; 44 PS) at 6000	70.5 N⋅m (52.0 lb⋅ft) at 3000 rpm
Escort 1100 L/XL, Manual and Automatic	1970–1974	1098 cc	9:1	OHV (8V)	48 hp (36 kW; 49 PS) at 6000	73.5 N⋅m (54.2 lb⋅ft) at 3000 rpm
Escort 1300 L/XL Manual and Automatic	1970–1974	1298 cc	9:1	OHV (8V)	56 hp (42 kW; 57 PS) at 5500	91 N⋅m (67 lb⋅ft) at 3000 rpm
Escort 1300 GT and Sport	1970–1974	1298 cc	9.2:1	OHV (8V)	71 hp (53 kW; 72 PS) at 6000	92 N⋅m (68 lb⋅ft) at 4000 rpm
Escort 1300E	1973–1974	1298 cc	9.2:1	OHV (8V)	71 hp (53 kW; 72 PS) at 6000	92 N⋅m (68 lb⋅ft) at 4000 rpm
Escort Mexico	1970–1974	1598 cc	9:1	OHV (8V)	85 hp (63 kW; 86 PS) at 5500	124.5 N⋅m (91.8 lb⋅ft) at 4000 rpm
Escort RS 1600	1970–1974	1601 cc	10:1	DOHC (16V)	115 hp (86 kW; 117 PS) at 6500	152 N⋅m (112 lb⋅ft) at 4000 rpm
Escort RS 2000	1972–1974	1993 cc	9.2:1	SOHC (8V)	100 hp (75 kW; 101 PS) at 5700	135.5 N⋅m (99.9 lb⋅ft) at 4000 rpm

All models 1100 and 1300 were offered in two-door Saloon, four-door Saloon, and three-door Estate versions.

=== New Zealand ===
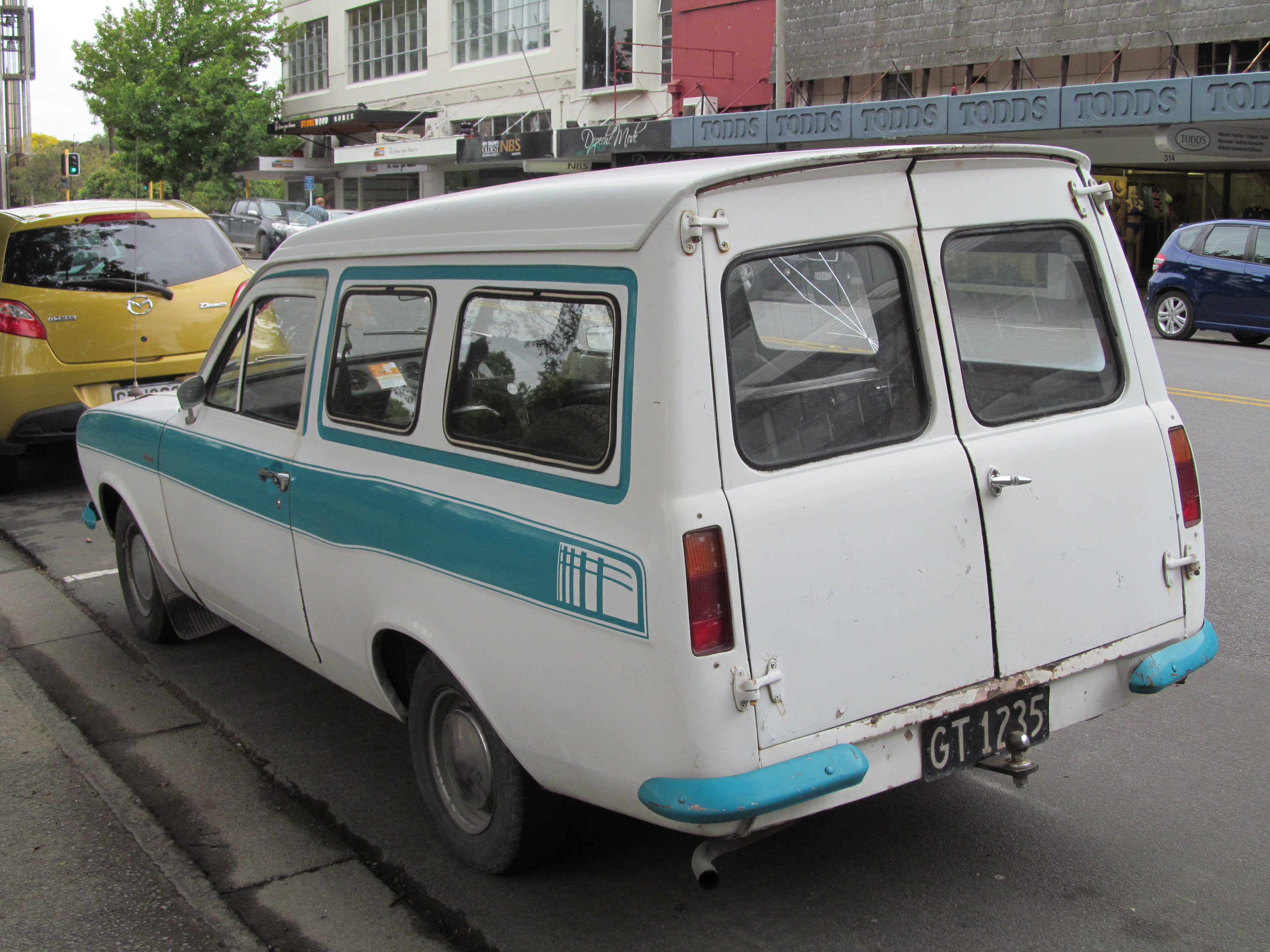
Ford Escort MK I van

Ford New Zealand's Seaview plant in Lower Hutt built 1.1- and 1.3-litre versions, initially as Deluxe (1.1) and Super (1.3) two-door sedans plus panel vans. The four-door sedan was added in 1970. Trim levels were revised after the 1972 UK facelift with just one run of 1.3XLs (with the GT instrument pack) before these were downgraded to L trim. Base and L trims were offered to the end of the Mk I run. Some 1.6 Mexicos were imported in 1973–74 after the government temporarily freed up import licensing owing to a shortage of new cars. Estate versions were mostly imported.

=== Australia ===
The Mk I was produced by Ford Australia from 1970 to 1975 as a two- or four-door saloon and as a two-door panel van. 1100 cc and 1300 cc engines were offered, as was the 1558 cc twin cam unit., the last only in the Escort Twin Cam model, which was renamed the Escort GT 1600 in late 1971. Some 67,146 examples of the Mk I were built in Australia, with local sourcing bringing the Australian content of the vehicles to 85%. In 1975, Ford Australia imported 25 MK1 RS2000 Escorts from England for sale in the local market.

=== Israel ===
Assembly of the Mk I Escort was undertaken by Automotive Industries in Upper Nazareth, in conjunction with the local distributor, Israeli Automotive Corp. Assembly from UK-sourced kits started in April 1968. The last Mk I, a light green 1100 cc two-door, was produced on 14 November 1975. A total of 14,905 units was assembled in Israel, including 105 Escort 400 vans.

=== Japan ===
The Mk I Escort was sold in Japan, imported from the United Kingdom by Kintetsu Motors and was available with the 1.3 L engine in GT trim, and was sold alongside the Ford Cortina and the Ford Capri. Sales were helped by the fact that this generation Escort complied with Japanese government dimension regulations concerning vehicle dimensions and engine displacement. Only the four-door saloon was offered, and this was the only generation available to Japanese buyers. The engine displacement contributed to a lower annual road tax obligation to Japanese buyers, which helped sales.

=== South Africa ===
About 100 Mk 1 Escort RS1600s were sent to South Africa as knock-down kits (CKDs) in 1970/1 and were assembled in the Ford Port Elizabeth plant. They were sold through the Ford dealer network, but some of the initial cars suffered oil-feed problems, which was later rectified by Ford in collaboration with Cosworth.

A batch of 60 RS1600s was sold by Ford SA to Basil Green Motors in Edenvale, Johannesburg, which replaced the twin-cam BDA engines with the 2000 cc SOHC Pinto engine, and the car was renamed the Escort Perana.

Around 40 of the original cars retained the twin-cam BDA engine, and these cars were sold as RS1600s by Ford dealers throughout South Africa. These cars had an identification tag under the driver’s seat in addition to the Ford SA VIN tag in the engine compartment.

South African RS1600s had various detailed differences from the Ford UK cars. They were painted yellow with a black stripe to the rear panel and to the sills. They also had black blocks painted on the bonnet. The front seats were from the Capri V4.

== Second generation (1974) ==
Second generation
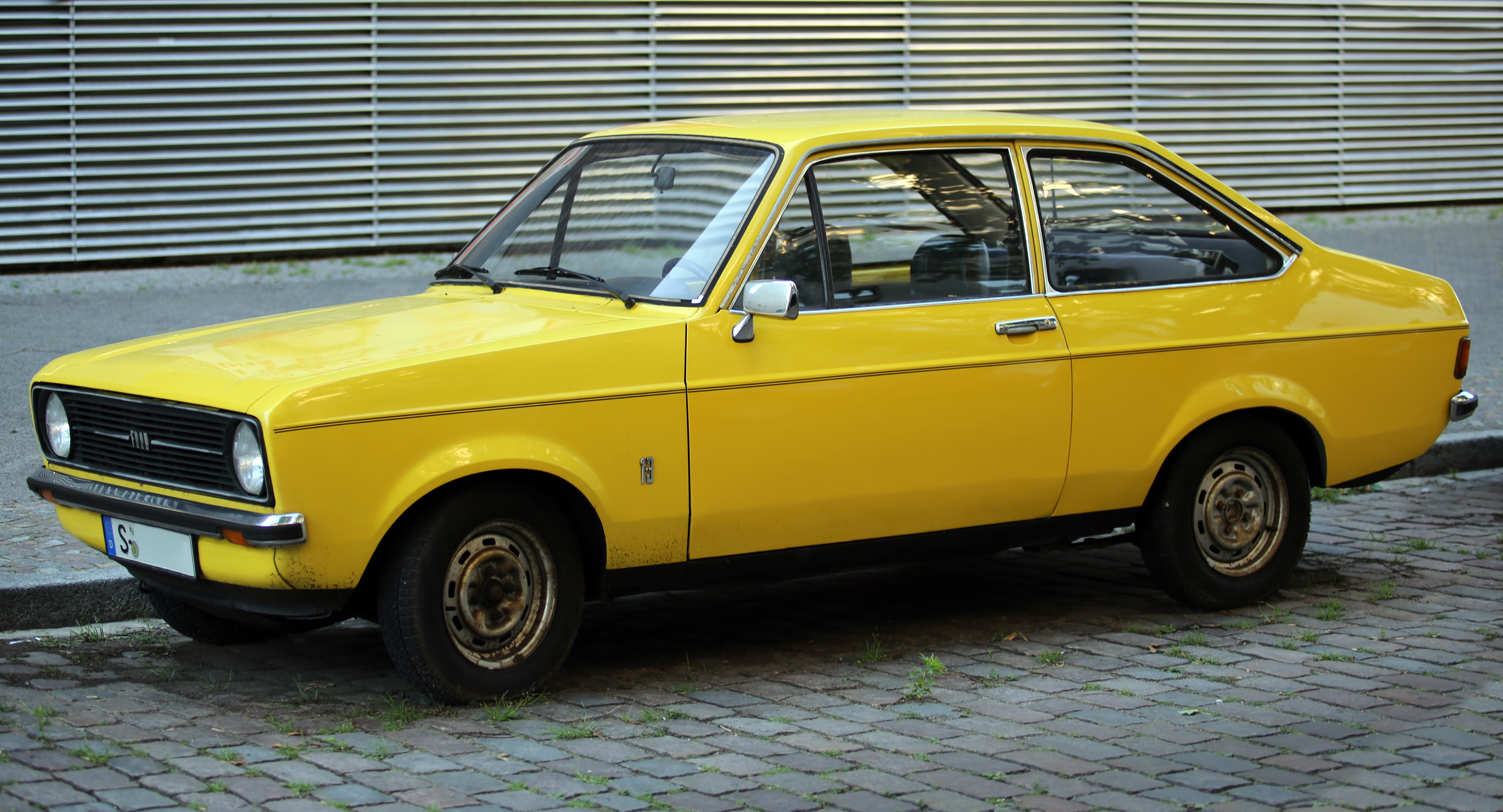
- Ford Escort Mark II 2-door saloon (1974–1977)

Overview
- Production: December 1974 – August 1980
- Assembly: United Kingdom: Dagenham (Ford Dagenham); United Kingdom: Halewood (Halewood Body & Assembly); Belgium: Genk (Genk Body & Assembly); Germany: Saarlouis (Ford Germany); Australia: Homebush (Ford Australia); Ireland: Cork (Ford Ireland); Israel: Nazareth (Autocars); Netherlands: Amsterdam; New Zealand: Wiri (Ford New Zealand); Portugal: Azambuja (Ford Lusitana S.A.R.L.); South Africa: Struandale, Port Elizabeth (FMCSA); Taiwan: Taipei (Ford Lio Ho)

Body and chassis
- Body style: 2/4-door saloon 3-door estate 2-door van
- Layout: Front-engine, rear-wheel-drive

Powertrain
- Engine: 940 cc Crossflow I4 (Italy only); 1.1 L Crossflow I4; 1.3 L Crossflow I4; 1.6 L Crossflow I4; 1.6 L Pinto TL16G I4; 1.8 L Cosworth BDE I4; 2.0 L Pinto TL20H I4; 2.0 L Cosworth BDG I4

Dimensions
- Wheelbase: 94.5 in (2,400 mm)
- Length: 156.5 in (3,975 mm) (saloon); 163 in (4,140 mm) (estate)
- Width: 61.8 in (1,570 mm)
- Height: 55.65 in (1,414 mm)
- Curb weight: 1,940 lb (880 kg)

The squarer-styled Mark II version appeared in January 1975. The first production models had rolled off the production lines on 2 December 1974.

Unlike the first Escort (which was developed by Ford of Britain), the second generation was developed jointly between the UK and Ford of Germany. Codenamed "Brenda" during its development, it used the same mechanical components, floorpan and core structure as the Mark I. The 940 cc engine was still offered in Italy where the smaller engine attracted tax advantages, but in the other larger European markets in Europe it was unavailable. The estate and van versions used the same doors, roof and rear panelwork as the Mark I, but with the Mark II front end and interior.

The car used a revised underbody, which had been introduced as a running change during the last six months production of the Mark I. The rear suspension still sat on leaf springs though some contemporaries such as the Hillman Avenger and Opel Kadett C/Vauxhall Chevette had moved on to coil springs. The car came in for criticism for its lack of oddments space, with a glove compartment available on only higher end models, and its stalk-mounted horn.

The "L" and "GL" models (2-door, 4-door, estate) were in the mainstream private sector, the "Sport", "RS Mexico", and "RS2000" in the performance market, the "Ghia" (2-door, 4-door) for a hitherto untapped small car luxury market, and "base / Popular" models for the bottom end. The base spec Popular versions for British market were divided into "Popular" and "Popular Plus", with the former being an "austerity" model with vinyl seats and rubber carpets, the 'Plus' version having a fully trimmed interior.

Panel-van versions catered to the commercial sector. The 1.6 L (1598 cc/97 CID) engine in the 1975 1.6 Ghia produced 84 hp (63 kW) with 125 N·m (92 ft·lbf) torque and weighed 955 kg (2105 lb).

In August 1977, the Escort received its first noticeable facelift, with the front grille, boot lid and steering wheel hub cap being fitted with the oval Ford logo instead of the previous single-letter lettering.

A further cosmetic update was given in 1978 (note that Australia received differing updates – see below), with L models gaining the square headlights (previously exclusive to the GL and Ghia variants) and there was an upgrade in interior and exterior specification for some models. All models (other than RS) had a new steering wheel and the horizontal chrome strip along the center of the grille removed. Underneath a wider front track was given.

In 1979 and 1980, three special edition Escorts were launched: the Linnet, Harrier and Goldcrest.

Production ended in Britain in August 1980, with other countries following soon after.

=== Europe ===
UK Market 1975.3–1977	2dr Saloon	4dr Saloon	2dr Estate
Escort Saloon	1100	1100	1100, 1100E^{2}, 1300
Escort Popular ^{1}	1100E, 1300		
Escort Popular Plus ^{1}	1100E, 1300	1100E, 1300	
Escort L ^{2}	1100/1100E, 1300	1100/1100E, 1300	1300
Escort GL	1300	1300	1300
Escort Sport^{3}	1300 GT, 1600 GT	1600 GT	
Escort Ghia	1300 GT, 1600 GT^{4}	1300 GT, 1600 GT	
Escort RS	RS Mexico (1600 ohc) RS1800 (Cosworth BDE) RS2000 (2000 ohc)		
1. Replaced Escort saloon (2dr & 4dr Sedan) in mid-1975; 2. 1100E engine replaced 1100 standard on Escort L, made optional on the Escort Estate from mid-1976.; 3. Four door Escort Sport discontinued after mid-1976; 4. Escort Ghia 1600 was four door only after mid-1976.
1100E = 1100 Economy, 1300GT / 1600 GT = 1300 or 1600 twin venturi carburetor

First facelift
UK Models 1977-78	2dr Saloon	4dr Saloon	2dr Estate
(Escort)			1100, 1300, 1100E
Popular	1100^{1}, 1100E, 1300		
Popular Plus	1100^{1}, 1100E, 1300	1100^{1}, 1100E, 1300	
L	1100^{1}, 1100E, 1300	1100^{1}, 1100E, 1300	1300
GL	1300	1300	1300
Ghia	1300GT	1300GT, 1600GT	
Sport	1300GT, 1600GT		
RS Mexico	1600 ohc		
RS2000	2000 ohc		
1. 1100 standard added to saloons early 1978

Second Facelift
UK Models 1978	2dr Saloon	4dr Saloon	2dr Estate
(Escort)			1100, 1100E, 1300
Popular	1100, 1100E, 1300		
Popular Plus	1100, 1100E, 1300	1100, 1100E, 1300	
L	1100, 1100E, 1300	1100, 1100E, 1300, 1600GT^{1}	1300
GL	1300	1300, 1600GT^{1}	1300
Sport	1300GT, 1600GT		
Ghia	1300GT	1300GT, 1600GT	
RS2000	2000 ohc		
RS2000 Custom	2000 ohc		
special edition "Goldcrest"		1300, 1600GT^{1}	
1. from late 1979; Popular discontinued from Jan 1980

=== Oceania ===
==== Australia ====
The Mk II Escort was assembled at Ford Australia's Homebush Plant, Sydney from March 1975 to 1980 in 2-door and 4-door sedan, and 2-door panel van forms – the estate versions were unavailable to the Australian market.

The sedan models were available in L, XL (later renamed GL) and Ghia forms, and a Sport pack option – similar to the 1300 and 1600 Sport models sold elsewhere. Unlike other markets – likely due to the estate's absence – the van was offered in a higher level of trim – a GL, and a Sport pack van was also available. Unusual fitments for the range not offered elsewhere on the Australian Escort included 'dog-dish' steel hubcaps, and high-backed front seats.

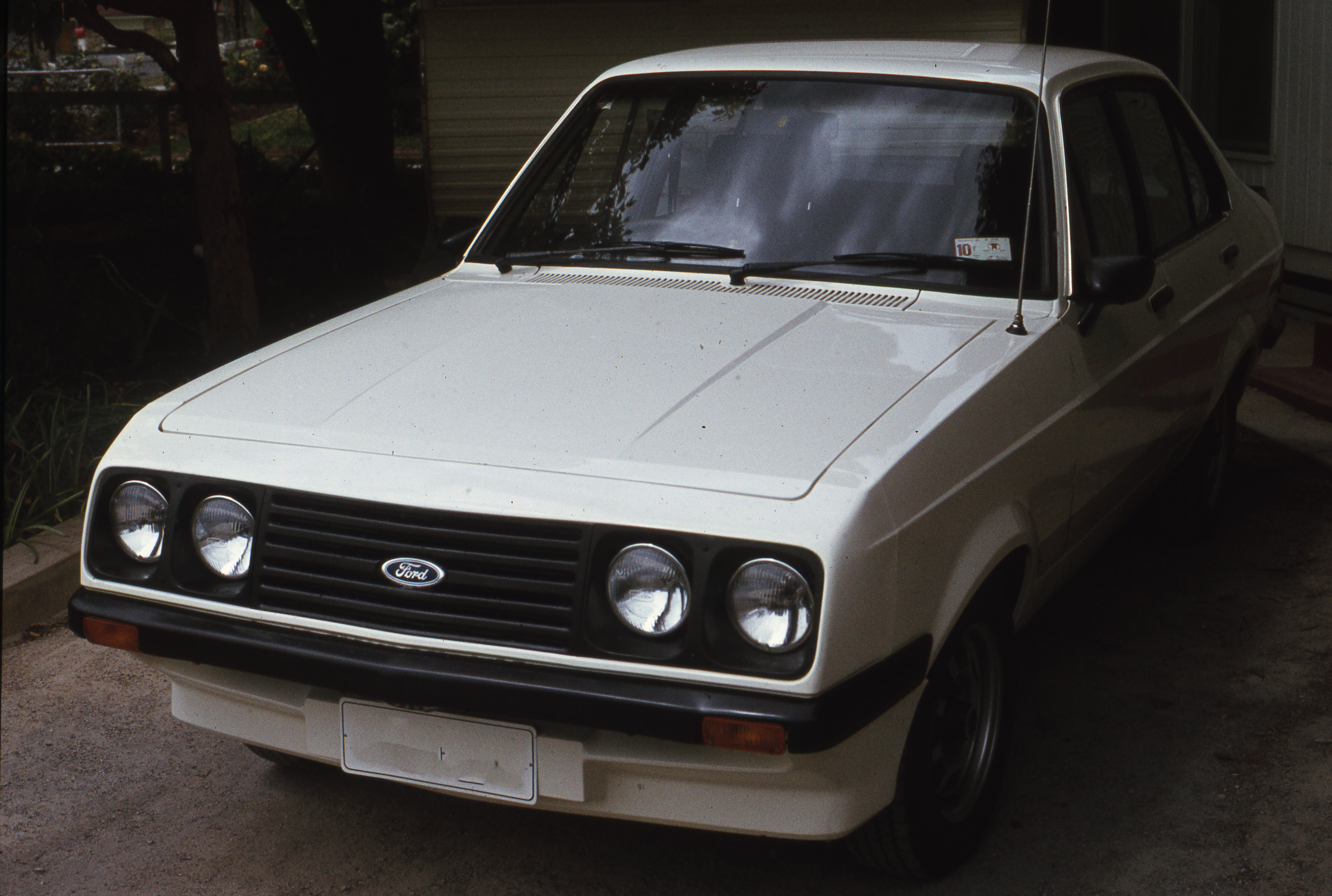
Australian 1979 Ford Escort RS2000 four-door form

The initial powerplants utilized in the Australian Escorts were Ford's 1.3 L and 1.6 L OHV Crossflow units, offered with either 4-speed manual or 3-speed automatic transmissions. In 1977, to cope with Australian emission laws, in particular ADR27A, the 1.3L models were dropped and the Ford Cortina's 2.0L OHC Pinto engine (in a lower tune to European units) was introduced to the Escort range, available as an option on nearly all models. Codenamed internally by Ford Australia as "BC", the Australian Escort range's bodies were modified to fit the larger engine and a redesigned fuel-tank, which involved the placement of the fuel filler being behind the rear numberplate.

In 1978, Ford Australia standardised the use of the blue oval logo across the Escort model range. These Escort models are identified by the familiar blue Ford oval in the centre of the grille and on the right of the bootlid. It also revamped the image of its 'leisure range' by introducing the Escort Sundowner panel van, positioning it as a youth-oriented lifestyle vehicle complete with bold body decorations and domed side windows, available in 1.6L and 2.0L forms. In 1979, Ford Australia gave the Escort an update, increasing basic equipment levels and standardising square headlights on L and GL models (previously only available on Escort Ghia). Chasing both youth and performance, Ford Australia introduced their take on the RS2000, which – complete with its slant-nose – was available in both two-door form and as a unique to Australia four-door, in a choice of five solid paint colours. These RS cars certainly looked the part, but were actually powered by the same 2.0-litre engine as the rest of the local Escort range, and available with a choice of manual or automatic transmission. A total of 2,400 Australian RS2000 cars were made.

While offered in many model forms, the Escort, like the Cortina, was not popular on the Australian market, largely due to expanding competition from Japanese imports and the established preference of Australian drivers for larger six-cylinder vehicles, including Ford Australia's own Falcon.

Australian Escort production ceased in late 1980, with 79,142 examples of the Mk II produced, the range being replaced by FWD derivatives of the Mazda 323/Familia, namely the Ford Laser 3-door and 5-door hatchback and the Meteor 4-door sedan.

==== New Zealand ====
The Mk II Escort was introduced to New Zealand in early 1975, assembled at Ford's Seaview plant in Lower Hutt. Unlike the Australian models, the New Zealand Escort range followed the specifications of the British models, aside from the use of metric instrumentation. All bodystyles were assembled, including the estate – previously (in Mk I guise) a built-up import from the United Kingdom.

A large choice of models were available in the NZ Escort range, consisting of 1.1 L (base), 1.3 L (L, GL, 1300 Sport, estate and van variants) and 1.6 L (Ghia, 1600 Sport) variants – the 1.1 being aimed at budget conscious buyers, the 1.3 L models were popular, and the 1.6 L – which appeared in New Zealand production in 1976 – being reserved for 1600 Sport and Ghia models. A three-speed automatic transmission was available as an option for most 1.3- and 1.6-litre models.

Unlike Australia, and helped by restrictions on how many Japanese cars could be sold in New Zealand, the Escort and Cortina ranges sold well and often topped the car monthly sales lists. An update was given for the range for 1979, which notably involved the addition of the Ghia model, the adoption of the GL's square headlights on the lower end models, Ford blue oval badging, and sport wheels on the L and GL. For 1980, all Ghia models gained standard alloy wheels.

The production of British-sourced and New Zealand-assembled Escorts ended in late 1980. Ford dealers offered large price reductions to shift their remaining Mk II Escort stock when the model was replaced in New Zealand by the Ford Laser in May 1981, which was a badge engineered Mazda 323, available in sedan and hatchback forms.

=== Rest of the world ===
Israel

Assembly of the Mk II Escort commenced in August 1975. The Escort was a best-seller in the IsraelI market, its best year being 1976, when a total of 3,801 units were assembled. The line-up included 1.1- and 1.3-litre versions. Most were of the four-door variety, and only 150 were built as a 2-door 1.1L. Assembly ended after 12,700 units, in April 1981. No Ford passenger car was since then assembled in Israel.

South Africa

Escort Mark II shells built in Halewood, England were assembled in Struandale, Port Elizabeth, South Africa, from late 1975 until 1980. When originally launched, the Escort Mark II was sold as the 1300 L or as the 1600 GL, with two- or four-door bodywork. Aside from colour-coded hubcaps, most of the equipment differences were only on the inside with the GL being considerably better equipped. The GL also received square headlights, back-up lights, and body-side mouldings. The South African Escort received the 1.3-litre Kent engine with 42 kW (57 PS; 56 hp), while the 1.6 claimed 52 kW (71 PS; 70 hp). Early in 1979 the 1600 sport was launched, featuring a two-door bodyshell, revised gear ratios and a sporty look, using the 1600 motor proving to become a highly popular vehicle to the present day. The "One Six Double O" Sport was the best selling car in South Africa in 1980 at its retail price of R4995.00.

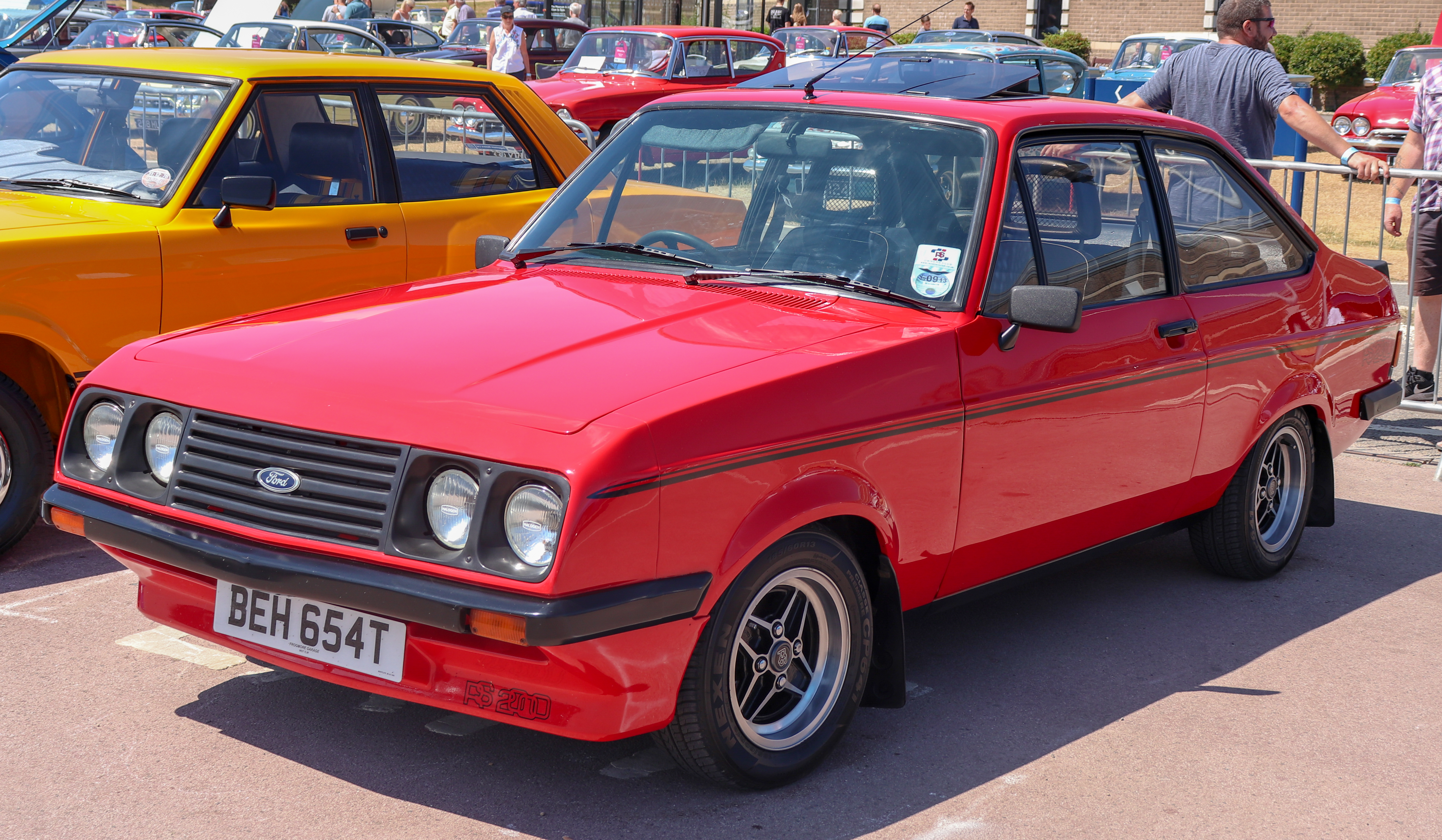
Ford Escort RS2000 2-door saloon

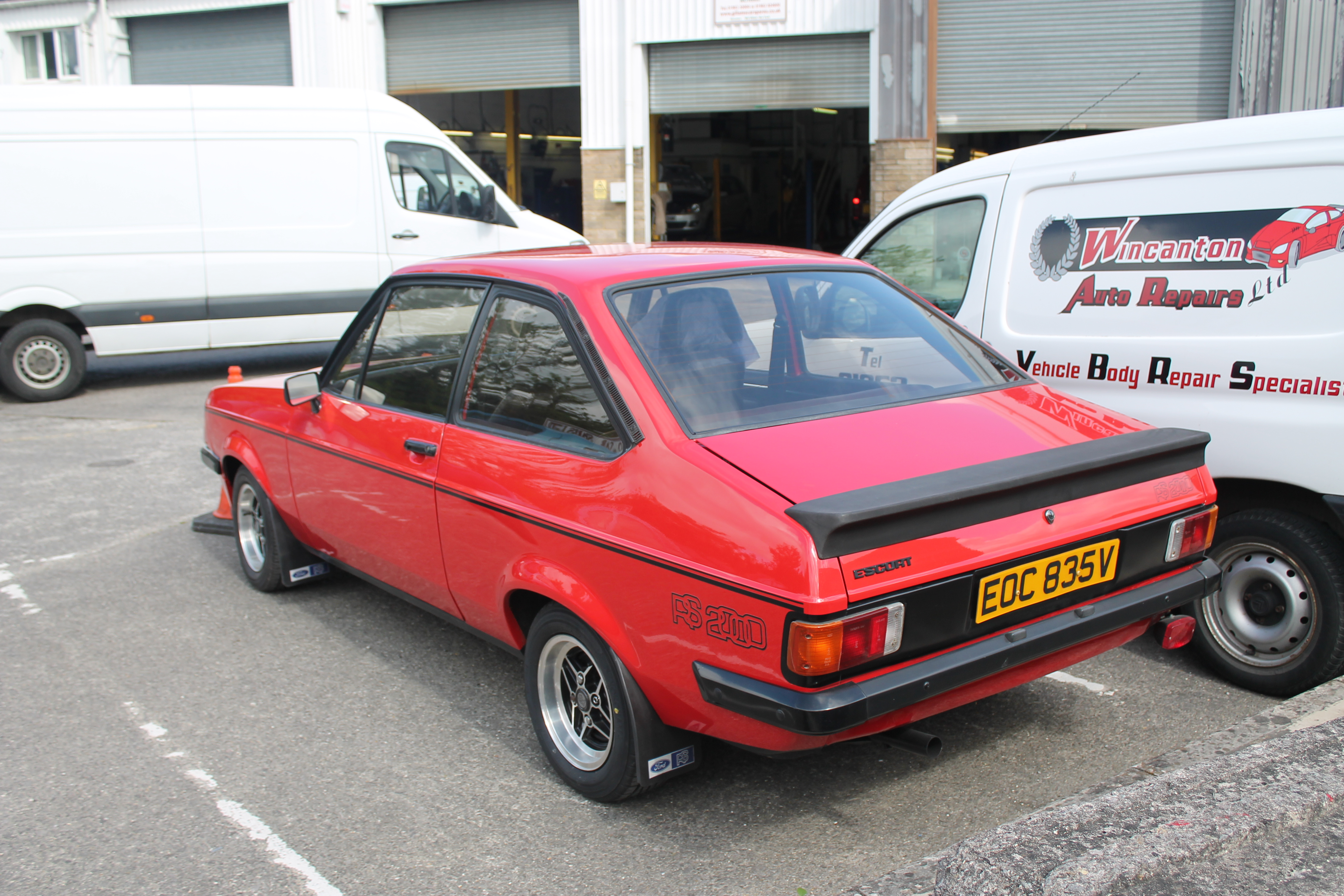
2-door saloon (RS)

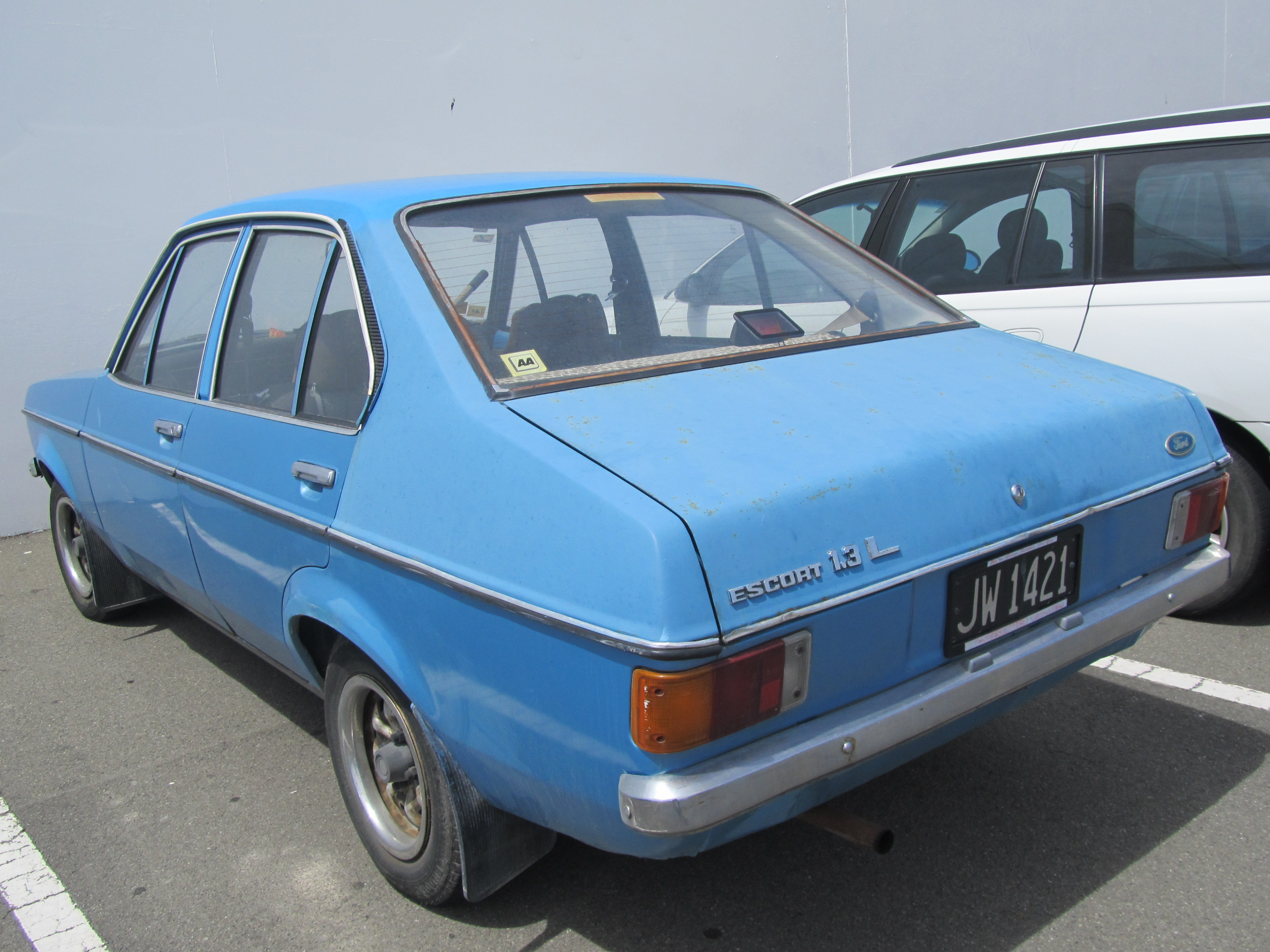
4-door saloon

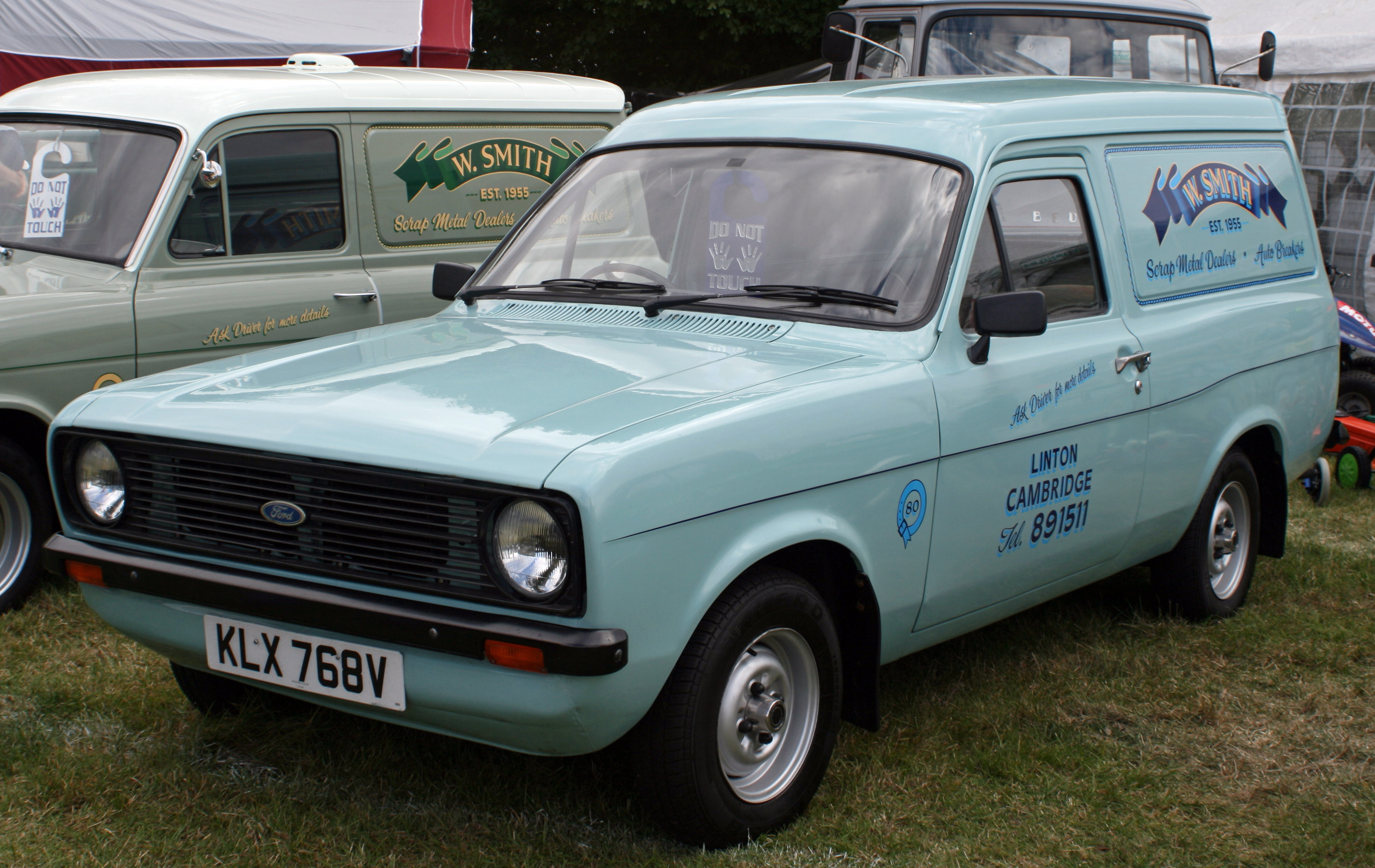
Van

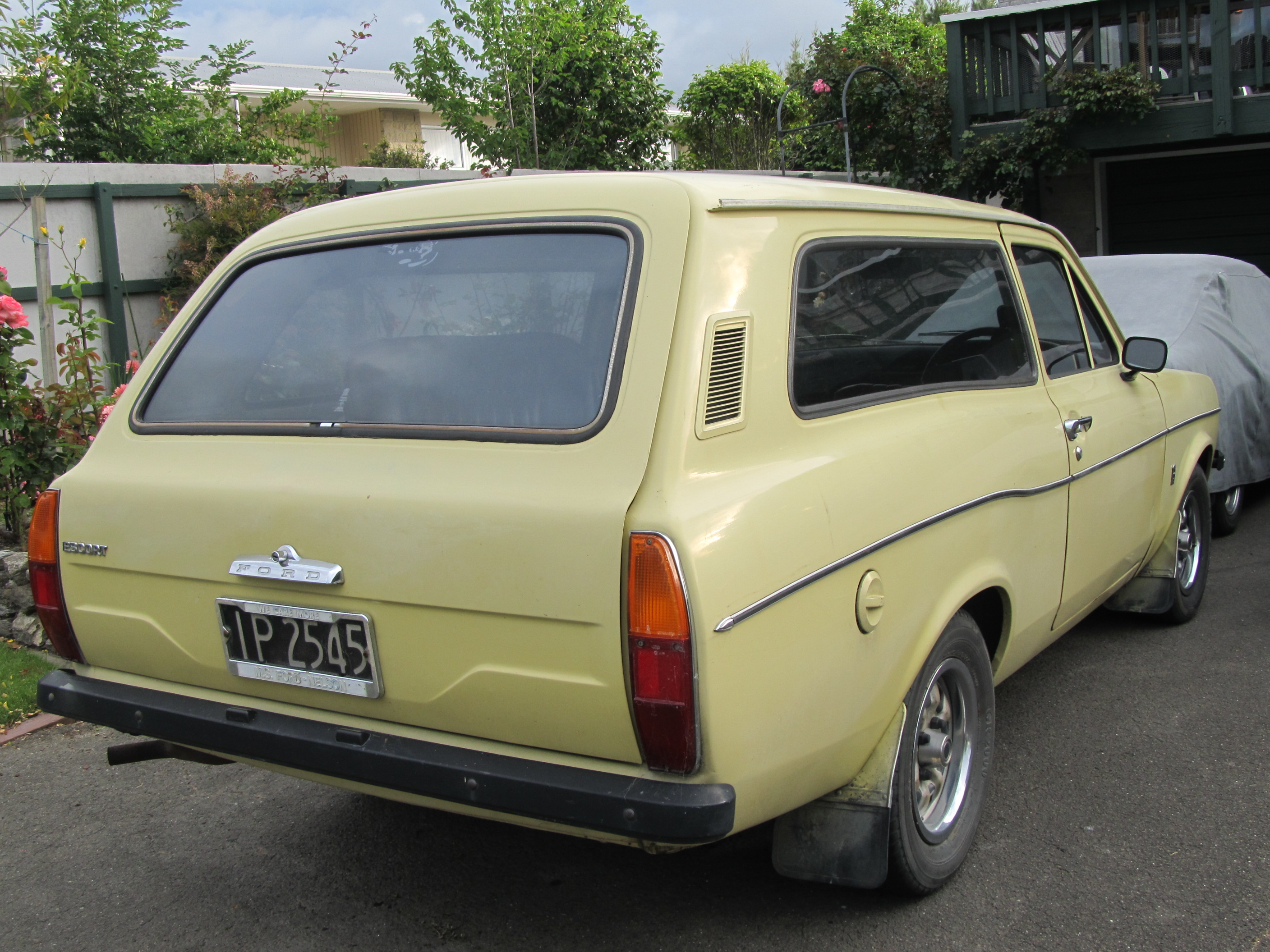
Estate

=== Rallying ===
As with its predecessor, the Mark II had a successful rallying career. All models of the Mark I were carried over to the Mark II, though the Mexico gained the RS badge and had its engine changed to a 1.6 L (1,593 cc) OHC Pinto instead of the OHV. A "Sport" model was also produced using the 1.6 L Crossflow. A new model was released, the RS1800, which had a naturally aspirated 1,833 cc (1.8 L; 111.9 cu in) Cosworth BDE DOHC 4 valves per cylinder with a 32/36 DGAV Weber carburetor inline-four engine, producing 117 PS (86 kW; 115 bhp) at 6000 rpm and 171 N⋅m (126 lb⋅ft) of torque at 3750 rpm. It was essentially a special created for rallying.

The works rally cars were highly specialised machines. Bodyshells were heavily strengthened and characterised by the wide wheelarch extensions, and fitment of four large spotlights for night stages. The Cosworth BDE engine was replaced with 2.0 L BDG and gave up to 250 bhp (186 kW; 253 PS) with Cosworth-made aluminium block by 1979. It was complemented by a strengthened transmission, five-speed straight-cut ZF gearbox, five-linked suspension and more minor modifications. The RS1800 was re-homologated with the aluminium block on 2 April 1977 as the 1975 cc Group-4 Escort RS. This was after the FIA removed the 100-off rule from Appendix J 1976 and banned modifications approved under the previous rules for groups 2 and 4, effective from the end of 1977.

The Mark II Escort continued its predecessor's run on the RAC Rally, winning every year from 1975 to 1979 and racing in a variety of other events around the world. In the 1979 season of the World Rally Championship, Björn Waldegård took the drivers' title, Hannu Mikkola was runner-up and Ari Vatanen finished the year in fifth place, all driving Escort RS1800s.

These drivers' successes throughout the year gave Ford the manufacturers' title, the only time the company had achieved this until the 2006 season, when Marcus Grönholm and Mikko Hirvonen won the title for Ford in Ford Focus RS WRC 06. Vatanen won the drivers' title in 1981, again at the wheel of an RS1800. This victory came despite the arrival on the WRC scene of the four-wheel drive Audi Quattro. Ford placed in the top three in the manufacturers' championship for the sixth year in a row.

The 2.0 L RS2000 version, with its distinctively slanted polyurethane nose, and featuring the Pinto engine from the Cortina, was announced in the UK in March 1975 and introduced in Germany in August 1975, being reportedly produced in both countries. It provided a claimed 110 bhp and a top speed of 110 mph (177 km/h). For acceleration to 100 km/h (62.5 mph) a time of 8.9 seconds was claimed by the manufacturers. The 2.0 L engine was also easily retro-fitted into the Mark I, along with the Ford Sierra's five-speed gearbox, for rallying and other sports.

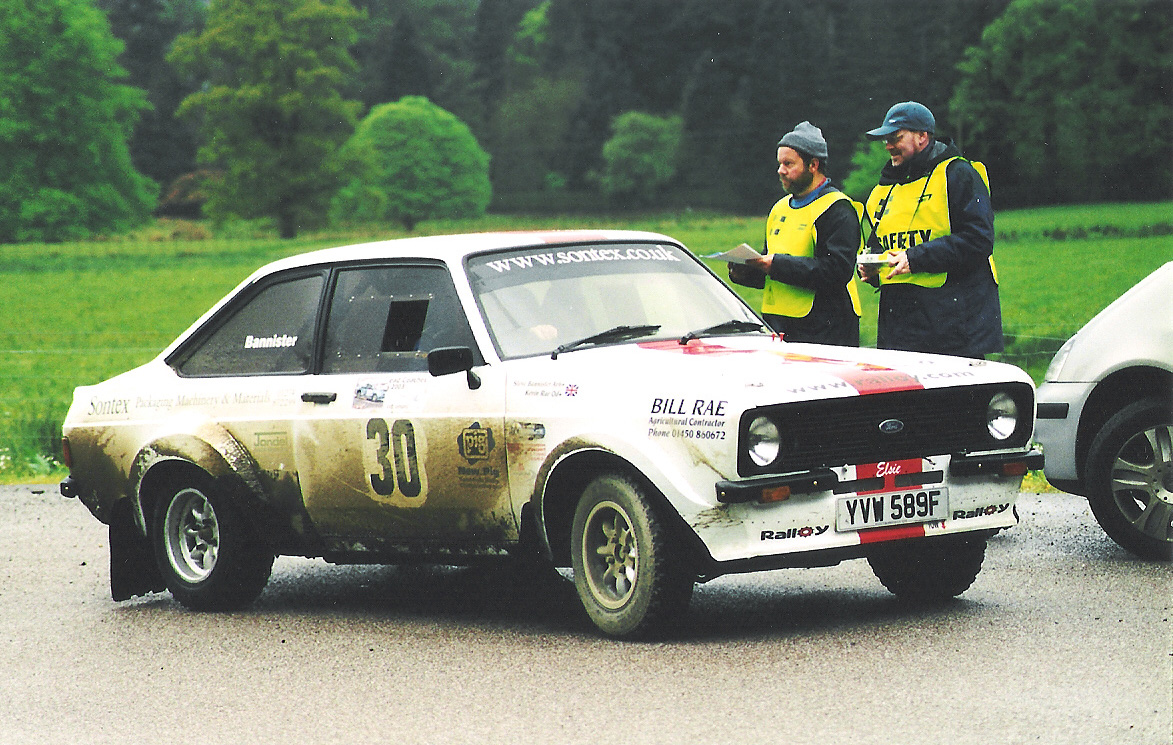
A Mark II rally car at a stage rally time control, displaying the extended wheel arches

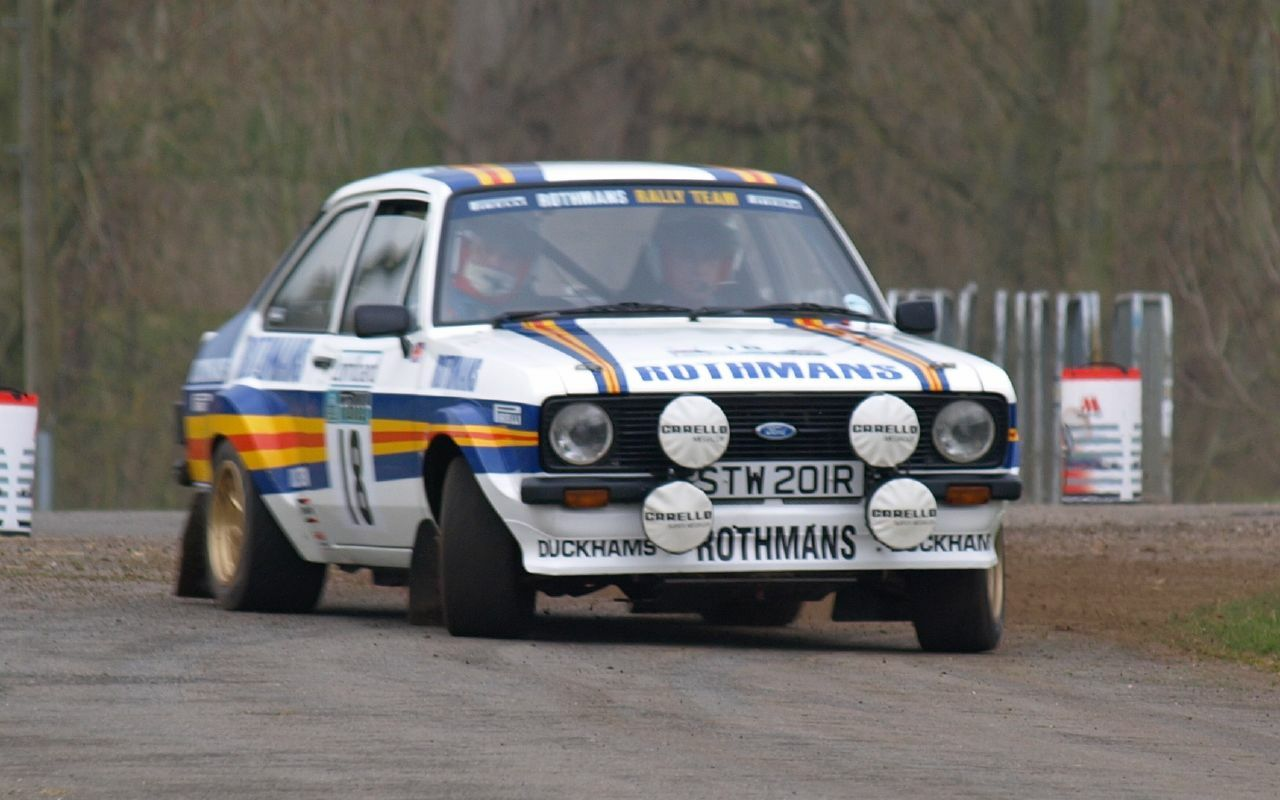
Ford Escort RS1800 driven at the Race Retro 2008 by Alan Watkins

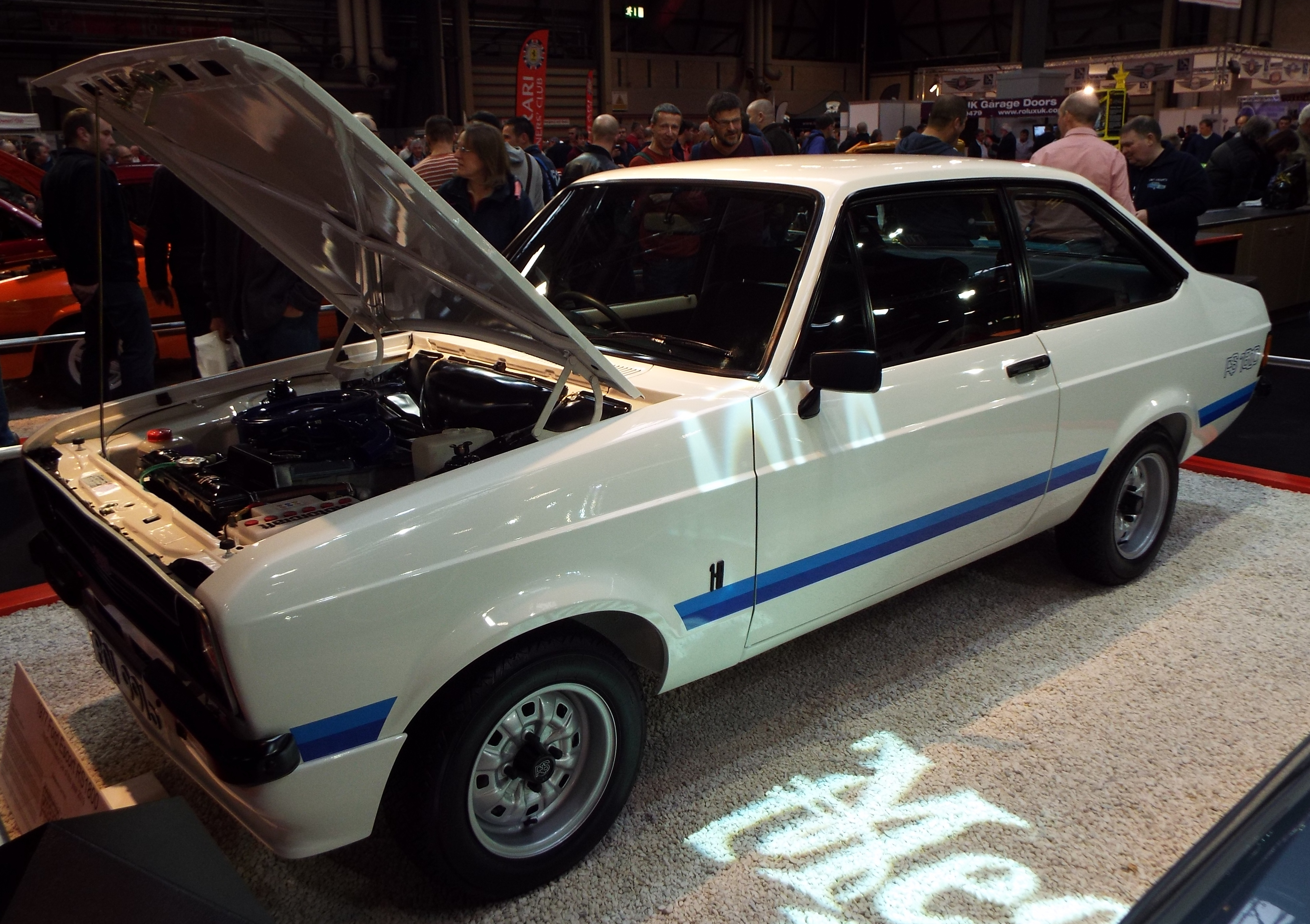
Ford Escort RS1800 with open bonnet

==== World Rally Championship - round victories ====
No.	Event	Season	Driver	Co-driver	Car
1	24th Lombard RAC Rally	1975	Timo Mäkinen	Henry Liddon	Ford Escort RS1800
2	25th Lombard RAC Rally	1976	Roger Clark	Stuart Pegg	Ford Escort RS1800
3	25th Safari Rally	1977	Björn Waldegård	Hans Thorszelius	Ford Escort RS1800
4	24th Acropolis Rally	1977	Björn Waldegård	Hans Thorszelius	Ford Escort RS1800
5	27th 1000 Lakes Rally	1977	Kyösti Hämäläinen	Martti Tiukkanen	Ford Escort RS1800
6	26th Lombard RAC Rally	1977	Björn Waldegård	Hans Thorszelius	Ford Escort RS1800
7	13th Arctic Rally	1978	Ari Vatanen	David Richards	Ford Escort RS1800
8	28th International Swedish Rally	1978	Björn Waldegård	Hans Thorszelius	Ford Escort RS1800
9	19th Esso-Lombard Scottish Rally	1978	Hannu Mikkola	Arne Hertz	Ford Escort RS1800
10	9th Motogard Rally of New Zealand	1978	Russell Brookes	Peter Bryant	Ford Escort RS1800
11	27th Lombard RAC Rally	1978	Hannu Mikkola	Arne Hertz	Ford Escort RS1800
12	13º Rallye de Portugal Vinho do Porto	1979	Hannu Mikkola	Arne Hertz	Ford Escort RS1800
13	26th Acropolis Rally	1979	Björn Waldegård	Hans Thorszelius	Ford Escort RS1800
14	10th Motogard Rally of New Zealand	1979	Hannu Mikkola	Arne Hertz	Ford Escort RS1800
15	7ème Critérium Molson du Québec	1979	Björn Waldegård	Hans Thorszelius	Ford Escort RS1800
16	28th Lombard RAC Rally	1979	Hannu Mikkola	Arne Hertz	Ford Escort RS1800
17	27th Acropolis Rally	1980	Ari Vatanen	David Richards	Ford Escort RS1800
18	28th Acropolis Rally	1981	Ari Vatanen	David Richards	Ford Escort RS1800
19	3º Marlboro Rallye do Brasil	1981	Ari Vatanen	David Richards	Ford Escort RS1800
20	31st 1000 Lakes Rally	1981	Ari Vatanen	David Richards	Ford Escort RS1800

== Third generation (1980) ==
Third generation
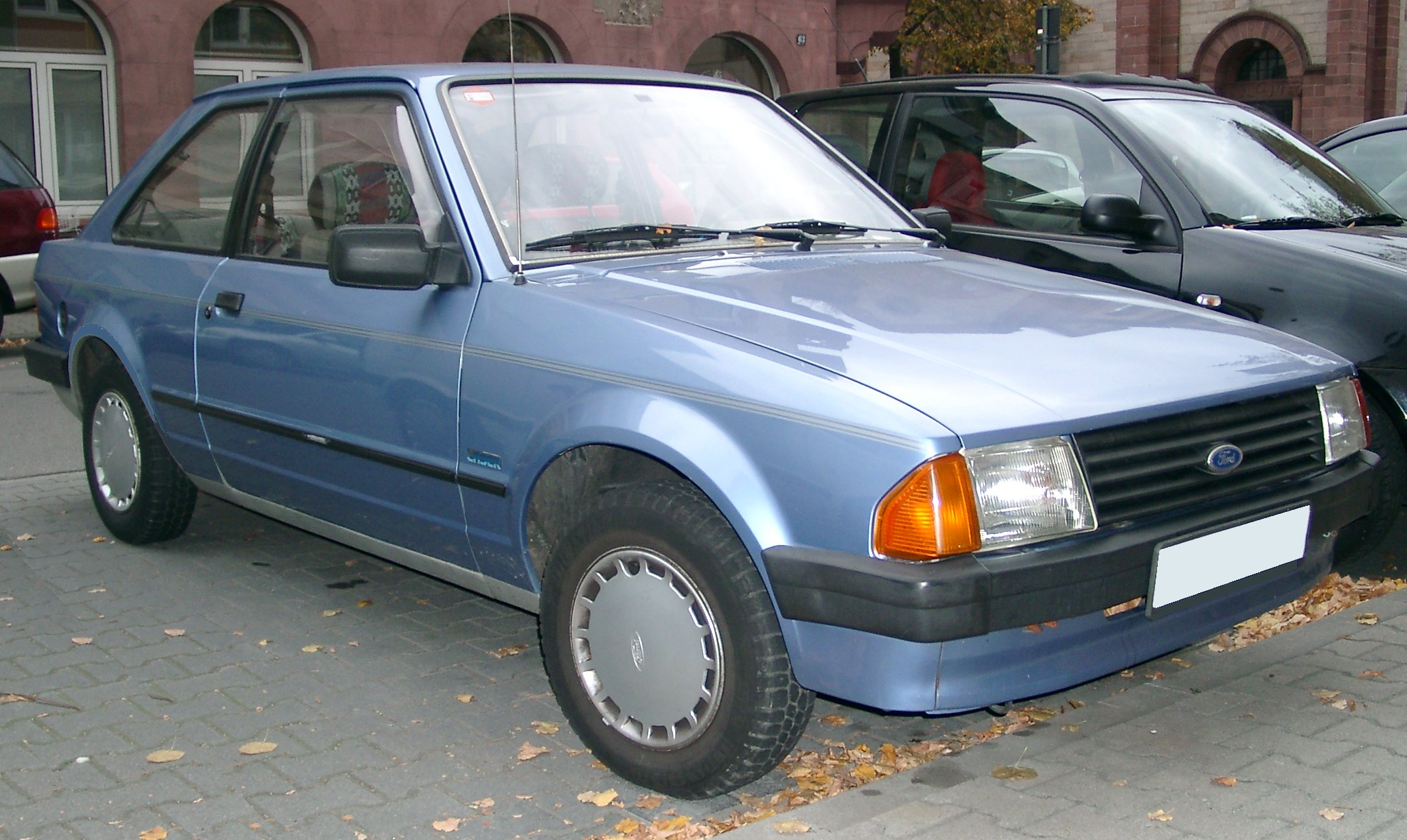

Overview
- Production: September 1980 – February 1986
- Assembly: United Kingdom: Halewood (Halewood Body & Assembly); Spain: Almussafes; Germany: Saarlouis (Ford Germany); Brazil: São Bernardo do Campo (Ford Brazil); South Africa: Struandale, Port Elizabeth (FMCSA); South Africa: Silverton, Pretoria (Samcor)
- Designer: Uwe Bahnsen; Patrick Le Quément

Body and chassis
- Body style: 3/5-door liftback; 3/5-door estate; 2-door cabriolet; 3-door van
- Layout: Front-engine, front-wheel-drive
- Related: Ford Orion Mark I (1983–1986)

Powertrain
- Engine: petrol: 1117 cc Valencia I4; 1117 cc CVH I4 (1982 only); 1296 cc CVH I4; 1596 cc CVH I4; 1596 cc CVH turbo I4; diesel: 1608 cc LT I4 (1984–1986)
- Transmission: 4-speed BC4 manual; 5-speed BC5 manual; 3-speed ATX automatic

Dimensions
- Wheelbase: 2,393 mm (94.2 in)
- Length: Hatchback: 3,907 mm (153.8 in); Estate: 4,033 mm (158.8 in)
- Width: 1,640 mm (64.6 in)
- Height: 1,400 mm (55.1 in)

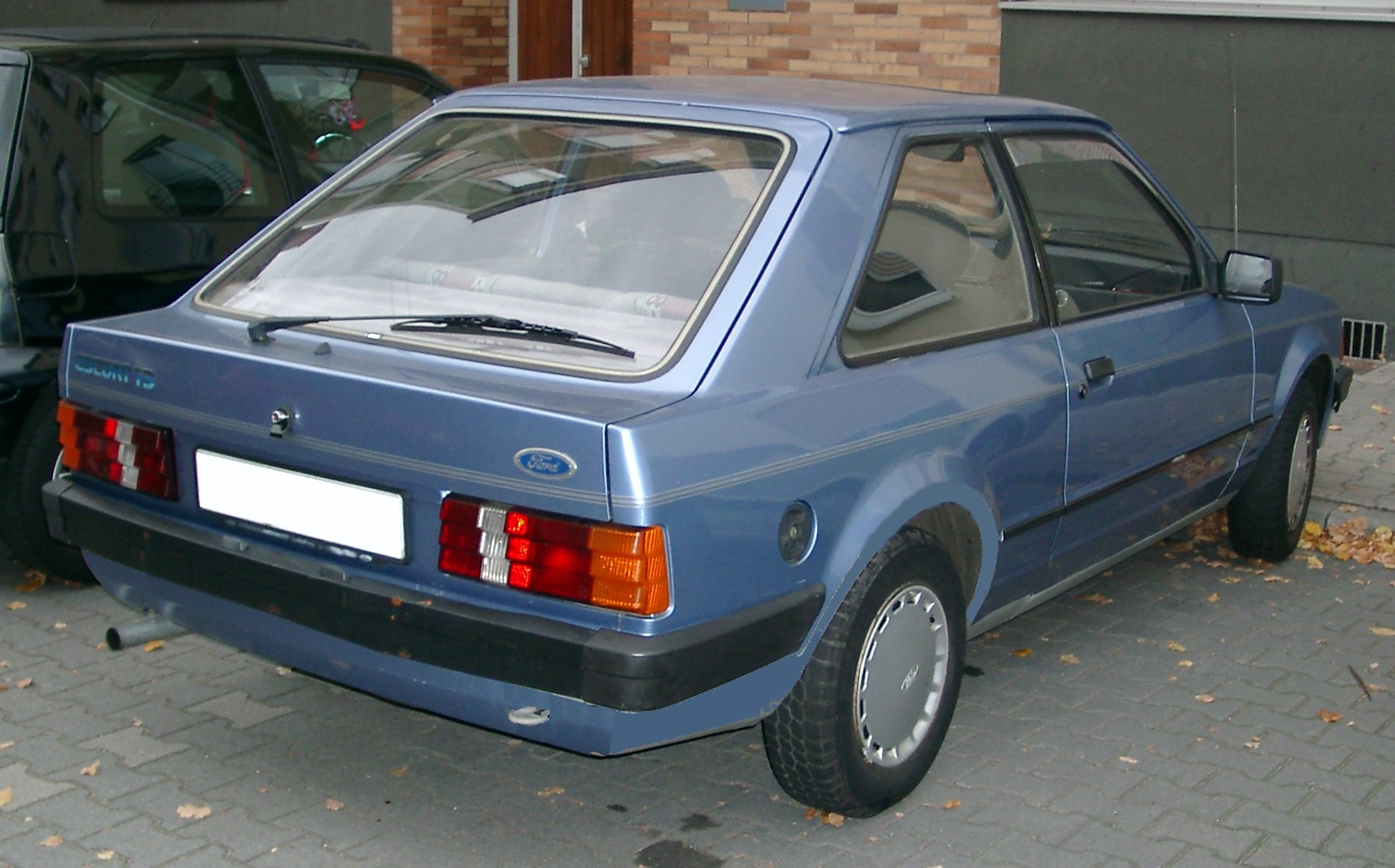
3-door hatchback

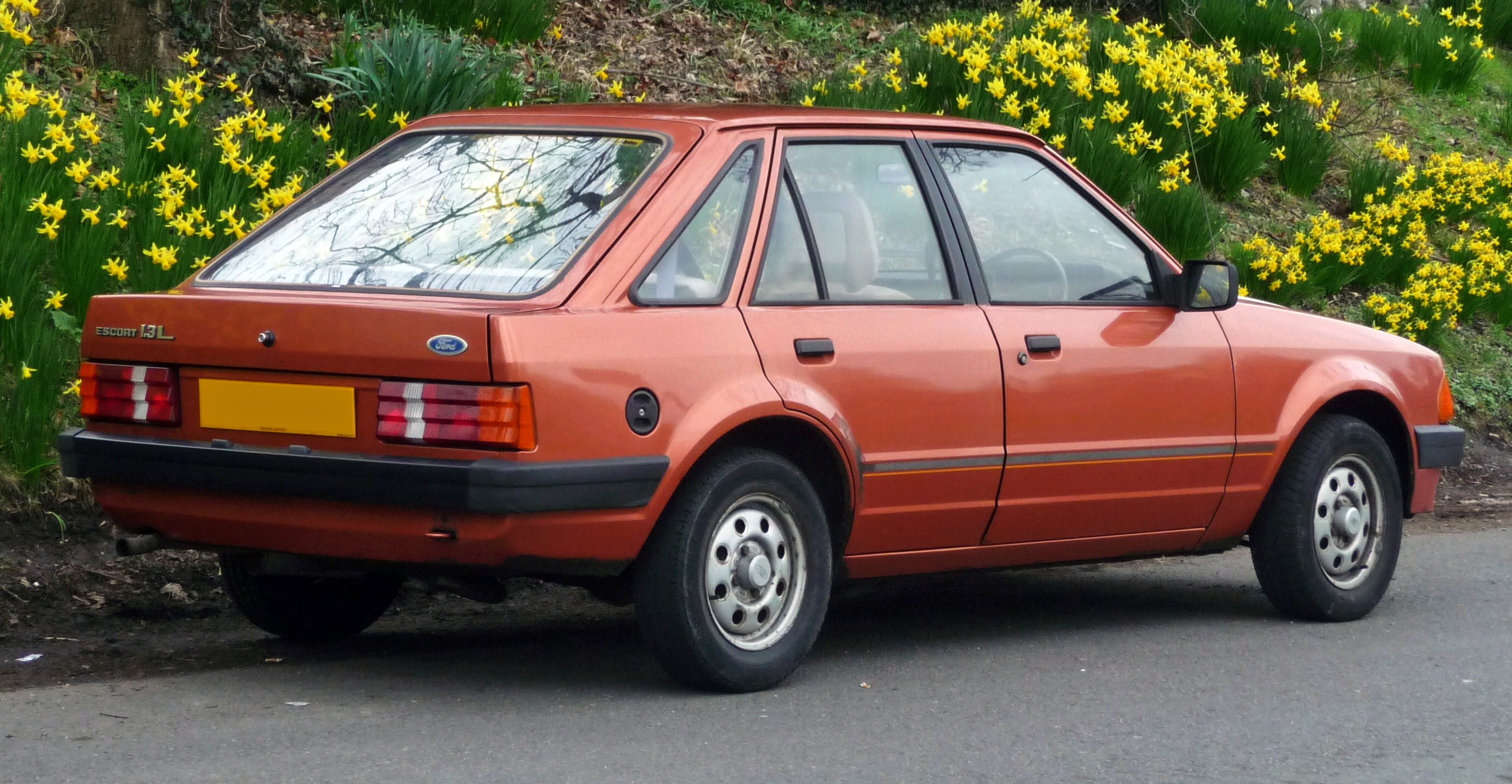
5-door hatchback

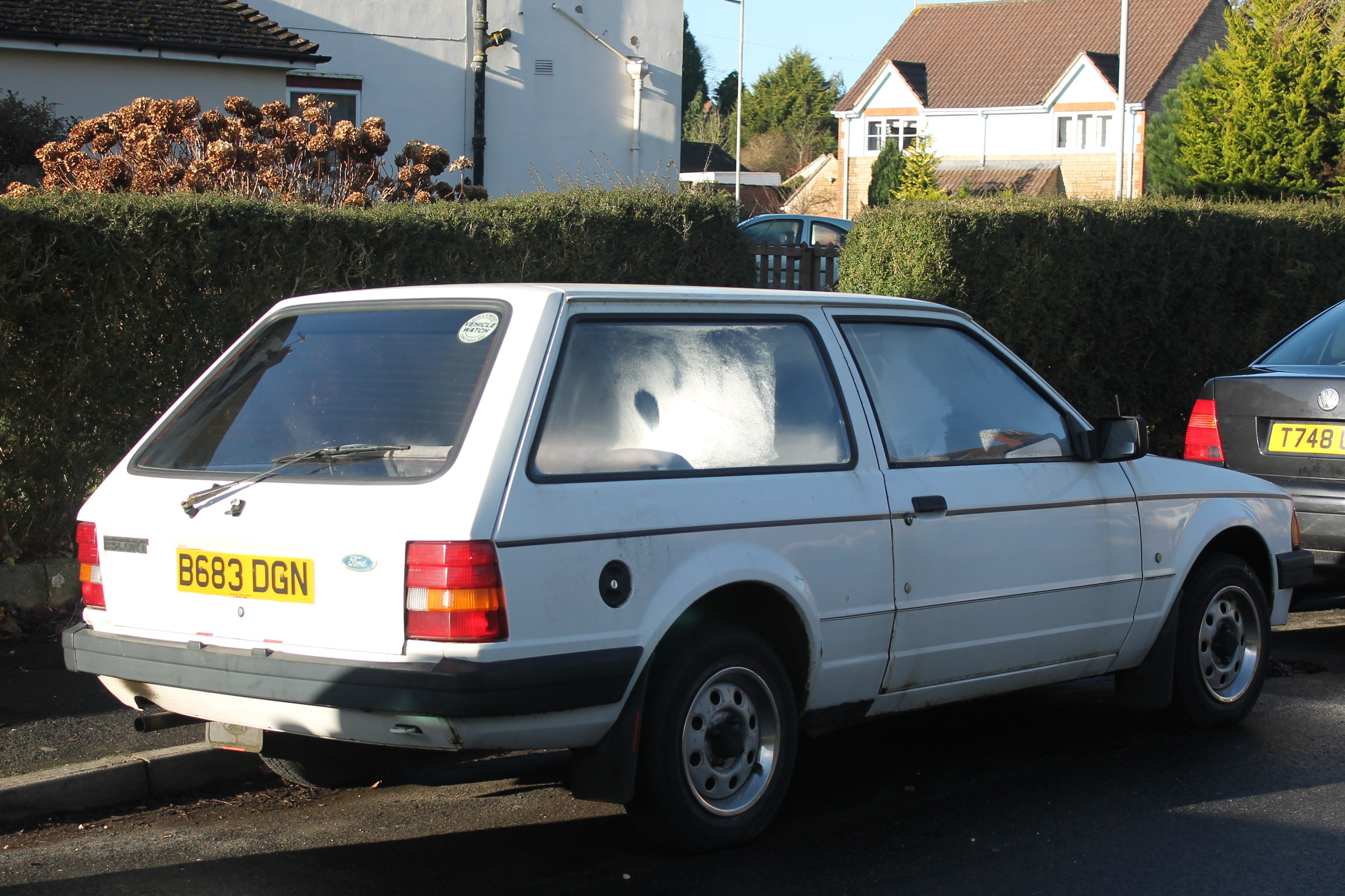
3-door estate

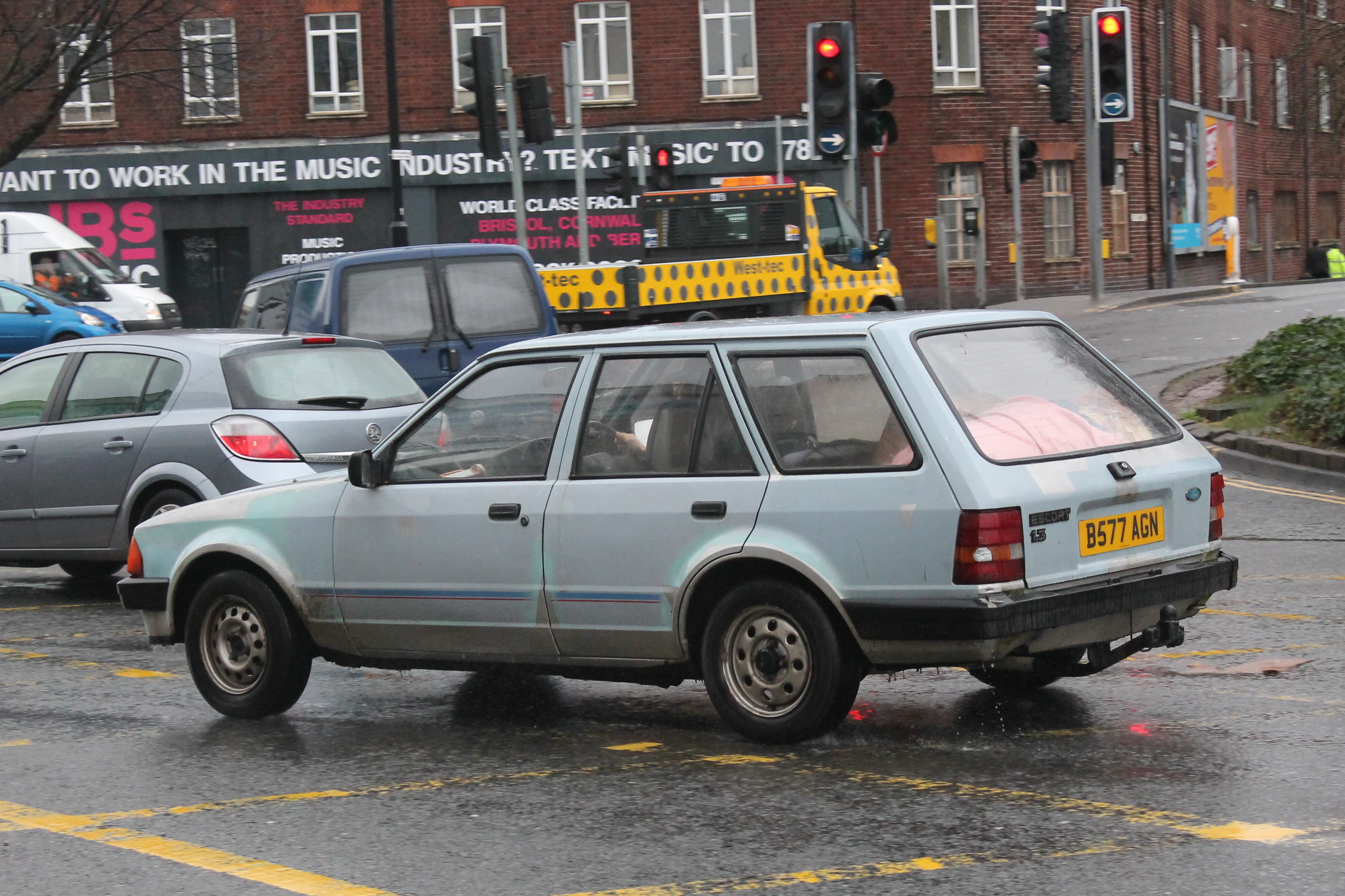
5-door estate

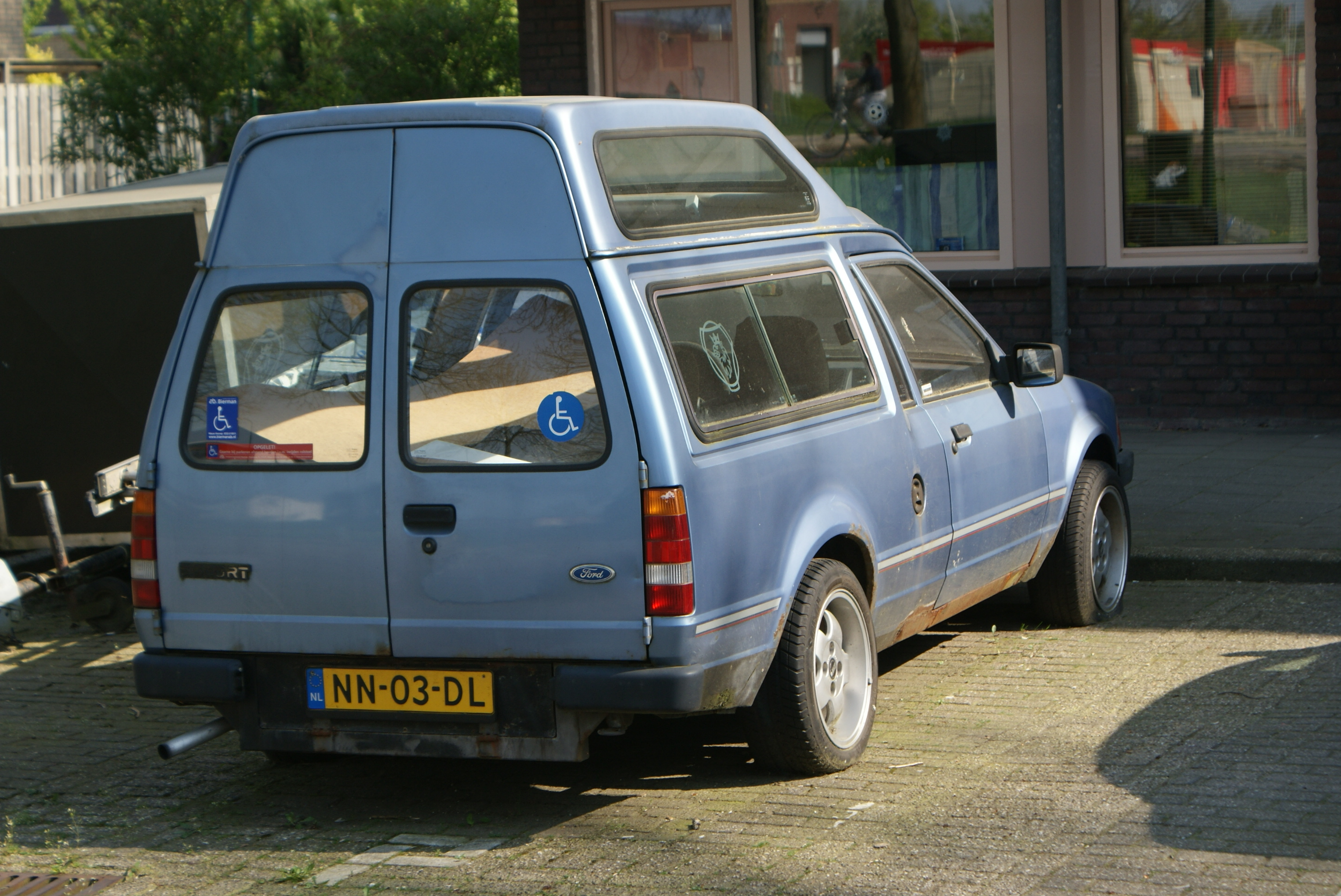
2-door wheelchair accessible van

Codenamed "Erika", the third-generation Escort was launched in September 1980. Development work had effectively begun even before the MkII's launch in 1974 with the start of the CVH engine programme, with the final exterior styling and interior design being signed off in late 1977. The North American Escort introduced at this time was a distantly related derivative. Sales in the United Kingdom increased, and by 1982, it had overtaken the ageing Cortina as the nation's best-selling car, staying at the top spot for eight years.

Unlike the Mark II, which had essentially been a reskin of the original 1968 platform, the Mark III was a completely new design, and was conceived as a hi-tech, high-efficiency vehicle which would compete with the Volkswagen Golf and Honda Civic – considered at the time the class benchmarks. The Mark III was therefore a major engineering and stylistic departure from the two previous models; the biggest changes being the adoption of front-wheel drive, the new hatchback body and the all-new CVH overhead camshaft engines. The suspension was fully independent all around, departing from the archaic leaf spring arrangement found on its predecessors and the bodyshell was on average, 75 kg lighter than that of the Mk II, yet Ford claimed was stiffer than the outgoing car. Ford however, was conscious that loyal customers of the previous generation Escorts may be deterred by the Mk III's advanced design, and hence the car was marketed in the United Kingdom with the strapline "Simple is Efficient". The major changes to the Escort mirrored that of its General Motors contemporary launched just months before – the Opel Kadett D (Vauxhall Astra Mk I) – which had also changed to an advanced front wheel drive hatchback from the rear wheel drive sedan architecture of its predecessor.

It was Ford of Europe's third front-wheel drive model launch, the second being the smaller Fiesta in 1976, and the first being the 1962 German Taunus 12M (P4). The car used Ford's contemporary design language of the period with the black louvred radiator grille and straked rear lamp clusters, as well as introducing the aerodynamic "bustle-back" bootlid stump (trademarked by Ford as Aeroback) which would be further developed in the forthcoming Sierra and Scorpio; the stump was proven to reduce the car's aerodynamic drag co-efficient significantly, which was a class-leading 0.38 at launch.

New were the overhead camshaft CVH engines in 1.3 L and 1.6 L formats, with the older Ford Kent-based "Valencia" engine from the Fiesta powering the 1.1 L derivative, although there was a short-lived 1.1 version of the CVH engine sold in certain markets before it was discontinued in 1982.

The Escort Mark III was voted European Car of the Year in 1981, fighting off stiff competition from Italy's Fiat Panda and British Leyland's Austin Metro.

From launch, the car was available in base (Popular), L, GL, Ghia and XR3 trim. As was common for Ford during this period, there were different dashboard mouldings for "high" and "low" series trim levels. GL and above models had a slush-moulded dashboard with 'soft feel' covering, and faux chrome embellishment. Base and L specification models had a 'hard feel' injection moulded dashboard with fewer holes for switches – the base dashboard was a sub-variation of this which omitted the centre air vents, glovebox, side demister vents and speaker grille and only a two-position blower fan switch. These lead-in models were extremely basic even for their time; in addition to the aforementioned dashboard, they came with just partial door cards with no armrests, vinyl seats (cloth was an optional extra), and no rear parcel tray or push button tailgate release. Consequently, these models sold very poorly and most buyers opted for at least the L specification.

From mid-1982, a five-speed manual gearbox was introduced across the range. This was now standard on the 1.6 L versions and could be specified as an option on most 1.3 L engines. A selection of features was available, either as standard fitment or optional extras depending on model, including a tilt-and-slide sunroof, central locking, and electric windows. All models except for base and L were fitted with a check-light system for low fuel, low oil, low coolant, low screenwash, and worn out brake pads. Power steering was not available on European Escorts although it was available on the US Escort. The 1983 model year saw the Ford ATX three-speed automatic transmission (developed primarily for the US version) becoming available on the 1.6 L engine, and the base models now had cloth seat trim as standard.

The Escort estate was initially only available with three doors, but a five-door version was introduced in 1983. In the same year, a saloon version of the Escort, the Orion, was launched. It used the same mechanicals as the hatchback, but had a more upmarket image and was not available with the smaller 1.1 L engine. It was also directed at buyers of the earlier Cortina, which had ceased production in 1982, with its Sierra successor not available as a saloon at the time.

However, the car attracted criticism from the motoring press at launch due to its suspension, with positive camber on the front wheels and negative camber at the rear, giving rise to the Mark III's infamous "knock-kneed" stance. The Mark III soon had a reputation for a harsh, unforgiving ride. In September 1983, the revised suspension mounts from the Escort-based Orion and the larger Sierra steering rack were introduced as running changes for the 1984 model year which also coincided with other minor upgrades across the range, which included revised trim and steering wheels, new style badging and improved sound systems across the range, whilst the austere base models were finally given the "L" specification dashboard and improved seat trim.

Another engine, introduced in August 1983, was the diesel engine. Developed in Dagenham, it was remarkably economical for its time, and still is to this day, managing over 70 mpg. It was available on the L and GL models. However, the performance was worse than the 1.1 L petrol version, with only 54 bhp (40 kW; 55 PS) and a top speed of barely 90 mph (140 km/h) – which prompted Ford to eventually enlarge the engine to 1.8 L some years later in the MK4 Escort.

The Mk III Escort (1980–1986), was the most common type of car on British roads in December 1989, with almost 1,500,000 examples registered.

A convertible version, made by coachbuilder Karmann, appeared the same year as the five-door estate (1983). It was the first drop-top car produced by Ford Europe since the Corsair of the 1960s. The Escort Cabriolet was initially available in both XR3i and Ghia specification, badged as 1.6i and 1.6 respectively (XR3i and Ghia badging would not appear on convertibles until after 1986), but the Ghia variant was later dropped.

=== Origin of the "Erika" codename ===
The origins of the codename "Erika" for the Escort Mk III is now subject to dispute – the most likely being Ford of Europe policy in the late 1970s for using female names for new projects such as "Brenda" (Escort Mk II), "Gloria" (Granada MkII), "Carla" (Capri MkIII), "Teresa" (Taunus TC3/Cortina Mk5) and "Toni" (Sierra). It was known that Henry Ford II's secretary's name during his tenure as CEO of Ford Europe was Erika, and it has been suggested in some sources that the name came from here. Other theories being that the Escort was originally meant to be called the "Ford Erika", but ended up retaining the Escort name. Some say this was due to British consumers' reluctance to let go of the "Escort" badge (as the first two generations of Escort had been among Britain's most popular cars, with the Mk II being Britain's best selling car in 1976), and some say that the Germans were concerned with the song Erika, which was a famous battlemarch of the German armed forces during World War II.

=== Sporting models ===
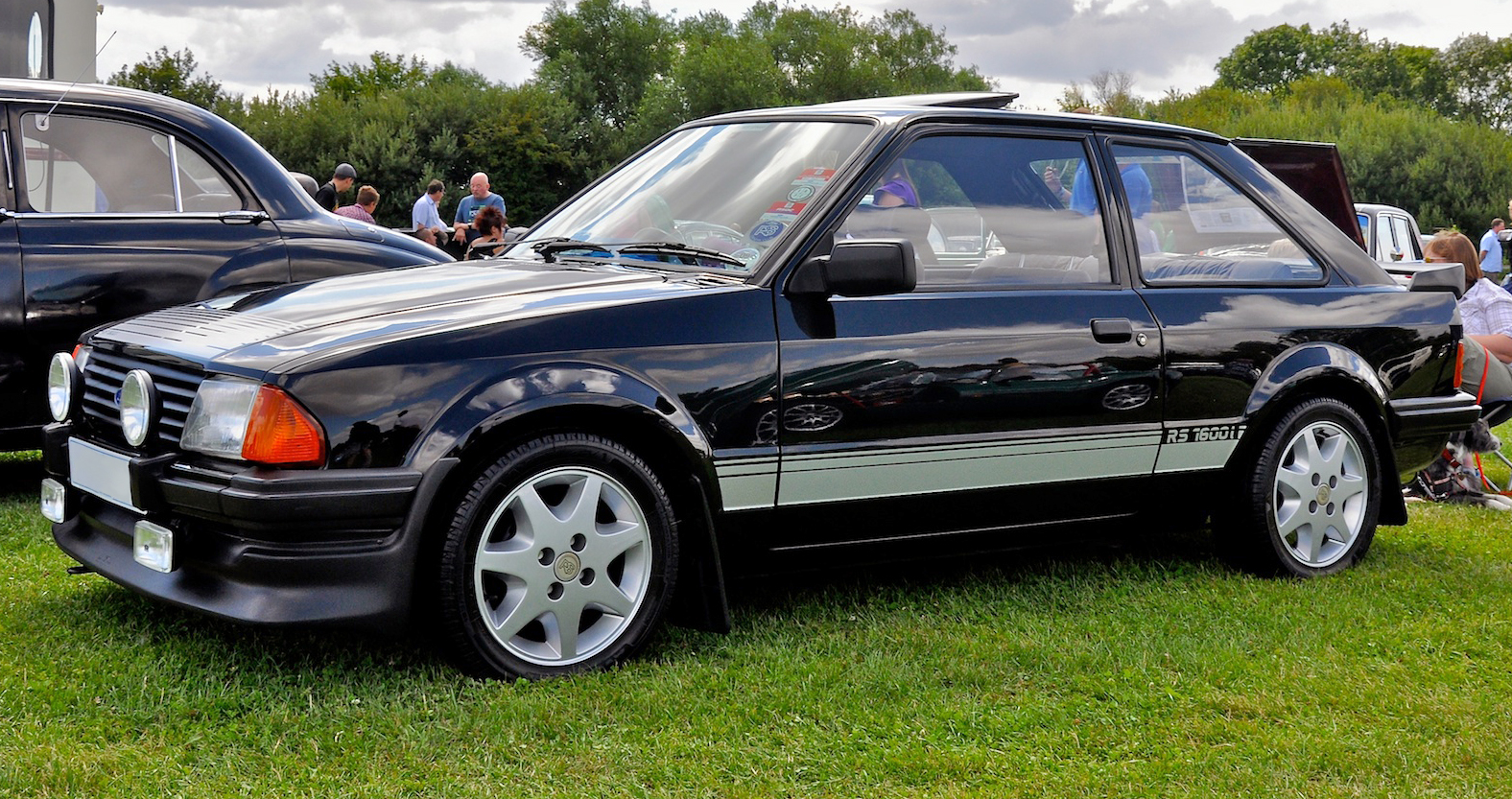
Ford Escort RS 1600i

To compete with Volkswagen's Golf GTI, a hot hatch version of the Mark III was developed – the XR3. Initially this featured a tuned version of the 1.6 L CVH engine fitted with a twin-choke Weber carburettor, uprated suspension and numerous cosmetic alterations. It lacked a five-speed transmission and fuel injection. Fuel injection finally arrived in October 1982 (creating the XR3i), eight months behind the limited edition (8,659 examples), racetrack-influenced RS 1600i. The Cologne-developed RS received a more powerful engine with 115 PS (85 kW), thanks to computerized ignition and a modified head as well as the fuel injection.

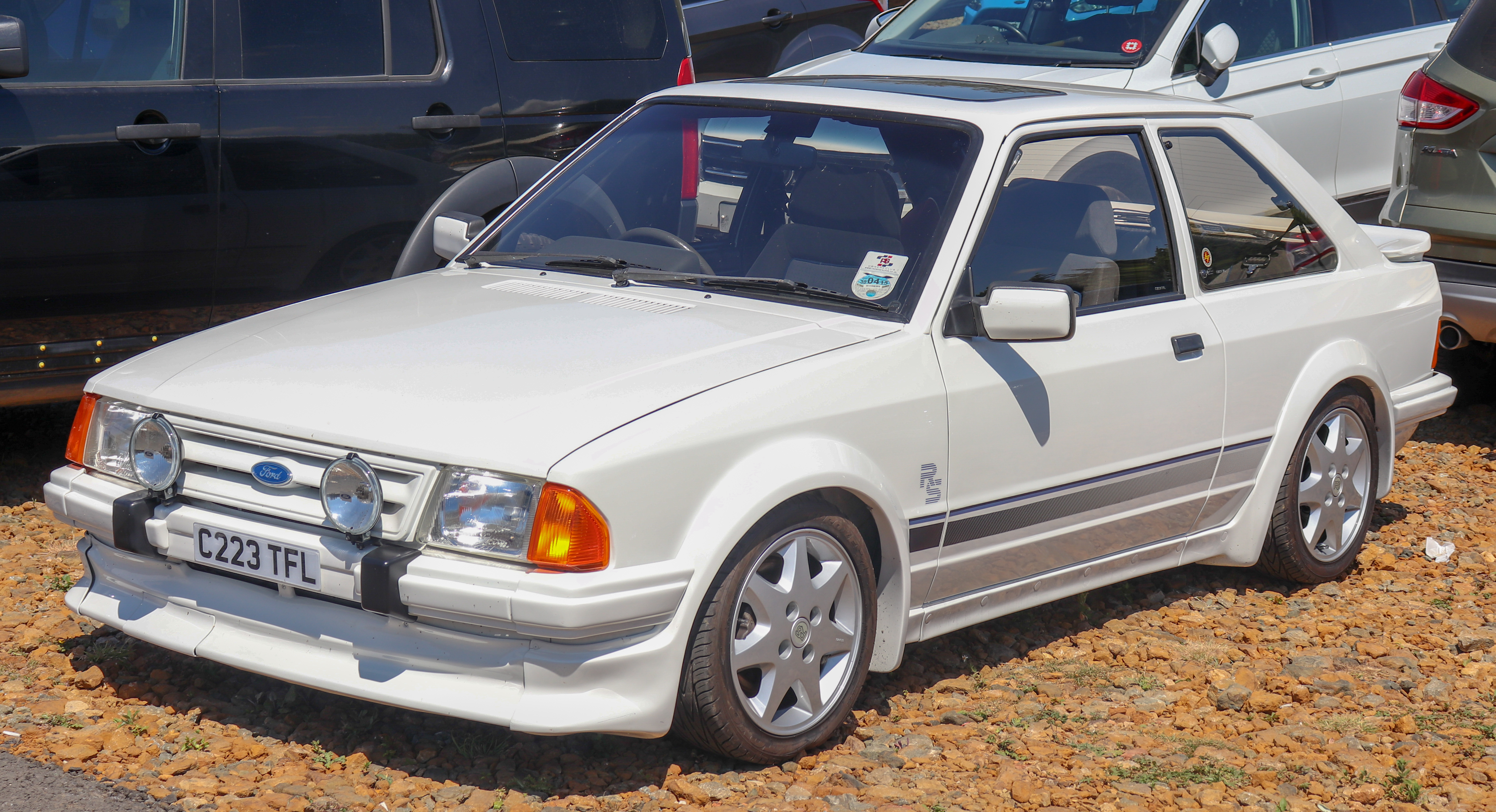
Ford Escort RS Turbo Series 1

The final performance update arrived in the form of the turbocharged 132 PS (97 kW) RS Turbo model in October 1984. The RS Turbo was somewhat of a disappointment; it had been delayed several times and when it went on sale in early 1985, the chassis came in for severe criticism. Ford initially planned to build 5,000 RS Turbos, the minimum number required for homologation in Group A. However a total of 8,604 were built due to increased demand, almost all in Diamond White. Produced in both LHD and RHD, it was only marketed in a few European nations with 5,000 examples for the UK, and was only sold through official Rallye Sport dealers. They were well equipped, with the alloy wheels from the limited production RS 1600i, Recaro seats, and a viscous-coupling limited-slip differential. Only three cars were finished in black; one of them built especially for Lady Diana. The Series 2 RS Turbo continued with the 1986 MKIV model.

==== RS 1700T ====
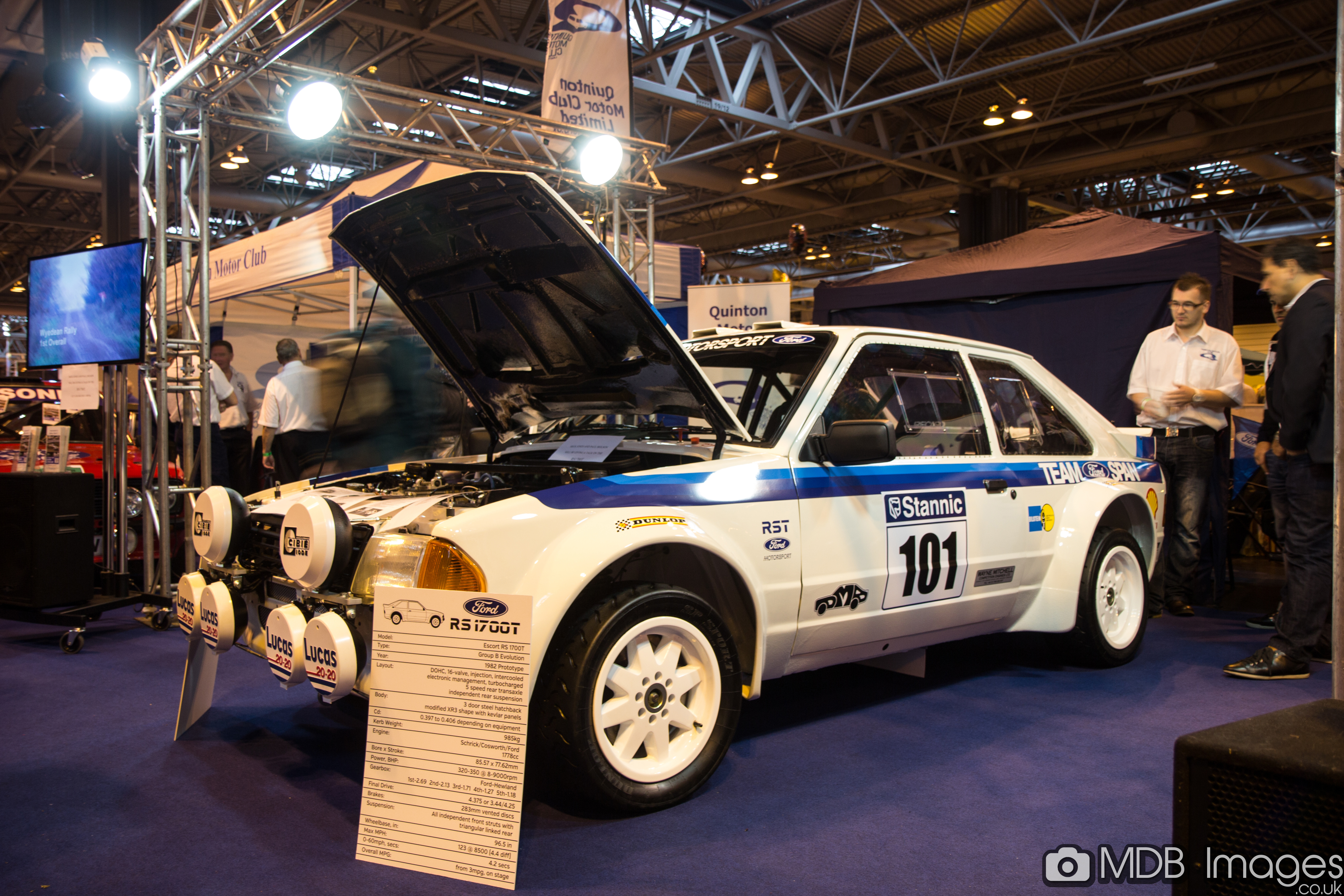
RS 1700T at 2014 NEC Classic Motor Show

Ford were initially keen that the Escort Mk III continued the strong rallying heritage of its two predecessors. The Ford Escort RS 1700T was a prototype RWD car designed by Ford Motor Company in 1980 to compete in Group B rallying. Prototypes were based on the Mk III Escort bodyshell, but other than this had almost no engineering commonality with the regular production version, being rear wheel drive and featuring a Cosworth developed 1.8-litre turbocharged four-cylinder engine that produced over 300 bhp (224 kW) maximum power. Also a prototype with a 2.4 litre Hart engine (derived from a Formula Two unit) was tested in 1982.

Persistent problems during the vehicle's development, coupled with unease within the marketing department that a Mk III Escort with rear wheel drive would be perceived as a retrograde step and prompted Ford to drop plans for its production and instead begin work on a bespoke all-wheel-drive model to beat the Audi Quattro, designed and built from scratch, resulting in the RS200.

=== Commercial models ===
The two-door Escort Van was first sold in February 1981, a slightly delayed introduction caused by large remaining stocks of the Mark II Escort Van. The Van has twin rear doors and unusual small side windows behind the front doors, necessary to provide more over-the-shoulder visibility which would otherwise be limited by the use of the short front doors from the five-door Escort. The main engineering change was to the rear suspension – namely the use of a solid beam axle on leaf springs in place of the fully independent set-up found on the hatchback and estate. At launch, the Mk3 van was available in two versions – 3.5cwt capacity (with the 1.3 engine) and 5.5cwt capacity (with the 1.6 engine). Both versions were offered in two trim levels – standard and "L", which mirrored the base and L models of the cars.

For the 1984 model year the engines options were revised with the 55cwt version now available with either the 1.3 CVH petrol or 1.6 diesel, whilst the 35cwt version reduced to 1.1 Valencia power. Equipment levels were improved slightly, with the standard van now gaining the better "L" spec dashboard with an opening glovebox, centre air vents and 3-speed blower fan.

Encouraged by the success of recreational vans in Europe such as the Matra Rancho, Ford toyed with a concept "XRV" version of the van, which used the XR3's uprated engine and a fully trimmed interior, but decided against putting it into production.

Derived from the van was a pickup version of the Escort, the Bantam, which was produced in South Africa.

=== Latin America ===
The Escort entered production in Brazil in July 1983, with either three or five doors. To better deal with the tropical heat, the Brazilian three-door Escort received swing-out rear windows, unlike their European counterparts. It was equipped with the Renault-based Ford CHT engine, of either 1341 or 1555 cc. Both size engines were also available in alcohol-fuelled versions with marginally more power. It was originally available in base (Popular), L or GL trim levels, with four- or five-speed manual transmissions. In October 1983, the luxurious Ghia version was added.

This model was exported to Sweden, Finland, Denmark and Norway from 1983 until 1986, as the Escort LX, where it replaced the low priced German-built Escort L. The car had a bad reputation in Scandinavia, with severe rust problems and issues with the wet liners of the Renault-designed engine. The engines were also designed to run on petrol containing some ethanol (10–20%), leading to troubles when using straight petrol. That problem could be avoided by adding ethanol in the petrol manually. The Brazilian Escort LX was also available in Switzerland, only with the larger engine option.

Brazil also received an XR3 version towards the very end of 1983, only available with a tuned version of the 1.6-liter engine running on alcohol. Aside from interior and exterior enhancements including spoilers and 14-inch alloy wheels, the XR3's engine produced 82.9 CV (61 kW), a bit more than the regular versions but not quite enough to be considered a sporting car. In April 1985, the Escort Cabriolet was introduced. It was built in Brazil in collaboration between Ford and Karmann, with the top imported from Germany.

=== South Africa ===
The Escort was also available in South Africa, as hatchback only, from March 1981, with the 1.3 and 1.6 litre engines. The South African Escorts differ only slightly from European ones, as a result of local parts content regulations. The XR3 was also sold, known simply as the Ford XR3 and later XR3i, rather than the Ford Escort XR3.

== Fourth generation (1986) ==
Fourth generation
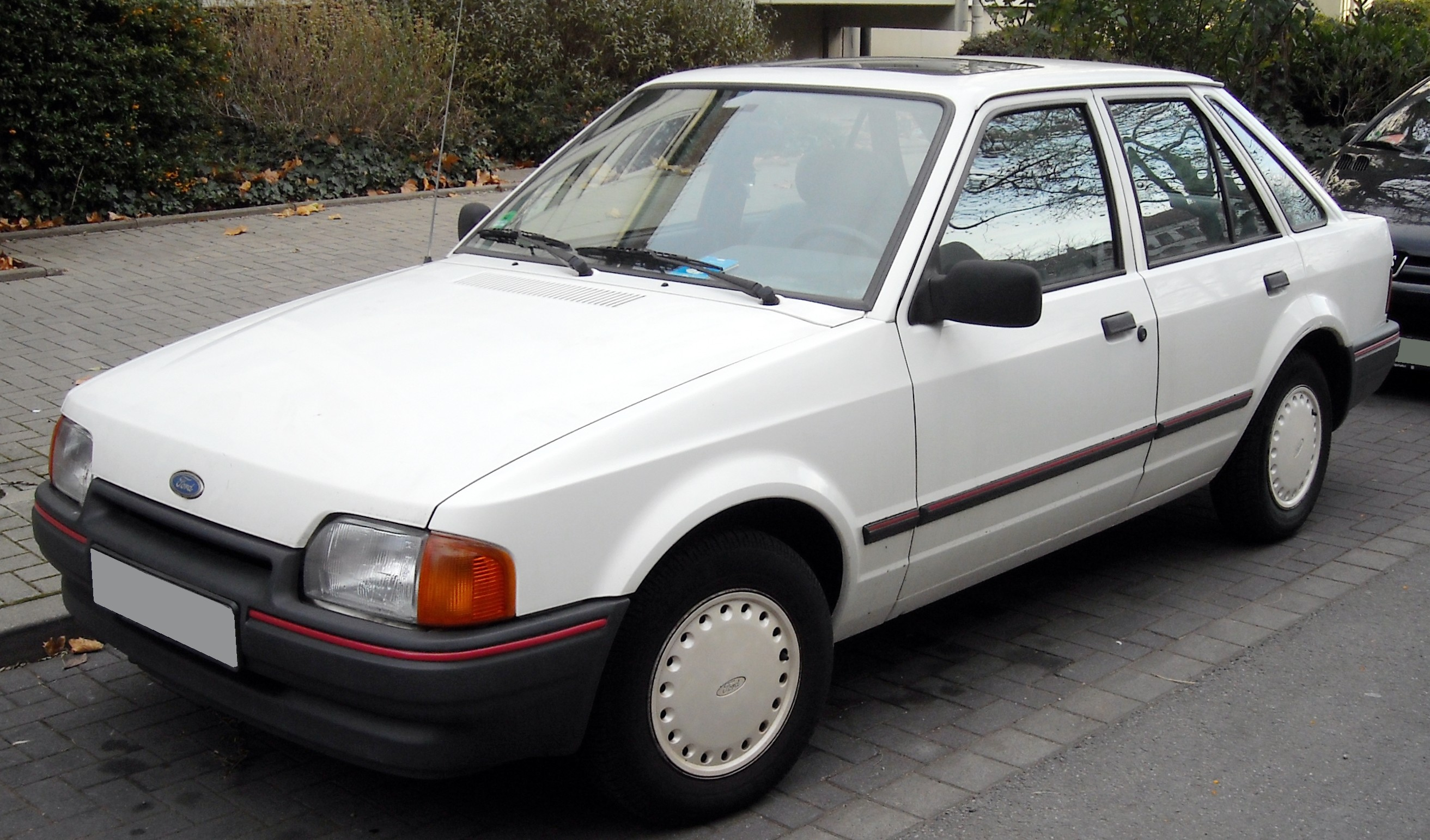

Overview
- Production: March 1986 – March 1992; August 1987 – January 1996 (Brazil)
- Assembly: United Kingdom: Halewood (Halewood Body & Assembly); Spain: Almussafes; Germany: Saarlouis (Ford Germany); Argentina: General Pacheco (Ford Argentina); Brazil: São Bernardo do Campo (Ford Brazil); Venezuela: Valencia, Carabobo

Body and chassis
- Body style: 3/5-door liftback; 3/5-door estate; 2-door cabriolet; 3-door van
- Layout: Front-engine, front-wheel-drive
- Platform: Ford CE14 platform
- Related: Ford Orion Mark II (1986–1990)

Powertrain
- Engine: petrol: 1117 cc Valencia I4 (1986–1989); 1118 cc HCS I4 (1989–1992); 1296 cc Valencia I4 (1986–1989); 1297 cc HCS I4 (1989–1992); 1392 cc CVH I4; 1596 cc CVH I4; 1596 cc CVH turbo I4; diesel: 1608 cc LT I4 (1986–1988); 1753 cc Lynx I4 (1988–1992); Latin America (petrol): 997 cc CHT I4; 1555 cc CHT I4; 1595 cc VW AP1600 I4; 1781 cc VW AP1800 I4
- Transmission: 4-speed BC4 manual 5-speed BC5 manual 3-speed ATX automatic CVT CTX automatic

Dimensions
- Wheelbase: 2,400 mm (94.5 in)
- Length: Hatchback: 4,022 mm (158.3 in); Estate: 4,080 mm (160.6 in)
- Width: 1,640 mm (64.6 in)
- Height: 1,385 mm (54.5 in)

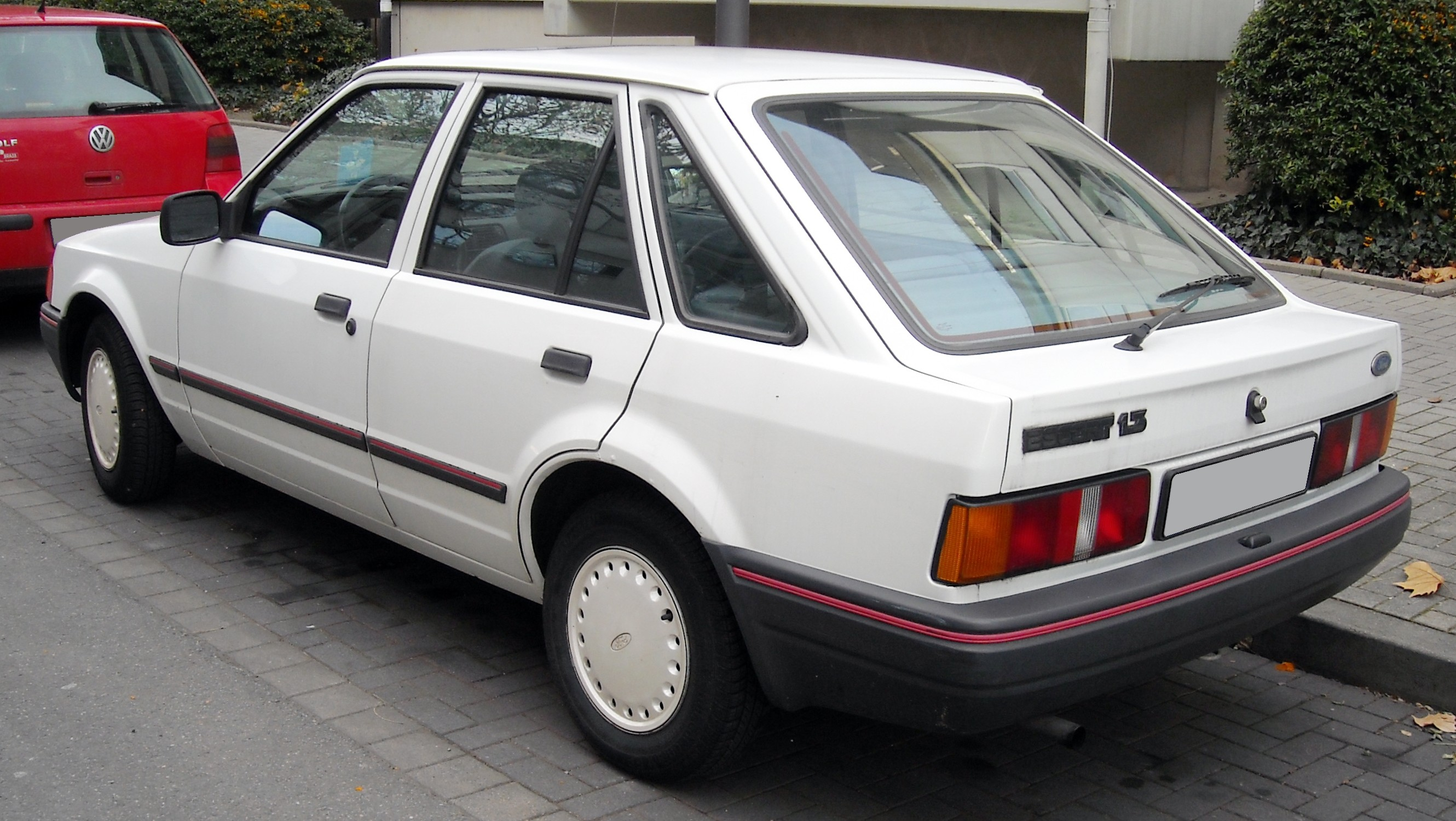
5-door hatchback

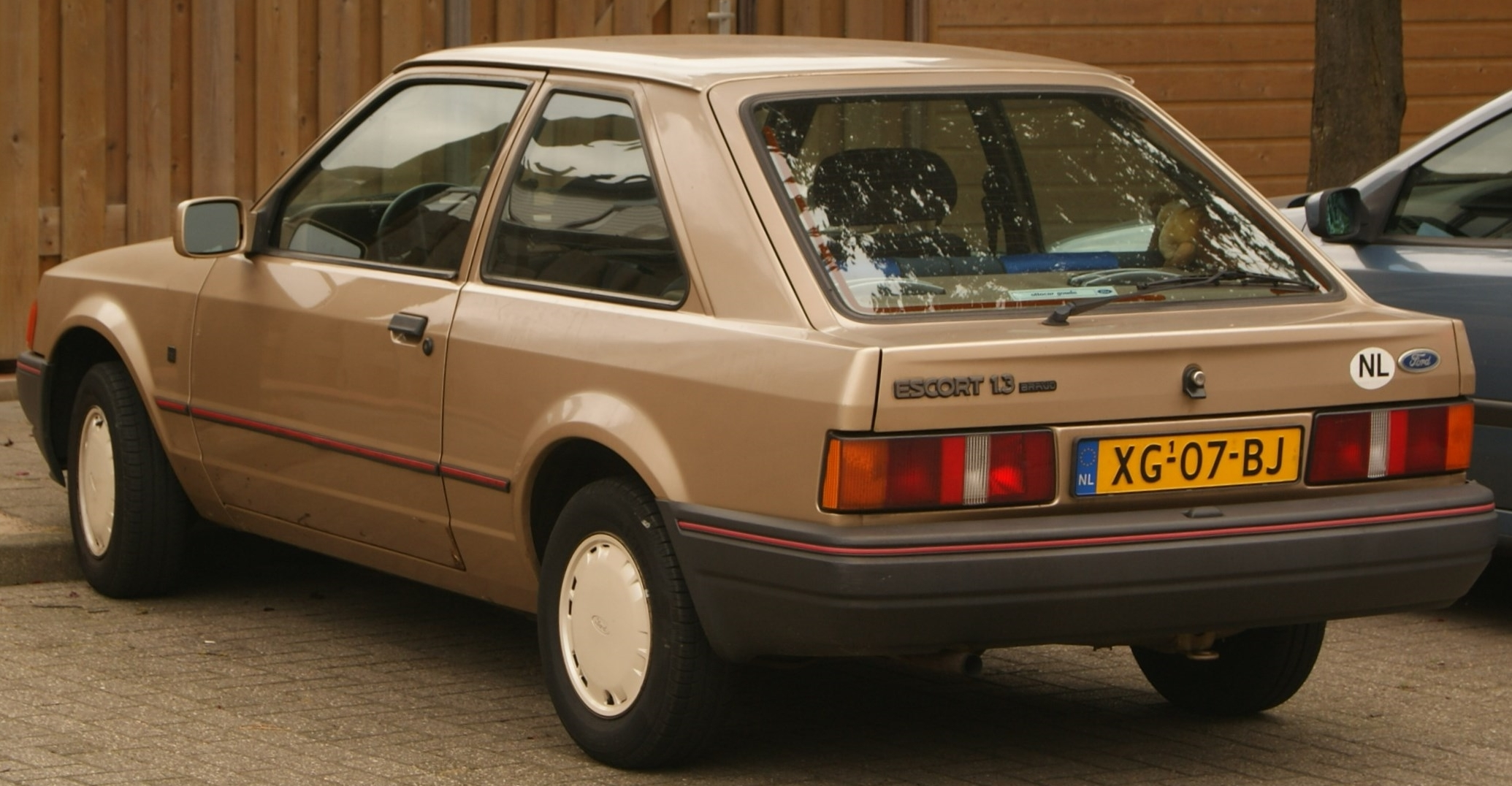
3-door hatchback

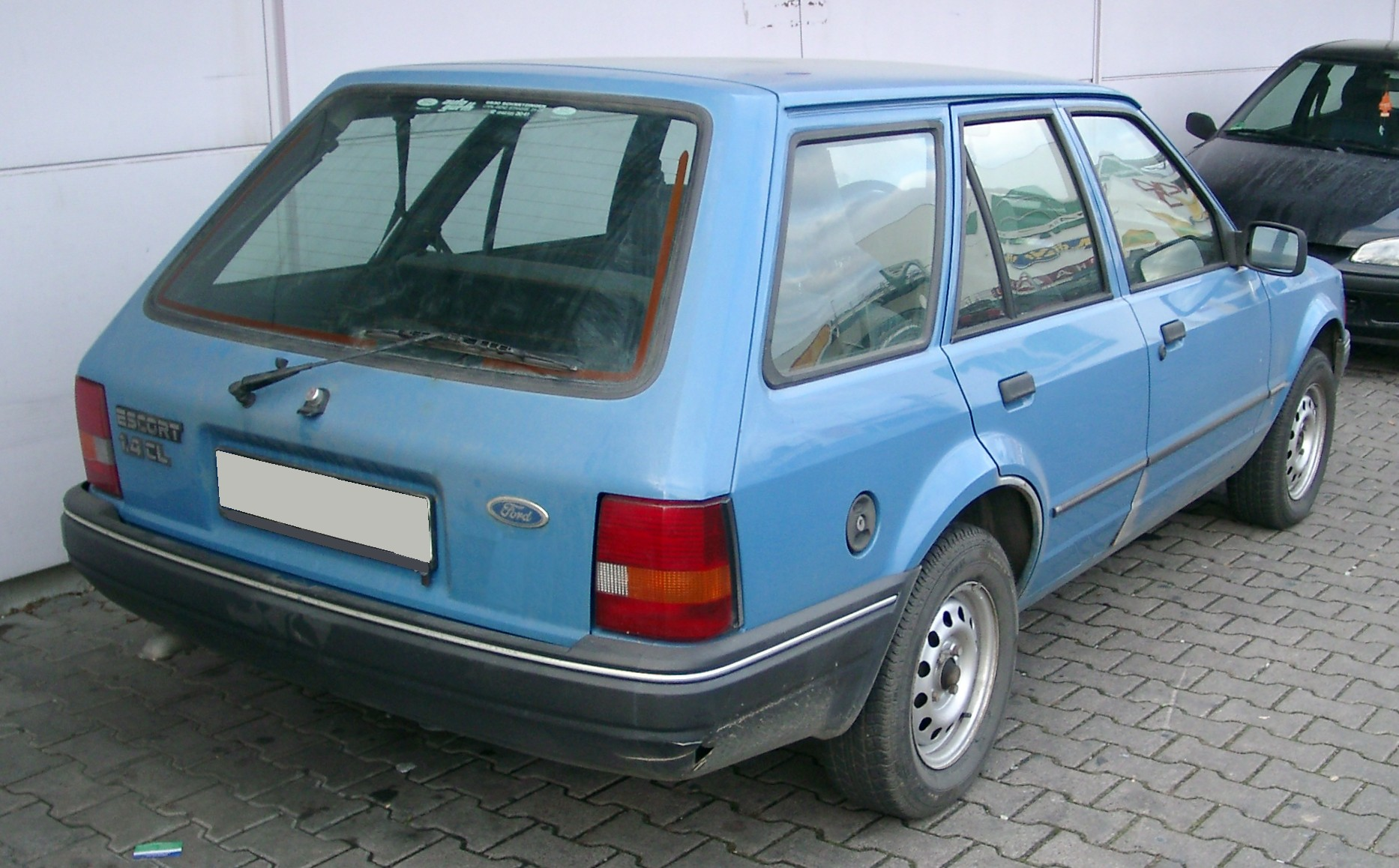
5-door estate

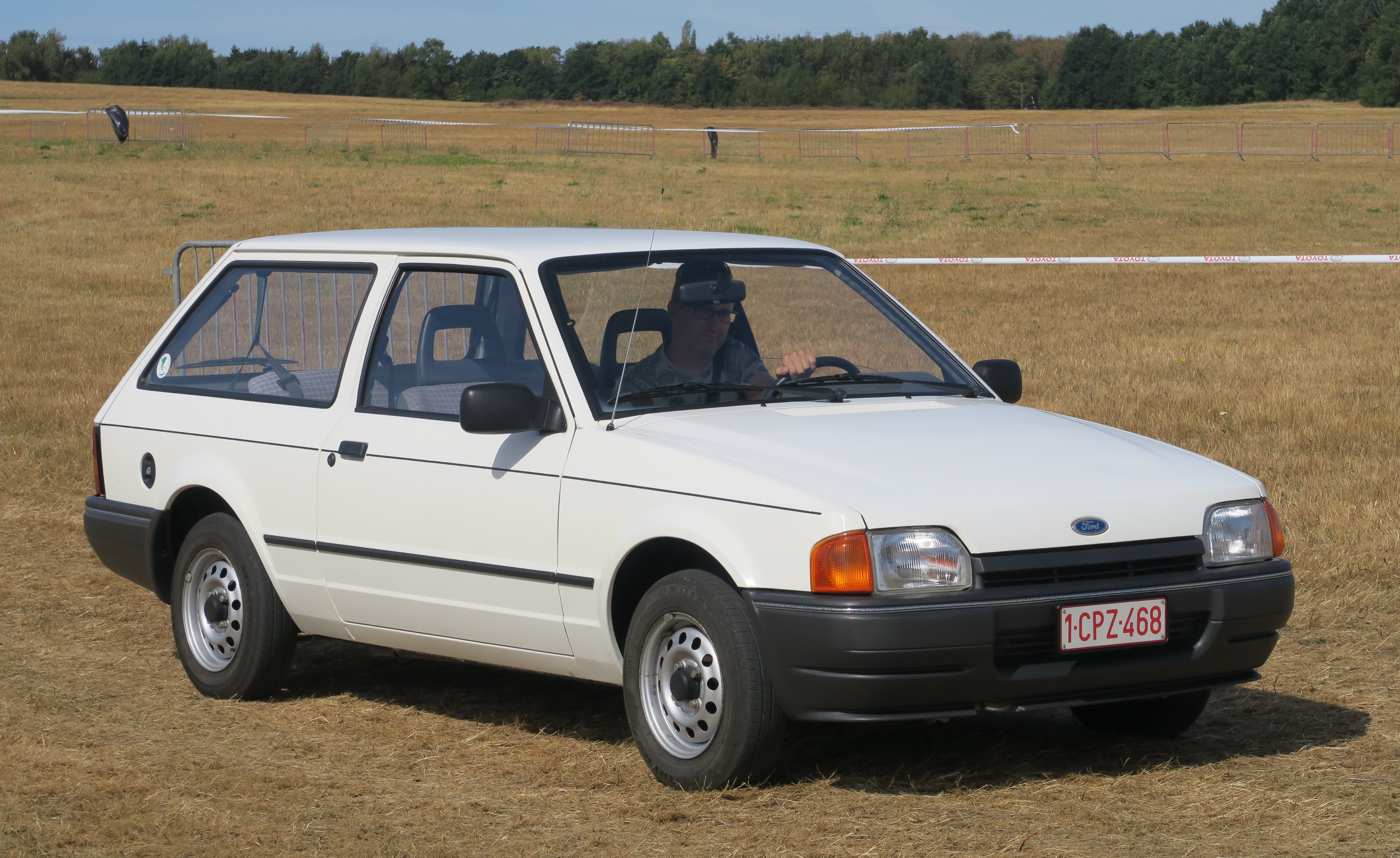
3-door estate

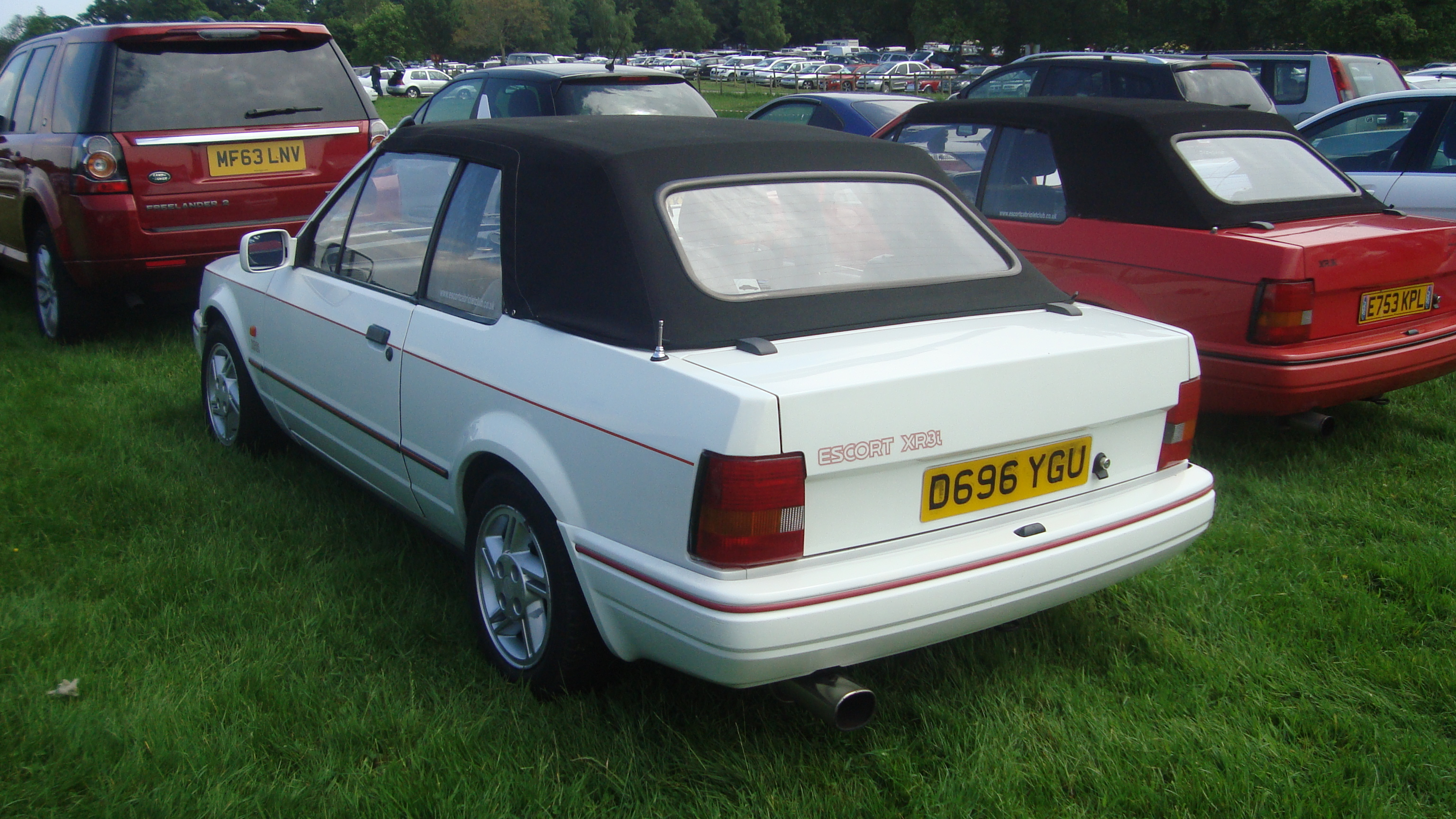
Cabriolet (XR3i)

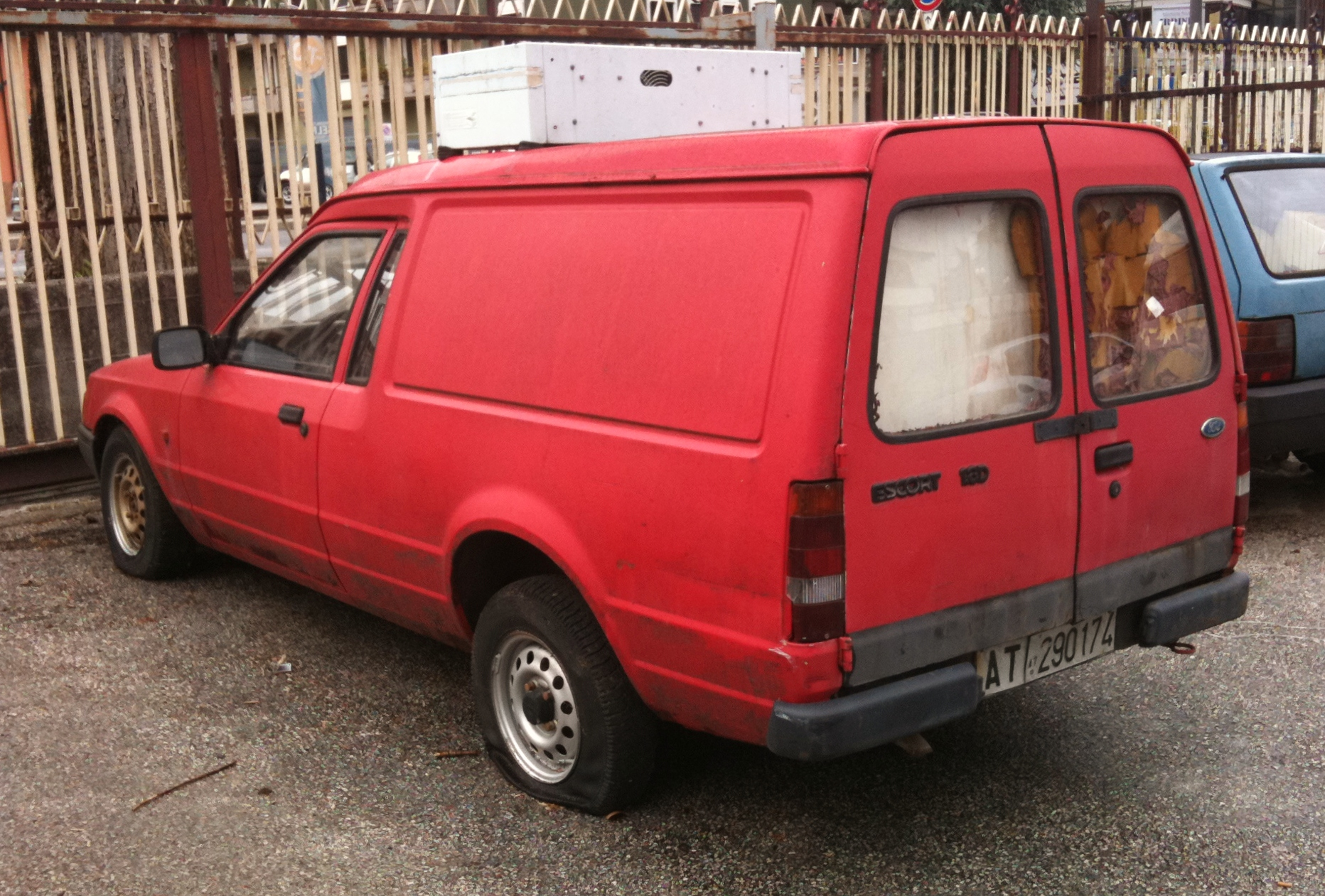
Van

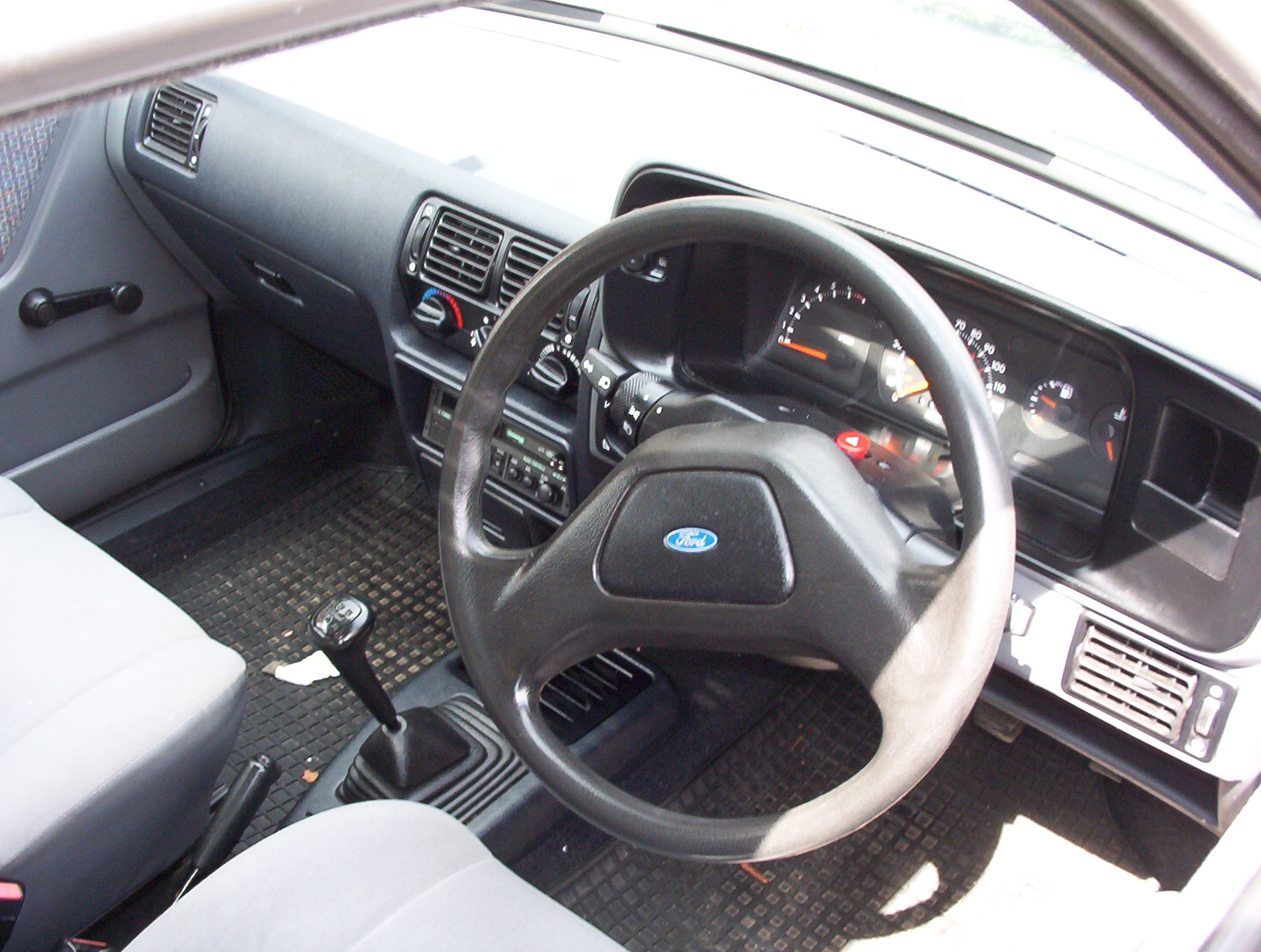
Dashboard of a Mk4 Escort

The fourth version of the Ford Escort was launched in March 1986, with only a small number of changes. Although popularly regarded as a fourth-generation model / known as the 'Mark IV', internally within Ford it was regarded as a Mark III facelift, and consequently carried the codename 'Erika-86'.

It was instantly recognisable as an updated version of the previous model, taking styling cues from the recently introduced Scorpio/Granada III – with a smooth-style nose and the "straked" rear lamp clusters smoothed over. Internally the car had a revised interior, with new door cards, a completely new dashboard, switchgear and instrumentation, although in the UK market the check-light system for low fuel, low oil, low coolant, low screenwash, and worn out brake pads was dropped (it was still available in other markets). Optional new features included a mechanical anti‐lock braking system (standard on RS Turbo models), a fuel computer on fuel-injected models, and a heated windscreen. The main mechanical changes were the introduction of a 'lean-burn' 1.4 L CVH engine (replacing the previous 1.3 CVH) . A 1.3 L version of the Valencia overhead valve engine was introduced for the Popular and L specification models, in addition to the existing 1.1L version. A new subframe for mounting the powertrain was introduced to combat earlier criticisms of drivetrain refinement of the original car, as well as more tweaking to the suspension settings to address the long standing issues with the Escort's damping and handling characteristics. Initially Chubb AVA lock barrels were fitted to the facelifted 1986 models but these were soon changed over to the Tibbe type as with the Ford Orion.

These changes were welcome at a time when the Escort was faced with a host of new competitors; General Motors had brought out a new version of the Opel Kadett/Vauxhall Astra in October 1984, shortly after Volkswagen had introduced the Mk II Golf and British Leyland had launched the Austin Maestro a year earlier, while the British-built Peugeot 309 had gone on sale just weeks before the updated Escort. All-new competitors from Fiat and Renault were just two years away.

In 1987, an LX trim designation was introduced, situated between the L and GL models. That same year, the commercial line-up was expanded with a sedan delivery version of the 3-door estate bodyshell (with filled in rear windows and no back seats) known as the "Combi", which sat below the existing van versions.

The 1989 model year cars saw major changes to the engine line up, with the diesel engine being enlarged to 1.8 L. The entry level 1.1 L and 1.3 L models were updated with the redesigned HCS version of the Valencia engine developed for the Mk III Fiesta. On the 1.6 L CVH injection engines, a Ford developed electronic fuel injection system replaced the Bosch K-Jetronic fuel injection system in the XR3i and Orion Ghia injection. Other changes for the '89 were the slightly altered front grille aperture (which was now common to both the Escort and Orion) whilst the Escort badge at the rear changed to look more modern as well as some minor trim revisions and equipment upgrades on all models – "L" models now had tinted glass and a sunroof as standard.

Ford gave the Escort‐based Orion saloon a similar makeover. Carried over from the previous range was the 3-speed automatic which was ultimately replaced late in the production run with a variant of the CTX stepless gearbox as first used in the Fiesta a couple of years earlier.

The 1990 model year saw equipment levels across the range improved substantially, with all but the base Popular models being fitted with a sunroof as standard, and the GL gaining electric windows and mirrors. Spring 1990 saw the final revisions – the Popular now gained a radio cassette and a 5-speed gearbox, whilst catalytic converters and central point fuel injection were now available on the 1.4 and 1.6 CVH engines.

=== Special Editions ===
As part of the run-out year of the Erika-platform Escort and Orion after a decade of production, several notable special edition models were created – a luxurious Orion 1600E with leather seats, fuel injection, alloy wheels and most optional extras as standard was produced during 1989 and 1990. A total of 1,600 were made. The "Bonus" was essentially a 3-door 1.3 Popular, but with metallic paint and tailgate wash/wipe as standard. The Escort Eclipse (based on the 1.3 LX) fitted with electric windows, alloy wheels, boot spoiler and only available in two colours – Amalfi Blue or Flambeau Red (shades that were previously reserved for the XR3i) – was sold up until the model's discontinuation in September 1990.

Despite the appearance of the new generation Escort, dealer stocks of the Mk4 remained available well into the following year – in the United Kingdom a small number were registered with "J" prefix licence plates indicating a post-August 1991 registration date – one year after the end of production, possibly due to overstock or the negative reception of its successor.

=== Manufacturing locations ===
Escorts for European markets continued to be assembled at Halewood, near Liverpool, and at the West German factory of Saarlouis. Sales were strong through the decade, and during the later 1980s Escort production also commenced at the Ford plant originally established for Fiesta production in Valencia. European production finished in 1990, although stocks of the model, especially the XR3i and RS Turbo variants continued well into 1991 and eventually finished in 1992.

At this time, the Escort was dropped in South Africa and replaced by the Mazda-derived Laser and Meteor. However, the Escort‐based Bantam pick-up remained in production, facelifted, and was also sold as a Mazda Rustler.

=== Latin America ===
Brazilian Escorts were introduced only shortly after the European originals, in August 1987. At first, only the CHT 1.6-liter engine was available, running on alcohol or petrol and in a more powerful XR3 version only running on alcohol. Power was up marginally over the previous generation. As of May 1989, the 1.8 L and 1.6 L AP engine made by Volkswagen became available. This was part of the AutoLatina agreement, where Ford CHT engines were used in Volkswagen cars and vice versa. The 1.0 L and 1.6 L were all Ford CHT motors. All Escorts made after 1993 were fuel-injected, excepting the Hobby models. Additionally, the Mark IV model was made until 1992 on all versions, except the Hobby which was made until 1996.

This generation was only built with three doors in Brazil, while Argentinian production included the five-door model. The advent of Mercosur opened the door for trade with Brazil's neighbours. In late 1991, for the 1992 model year, the Argentinian-made five-door became available in Brazil under the name "Escort Guarujá" (named after a town in the state of São Paulo). This model was only available with a catalyzed version of the 1.8-liter "AP" engine and a high standard of equipment, including the Ghia's body-coloured rear spoiler and distinct, eight-hole alloy wheels. The Guarujá was the first catalyzed car to be built in Argentina, although it was not available in its home market. It sold well initially, leading all other imports in January 1992. However, Argentinian products had a low reputation in Brazil at the time and the Guarujá only remained on the market for about a year. The more powerful Volkswagen engine finally allowed the XR3, now with 99 CV (73 kW), to live up to the promises made by its appearance. In 1990, the XR3 gained body-colored skirts and wings.

Argentinian production had begun in 1988 with many parts imported from Brazil, although the five-door model was available there from the beginning and the engine options differed. The original versions were the GL and Ghia, both fitted with the 1.6-liter CHT; these were then replaced by the Volkswagen-made AP 1.6 (not used in Brazilian Escorts) in the Escort 1.6 LX and Ghia SX after a little over a year. There was also the 1.8-liter Ghia S – close in spec to the Guarujá export version, and with available air conditioning – and the sporty XR3. The convertible was available, shipped in fully built from Brazil. The fourth generation Escort remained in production in Argentina until 1994.

In 1993, the Escort Hobby trim was introduced in Brazil, using a 1.0 L 50 hp (37 kW) engine. This was a small-bore version derived from the CHT 1.3 L used in the Brazilian Mk III. This engine was unique to Brazil, whereas the 1.1 L engine was smallest available in most markets. The 1.0 was less powerful, but fuel efficient. Brazil has a special tax break for cars with engines of less than one litre, making this a closely contested segment. The Hobby did not receive Escort badging.

There were no trims with a high-power engine in Brazil. The most powerful Escort was the 1991 Escort XR3 Formula which had 105 PS (77 kW). The on-board computer was not available in Brazil.

== Fifth generation (1990) ==
Fifth generation
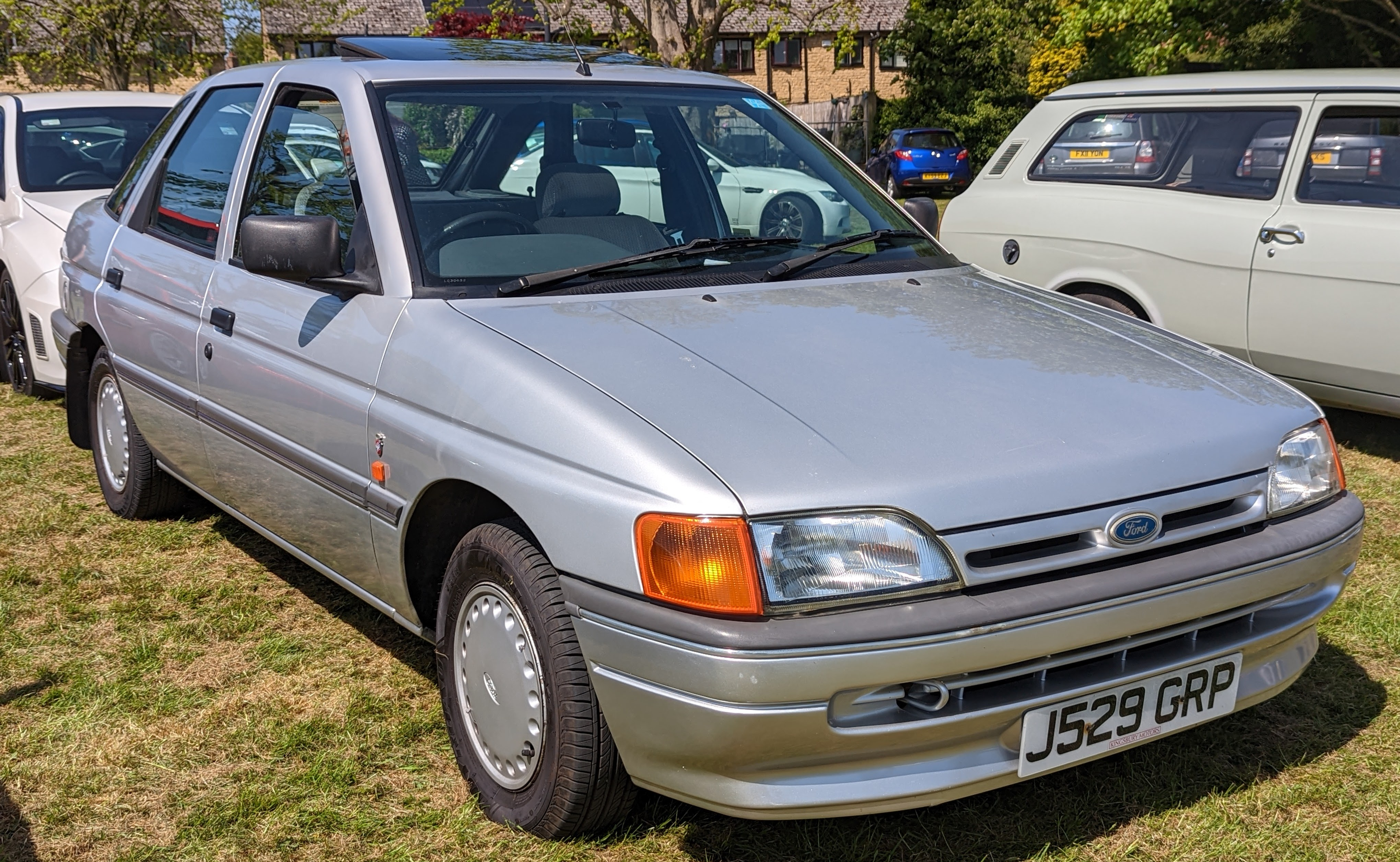

Overview
- Also called: Ford Orion Mark III (1990–1993)
- Production: September 1990 – March 1997
- Assembly: United Kingdom: Halewood (Halewood Body & Assembly); Spain: Almussafes; Germany: Saarlouis (Ford Germany); Argentina: General Pacheco (Ford Argentina); Brazil: São Bernardo do Campo (Ford Brazil); Turkey: Istanbul (Ford Otosan)
- Designer: Andrew Jacobsen (design director); Helmuth Schrader (Head of Design)

Body and chassis
- Body style: 3/5-door liftback; 4-door saloon; 5-door estate; 2-door cabriolet; 3-door van
- Layout: Front-engine, front-wheel-drive/four-wheel-drive
- Platform: Ford CE14 platform
- Related: Volkswagen Pointer (hatchback, South America); Volkswagen Logus (saloon, South America)

Powertrain
- Engine: 1297 cc HCS I4; 1392 cc CVH I4; 1555 cc CHT I4 (Latin America); 1597 cc CVH I4; 1598 cc Zetec I4; 1781 cc VW AP I4 (Latin America); 1796 cc Zetec I4; 1984 cc VW AP I4 (Latin America); 1998 cc N7A DOHC I4; 1993 cc Cosworth YBT turbo I4; 1753 cc Endura-D diesel I4; 1753 cc Endura-D turbodiesel I4
- Transmission: 4-speed BC4 manual; 5-speed BC5 manual; 5-speed MTX-75 manual; 3-speed ATX automatic; CVT CTX automatic

Dimensions
- Wheelbase: 2,525 mm (99.4 in)
- Length: Hatchback: 4,036 mm (158.9 in); Saloon: 4,268 mm (168.0 in); Estate: 4,268 mm (168.0 in)
- Width: 1,692 mm (66.6 in)
- Height: 1,395 mm (54.9 in)
- Curb weight: 900–1,070 kg (1,984–2,359 lb)

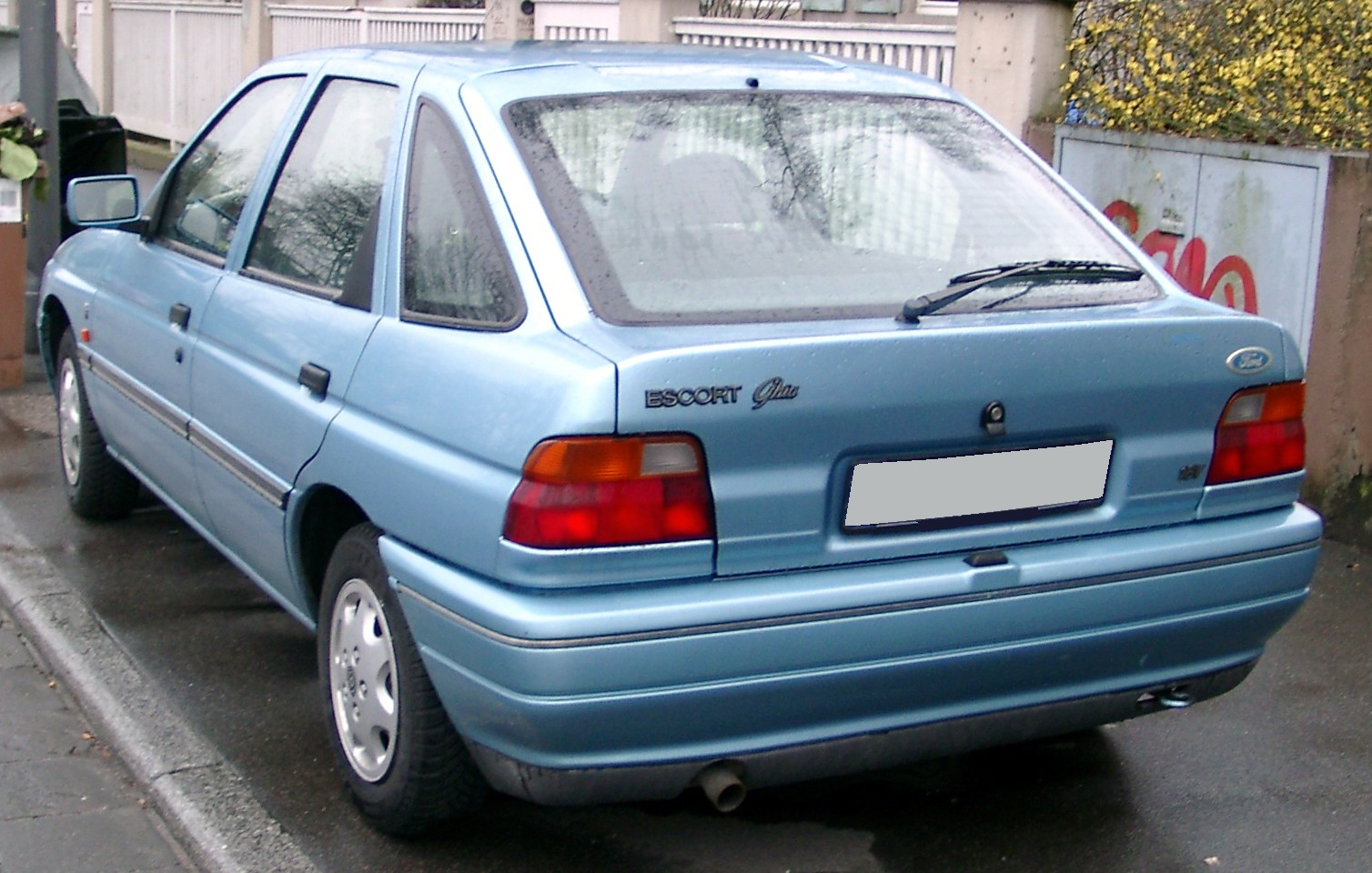
5-door hatchback (pre-facelift)

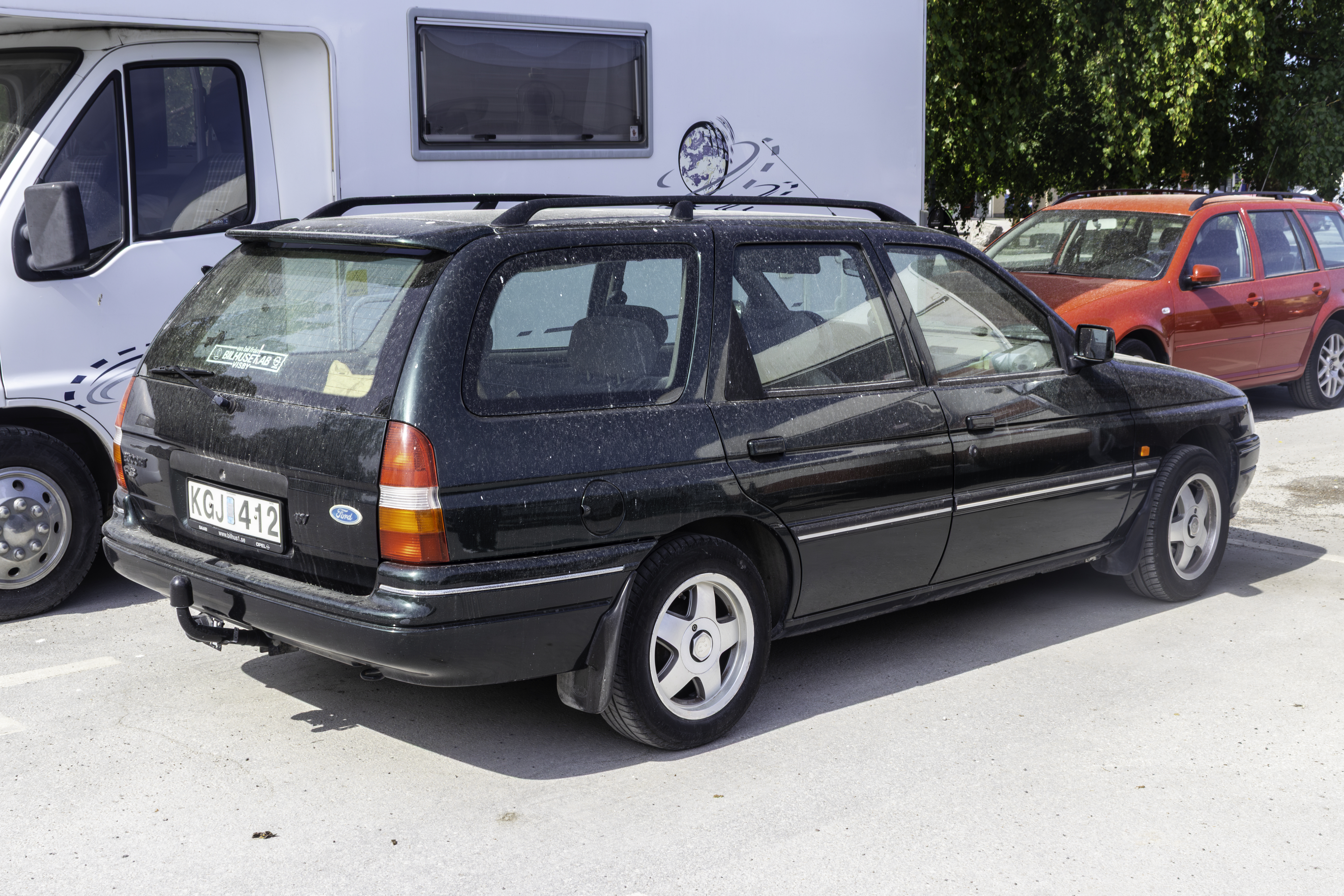
Estate

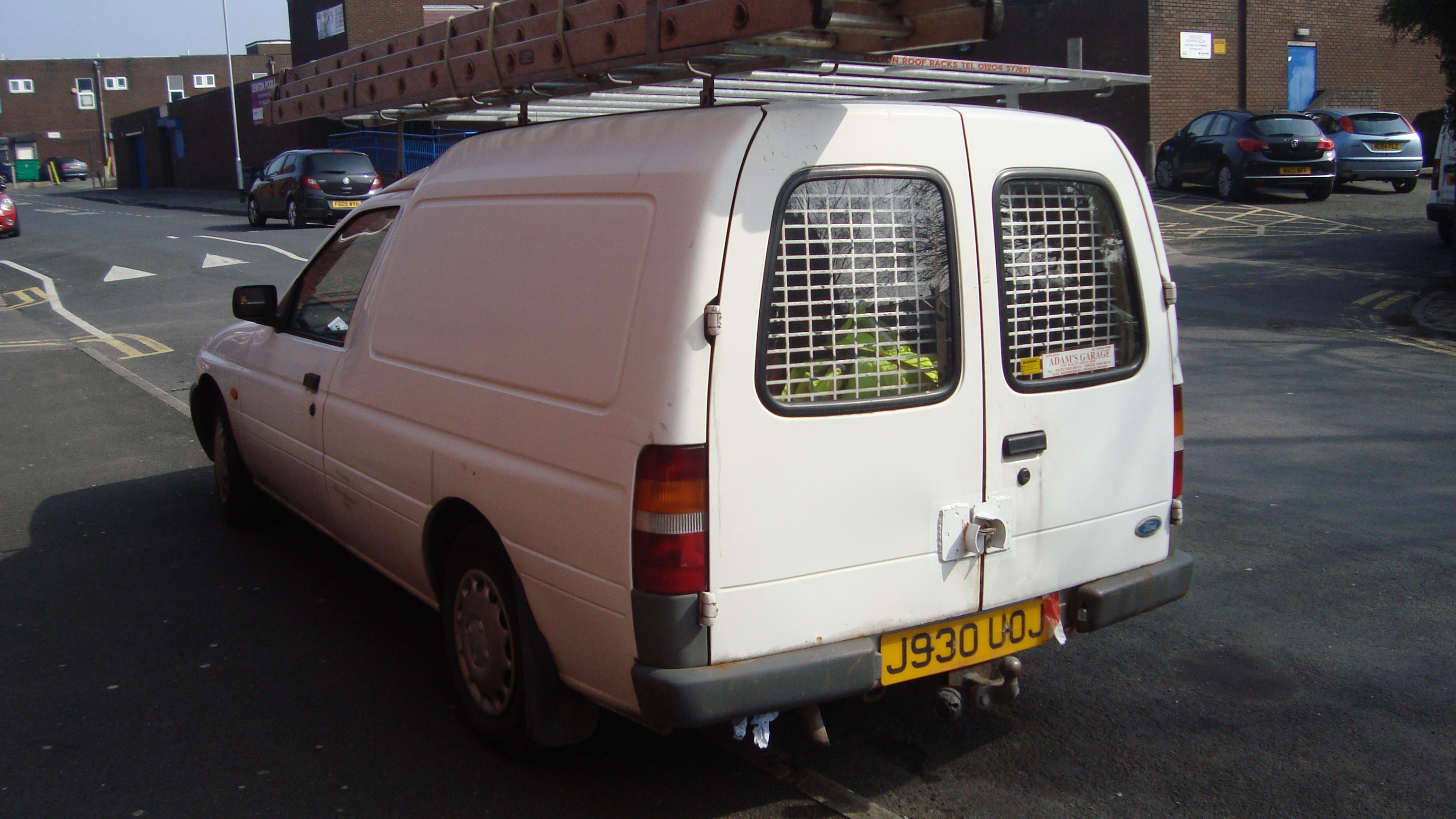
Van

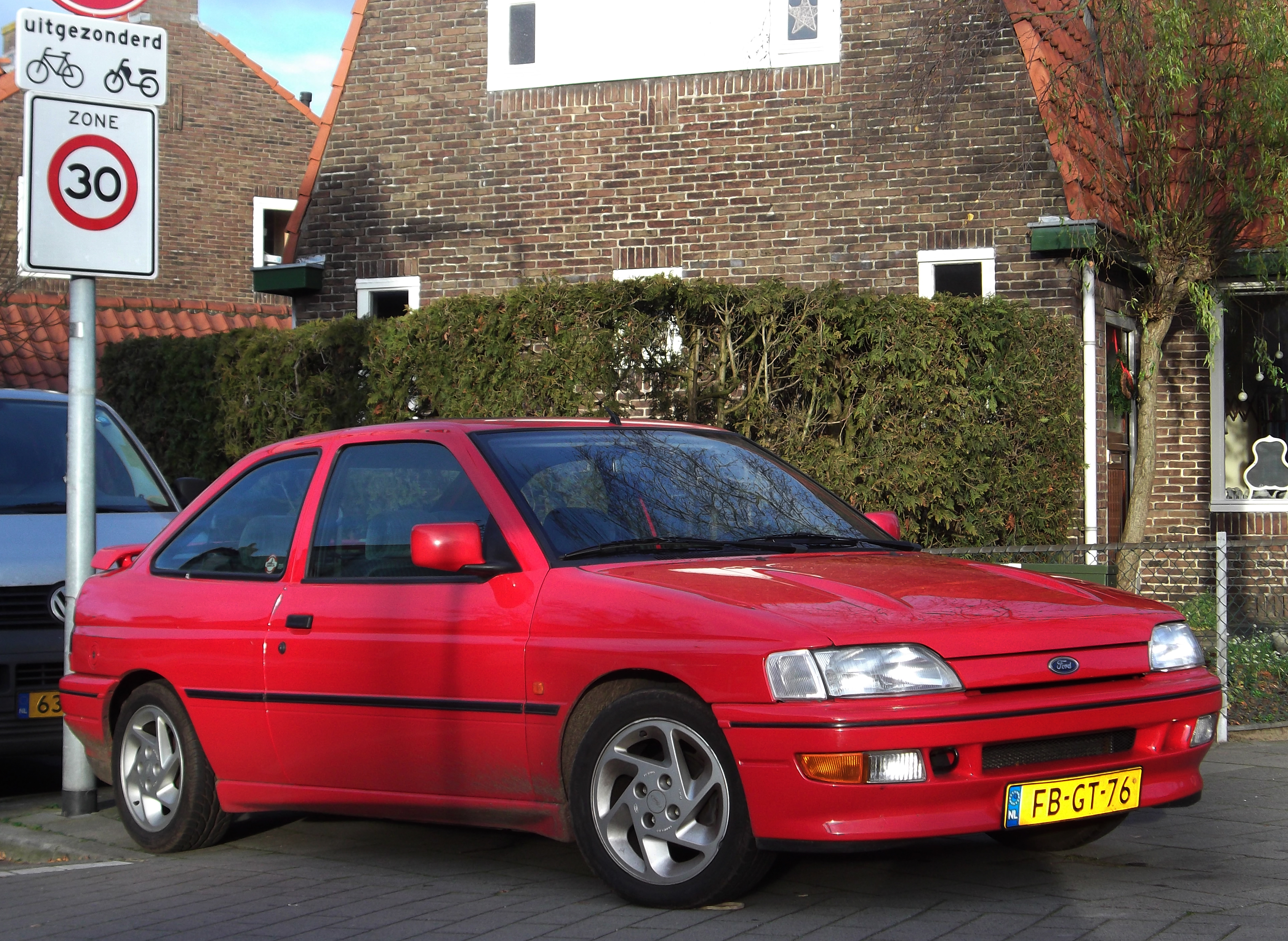
RS2000 hatchback (pre-facelift)

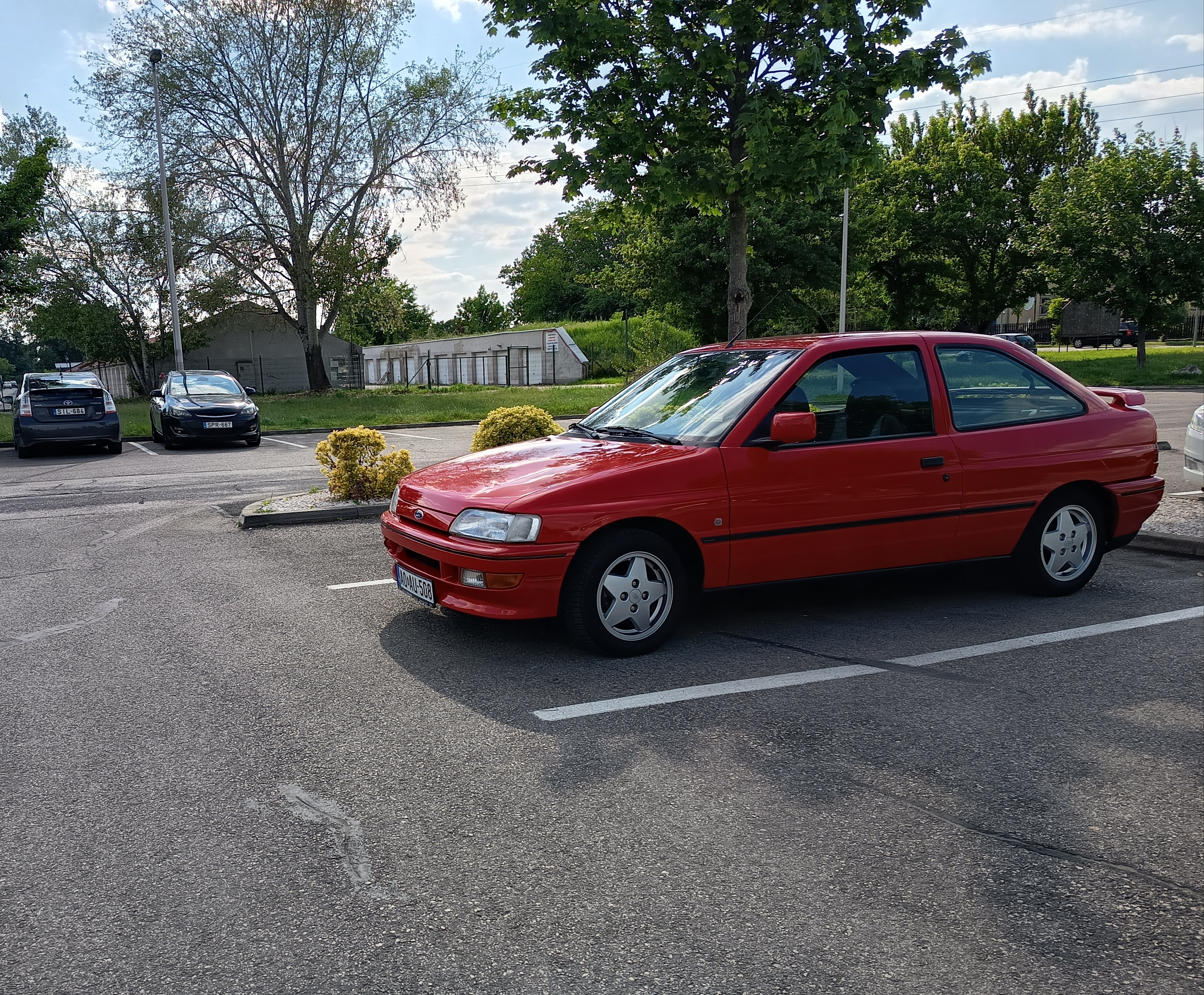
Ford Escort Mk5 XR3i 1.8 16v 105 HP

The Escort Mark V (and Mark III Orion saloon) arrived in September 1990 with an all-new bodyshell and a simplified torsion beam rear suspension (instead of the Mark III's fully independent layout). Initially the 1.3 L HCS, 1.4 L and 1.6 L CVH petrol and 1.8 L diesel units were carried over from the old model. This model received considerable improvement in aerodynamics obtaining drag coefficient of CX: 0.35 in the common versions, 0.34 in the XR3i and RS2000 versions and 0.32 in the Orion saloon variant (considerable improvement over the previous coefficient of cx 0.39 in MK4).The fifth-generation Ford Escort also saw an increase in trunk size (385 liters compared to 305 liters for the Escort MK4) and greater internal space with 2525mm wheelbase. The Escort MK5 was internally called the CE14 (European C-Segment, 14th Project) and was designed in Merkenich, Cologne, Germany, where Andrew Jacobsen was design director and Helmuth Schrader the model's head of design.

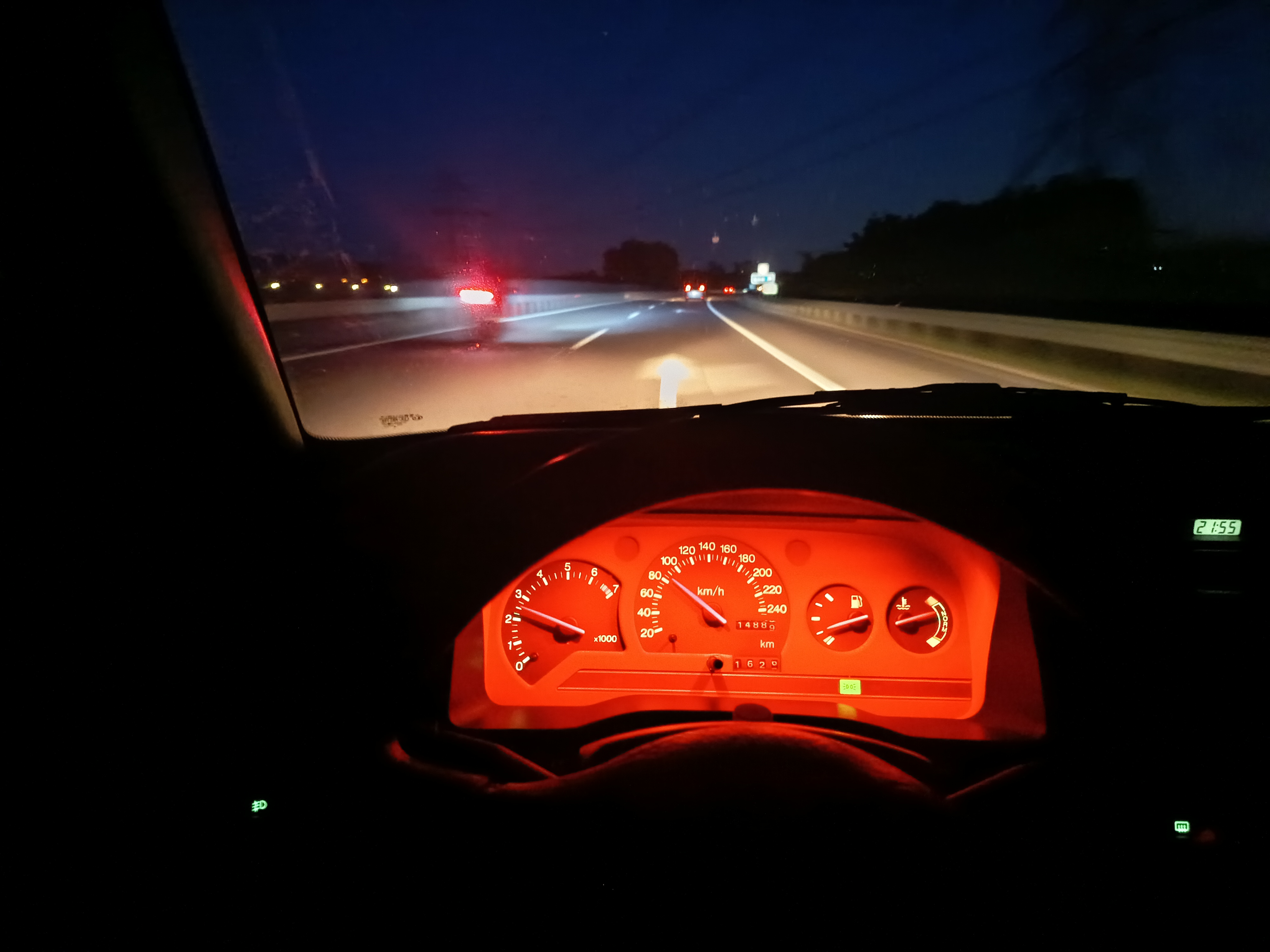
Ford Escort Mk5 XR3i 1.8 16v 105 HP Dashboard

In early 1992, an all new Zetec 16-valve engine was launched bringing improved driveability, while also marking the return of the XR3i which was available with two versions of the 1.8 L Zetec engine. The 150 PS (110 kW) RS2000 also appeared in the autumn of 1991 with a 16v version of the Sierra's I4 2.0 L engine and also improved ride and handling meaning that this version of the Escort finally delivered on the road. Specifications, however, were also higher than before. The Escort was now available with items such as power steering, electric windows, central locking, electronic antilock brakes, and air conditioning. Some of these options were even available on some of the entry-level models.

=== South America ===
The fifth generation Escort was launched in South America in December 1992, being manufactured in Brazil and Argentina by AutoLatina, a joint-venture between Volkswagen and Ford. A result of this collaboration was that these Escorts were equipped with a VW AP engine in the top 1.8 and 2.0 L versions, now fitted with catalytic converters. The top of the line was the Escort XR3i, equipped with a multipoint fuel injected version of the VW AP 2.0 L engine generating 115 PS (85 kW). The entry-level Escorts received the old Renault-derived 1.6-liter CHT engine with 73 PS (54 kW), while the earlier Mark IV continued to be available as the Escort Hobby, with a 1.0 or 1.6-liter engine.

Three- and five-door hatchbacks were available, as was a two-door convertible. In October 1993 the Verona appeared as the 4-door saloon and was also available in Argentina. This generation also spawned two VW-branded cars with the same mechanics (but different body styles and interiors) called Volkswagen Pointer (five-door hatchback) and Logus (a two-door saloon).

For 1996, South America received the front end of the European facelift ("sixth generation"), but the rear end maintained the original scheme which makes this vehicle unique to those markets. The XR3 nameplate was dropped, becoming the Escort Racer. Just before being redesigned to match the European Mark VI, Brazilian production came to a halt and Argentina became the sole Escort manufacturer in South America. The cars were exported to Brazil and elsewhere.

=== Escort RS Cosworth ===
Early 1992 saw the launch of the Escort RS Cosworth. Intended to replace the Sierra Sapphire RS Cosworth (which finished production shortly afterwards) as Ford's stalwart rally challenger as well as a competitor to supercars with private buyers, it used the turbocharged 2.0 L Cosworth 16-valve engine, generated some 225 PS (167 kW) and was capable of 150 mph. As well as having four-wheel drive, its most memorable feature was its extremely large "whale-tail" tailgate spoiler.

The 2,500 road-going examples sold (required for homologation purposes) were made, but demand for the car was so high that Ford kept producing them. Later models (June 1994 onwards) have a smaller turbo than the homologation versions and came with the whale-tail spoiler as an option. The Escort Cosworth ceased production in 1996, but it has already achieved classic status and has a huge following. However, the car wasn't mechanically an Escort, being based on the four-wheel drive Sierra floorpan and mechanicals, including its longitudinally mounted engine, and was merely clothed in body panels to resemble a Mark V.

=== Engines ===
- 1.3 L (1297 cc) HCS 60 PS (44 kW; 59 bhp)
- 1.4 L CFi (1392 cc) CVH 71 PS (52 kW; 70 bhp)
- 1.4 L EFi (1392 cc) CVH 75 PS (55 kW; 74 bhp)
- 1.6 L G/H (1597 cc) CVH 90 PS (66 kW; 89 bhp)
- 1.6 L EFi (1597 cc) CVH 105 PS (77 kW; 104 bhp)
- 1.6 L EFi (1598 cc) Zetec 90 PS (66 kW; 89 bhp)
- 1.8 L EFi (1796 cc) Zetec 105 PS (77 kW; 104 bhp)
- 1.8 L EFi (1796 cc) Zetec 115 PS (85 kW; 113 bhp)
- 1.8 L EFi (1796 cc) Zetec 130 PS (96 kW; 128 bhp)
- 1.8 L D (1753 cc) Endura D 60 PS (44 kW; 59 bhp)
- 1.8 L TD (1753 cc) Endura D 70 PS (51 kW; 69 bhp)
- 1.8 L TD (1753 cc) Endura D 75 PS (55 kW; 74 bhp)
- 1.8 L TD (1753 cc) Endura D 90 PS (66 kW; 89 bhp)
- 2.0 L EFi (1998 cc) I4 DOHC 150 PS (110 kW; 148 bhp)
- 2.0 L (1993 cc) Cosworth YBT 227 PS (167 kW; 224 bhp)
- 1.8 L (1781 cc) VW AP 96 PS (71 kW; 95 bhp)
- 2.0 L (1984 cc) VW AP 116 PS (85 kW; 114 bhp)

=== Facelift ===
Stung by the criticism of the original Mark V (which was still a decent seller despite motoring press criticism of its styling, ride and handling), Ford facelifted the Escort and Orion in September 1992, giving the revised cars a new grille, bonnet and, in the Escort convertible and hatchback's case, a new rear end. A new 1.6 L 16-valve 90 bhp (66 kW) Zetec engine was introduced, replacing the previous CVH. Fuel injection was now standard on all petrol models, and Ford introduced a four-wheel-drive variant of the RS2000, offering much improved handling over its front-wheel-drive cousins. A first for the Escort also saw the introduction of all disc brakes on all four wheels as standard on all RS2000 and XR3i models.

Also new for 1993 were 1.3 L and 1.4 L CFi petrol engines and 1.8 L diesel engines.

In September 1993, after a decade of use, the Orion name was retired and the saloon took on the Escort badge. The XR3i was discontinued a few months later, at the beginning of 1994.

The crash structure of the Escort and Orion was also improved for the 1993 model year as part of the facelift, featuring side impact bars, a reinforced safety cage, improved crumple zones and front seat-belt pretensioners and for the 1994 model year airbags were added to the Escort range when the Orion name was dropped. This Escort was the first European Ford after the Mondeo to feature an airbag; shortly afterwards a driver's airbag became standard across the whole Ford range, with many other models having a passenger airbag as at least optional equipment. Production ended in 1995, although stocks including the Escort, Escort L, Ghia and Si continued through 1996 and finished in 1997.

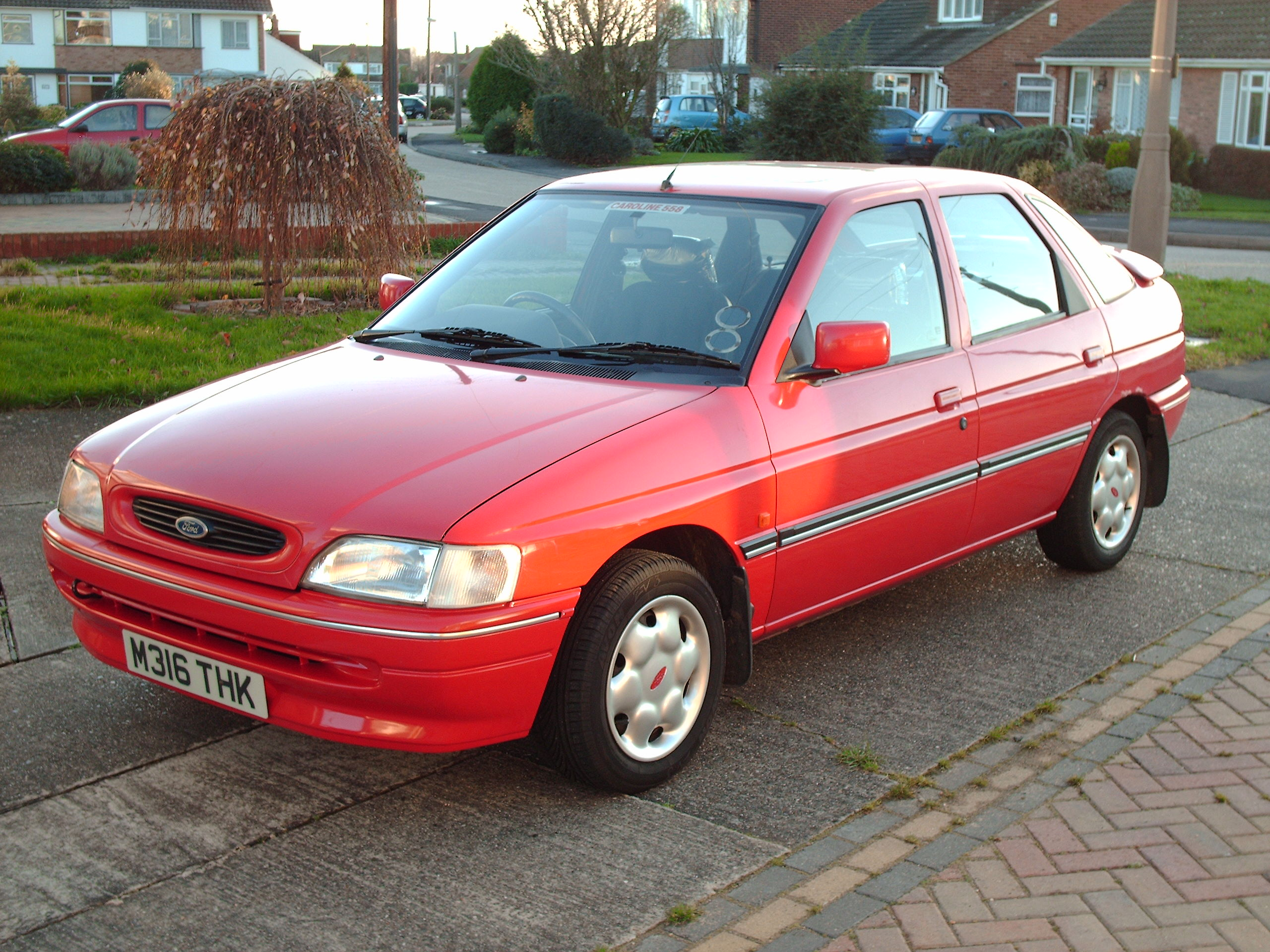
Front view of 5-door hatchback (post facelift)

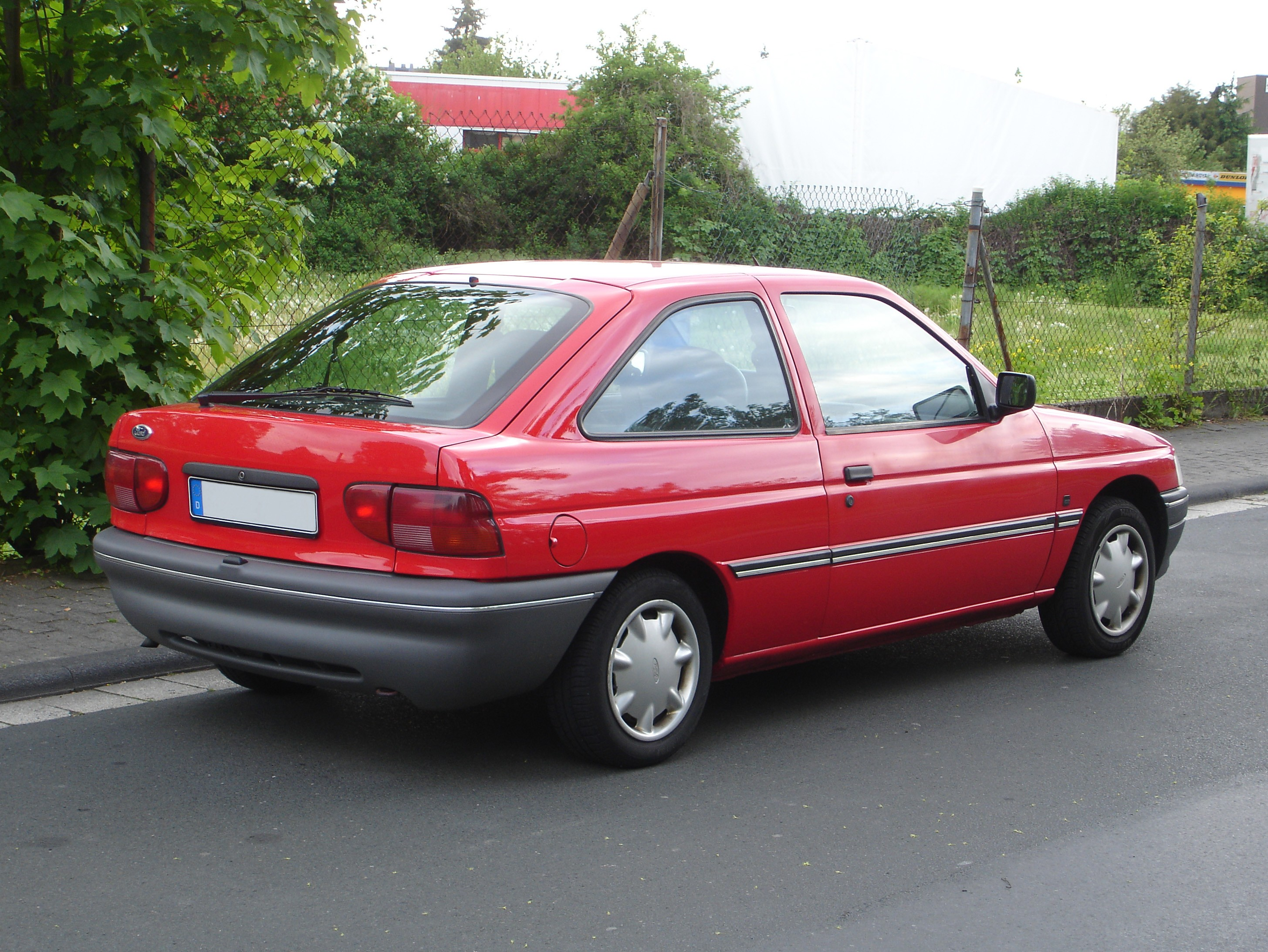
Rear view of 3-door hatchback (post facelift)

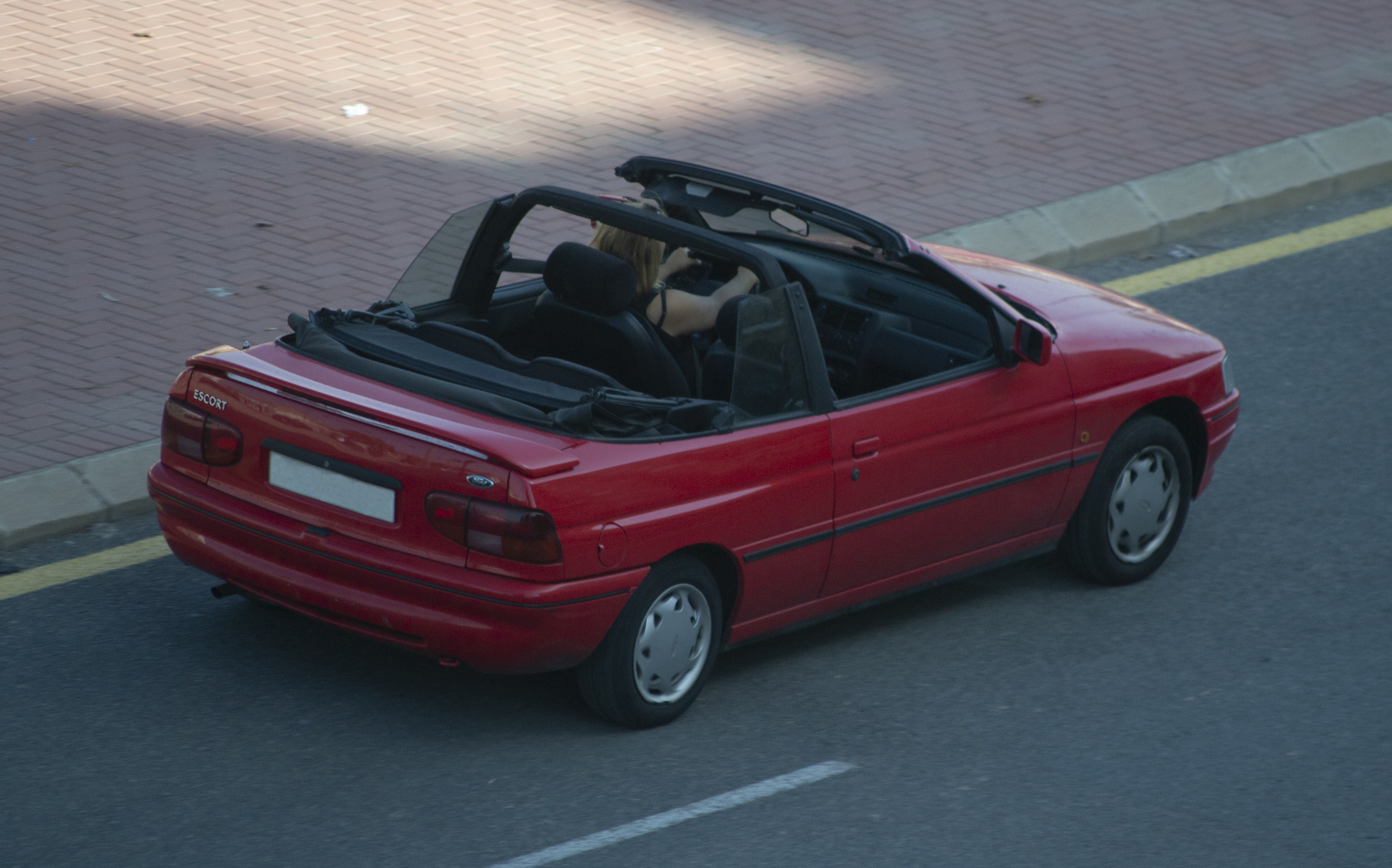
Facelifted convertible

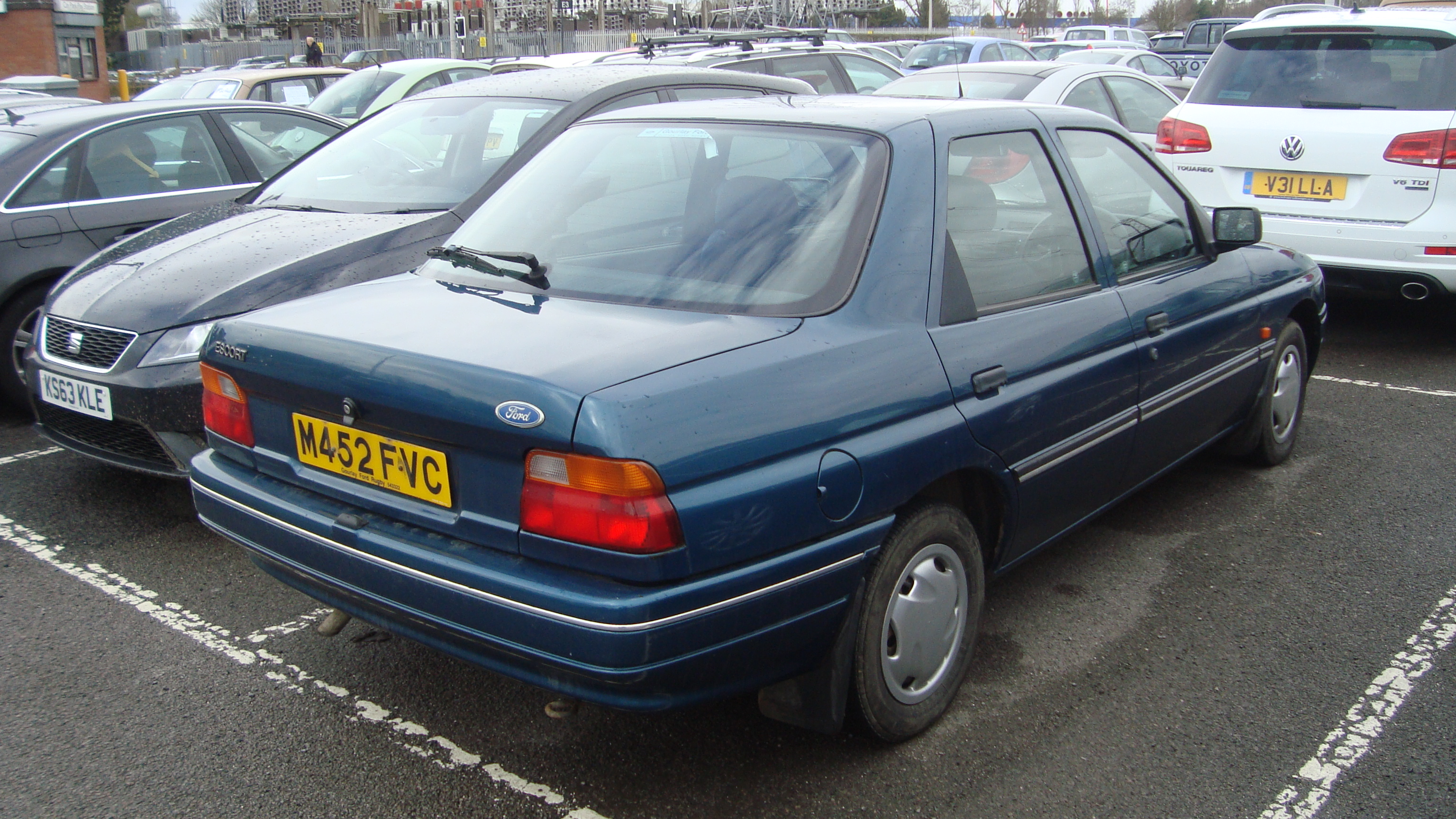
Post-facelift Escort Saloon (Equipe trim level) – after the Orion name was dropped

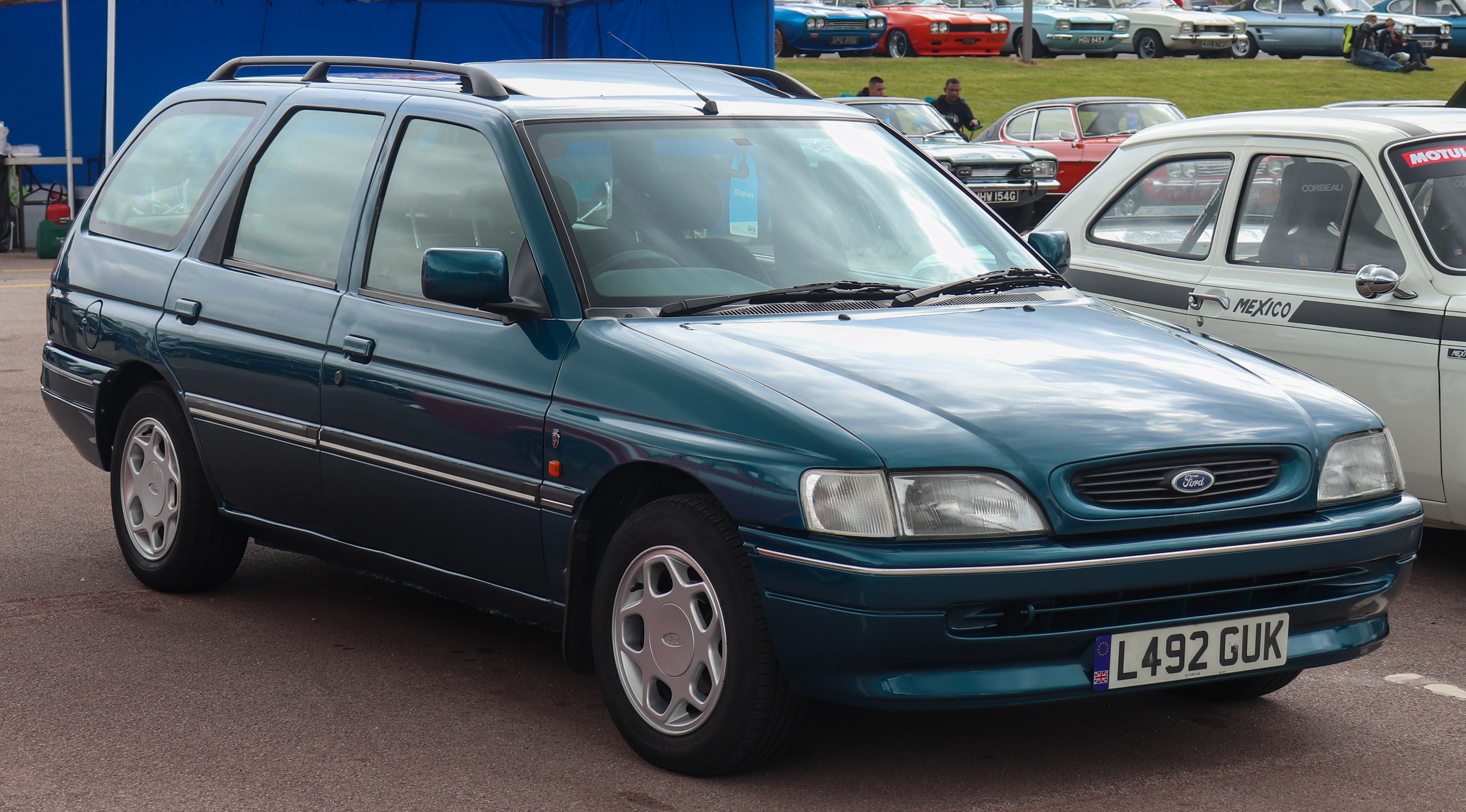
Facelifted Escort estate (Ghia trim level)

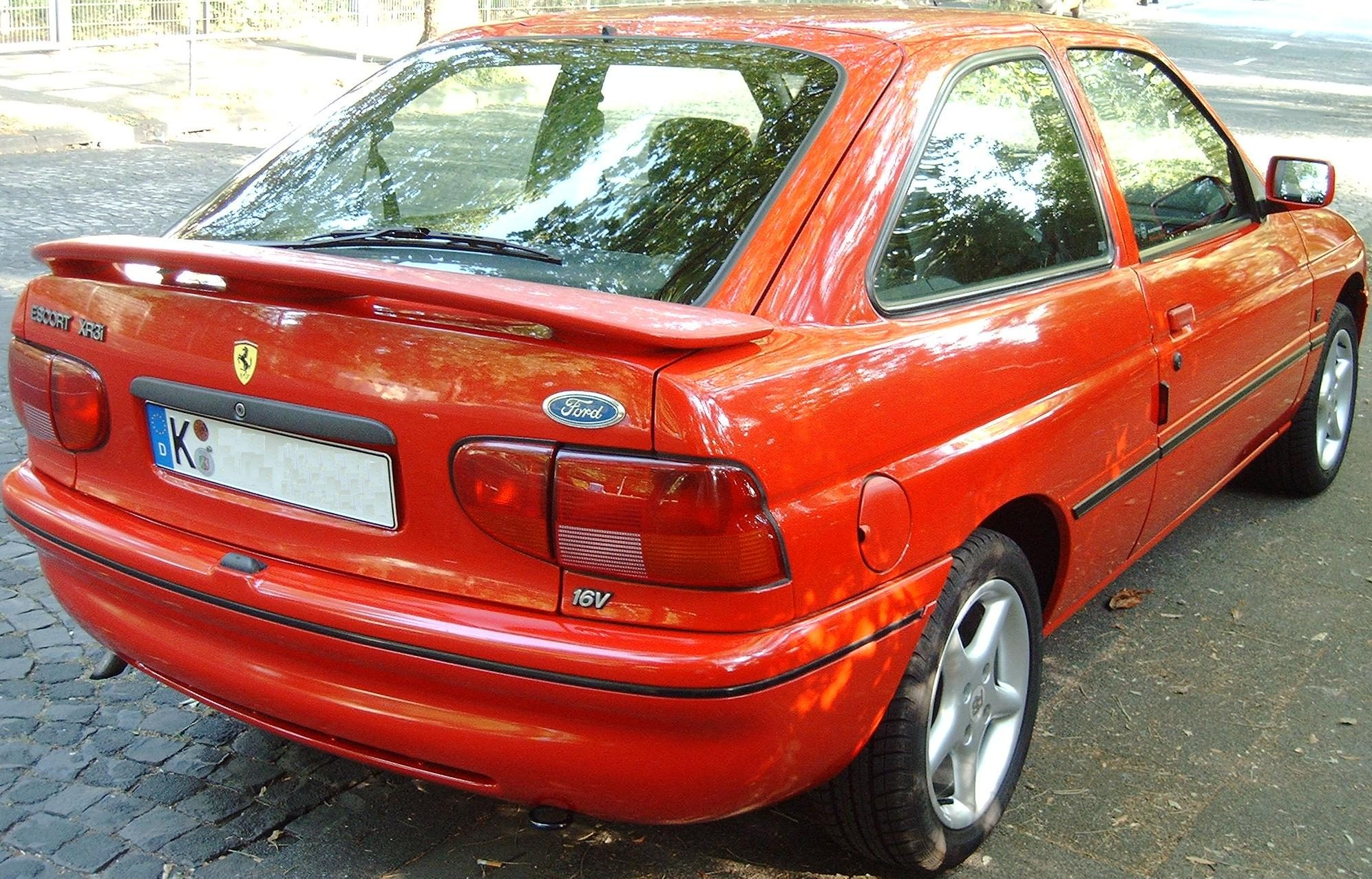
Facelifted Escort XR3i

== Sixth generation (1995) ==
Sixth generation
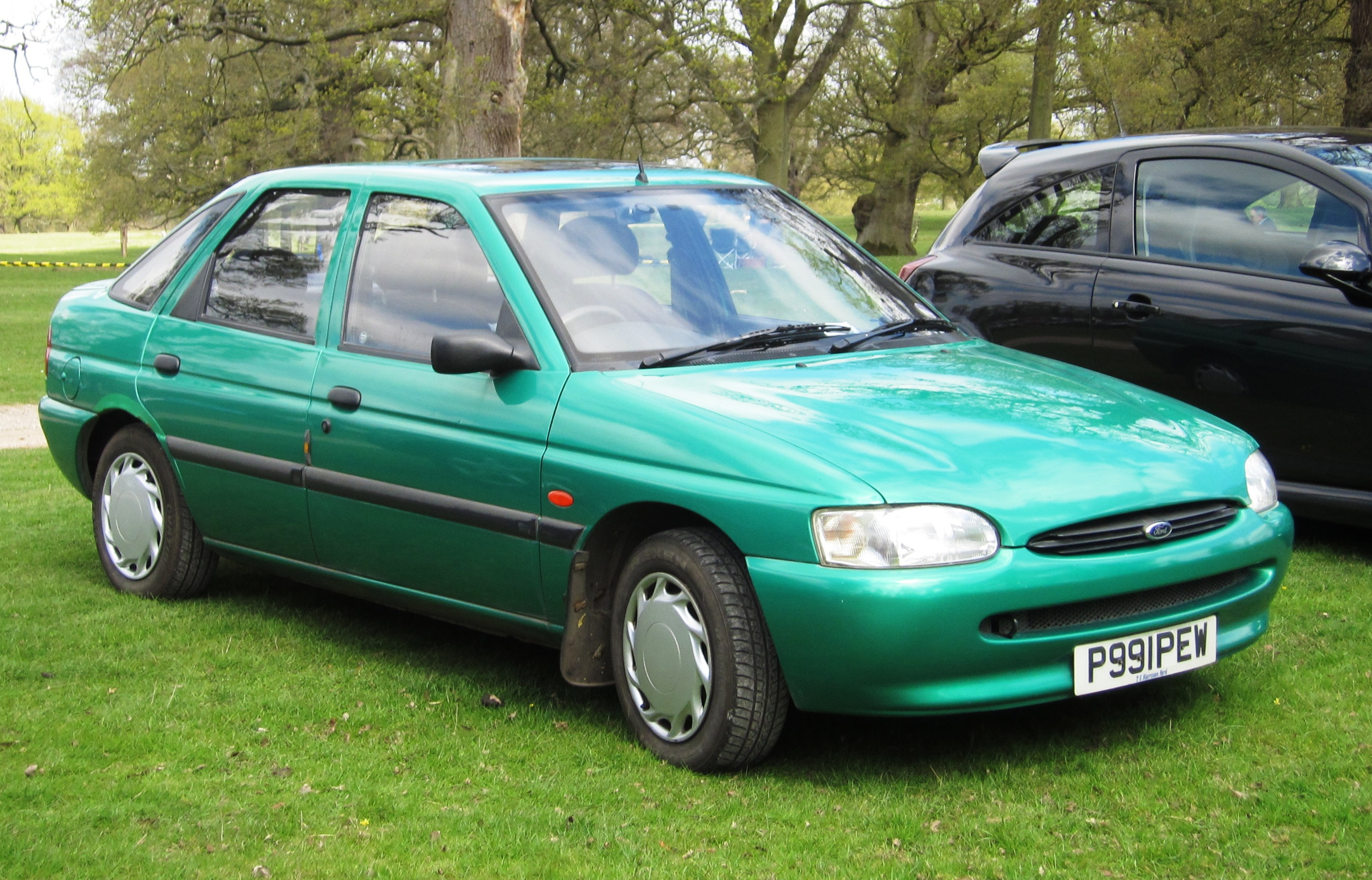

Overview
- Also called: Ford EuroEscort (Chile)
- Production: January 1995 – October 2002; 1996–2004 (Argentina)
- Assembly: United Kingdom: Halewood (Halewood Body & Assembly); Spain: Almussafes; Germany: Saarlouis (Ford Germany); Argentina: General Pacheco (Ford Argentina); Belarus: Apchak (Ford Union); India: Nashik (Mahindra Ford); Poland: Płońsk; South Africa: Silverton, Pretoria (FMCSA); Turkey: Istanbul (Ford Otosan)

Body and chassis
- Body style: 3/5-door liftback; 4-door saloon; 5-door estate; 3-door van; 2-door convertible
- Layout: Front-engine, front-wheel-drive/four-wheel-drive
- Platform: Ford CE14 platform

Powertrain
- Engine: 1.3 L Endura-E I4; 1.4 L CVH-PTE I4; 1.6 L Zetec I4; 1.8 L Zetec I4; 2.0 L I4 DOHC; 1.8 L Endura D diesel I4; 1.8 L Endura D turbodiesel I4; 1.8 L Endura D TDDi I4
- Transmission: 5-speed manual 3-speed automatic

Dimensions
- Wheelbase: 2,525 mm (99.4 in)
- Length: Hatchback: 4,136 mm (162.8 in); Sedan: 4,293 mm (169.0 in); Wagon: 4,300 mm (169.3 in)
- Width: 1,691 mm (66.6 in)
- Height: 1,398 mm (55.0 in)
- Curb weight: 989–1,140 kg (2,180–2,513 lb)

The Ford Escort was revised in January 1995, although it was still based on the previous model. This version had new front lights, bonnet, front wings, front and rear bumpers, wing mirrors, door handles and 4 different front radiator grilles (slats, honeycomb, circles and chrome). At the rear, the Ford logo moved from the right to the centre of the boot, except for the van and some convertible models, while the Escort badge had also changed. The interior of the car was hugely revised too following heavy criticism of the original 1990 car which featured low quality plastics for its interior mouldings – the car now featured an all new dashboard arrangement of competitive quality. However, the underlying car was now five years old and most of its rivals were either new or to be imminently replaced.

The two entry level engines were revised – the 1.3 L received the latest (and final) version of Valencia pushrod engine – the Endura-E from the recently launched Mk IV Fiesta and Ka, whilst the 1.4L CVH was replaced by the updated CVH-PTE unit. There were no changes to either the venerable 1.8 diesel or the 1.6/1.8 Zetec units at the top end of the range. The improved iB5 version of the venerable BC-series transmission was also later introduced as a running change.

Dynamically, the handling and ride were also much improved with revised suspension set up from that on the previous Mark V models. The sporty "Si" model had slightly stiffer suspension than the Encore, LX and Ghia variants, although the Si was otherwise the same as the LX with some additional standard, mainly cosmetic, enhancements such as front and rear spoilers (which were also available as options on the LX), sports seats and white-faced dashboard instruments. Some special trim levels of the Escort include: Calypso Cabriolet, Freedom, Serenade, Cabaret and Mexico.

The RS2000 models ceased production in June 1996, and were the last Escorts ever to wear the famous RS badge. The RS badge did not resurface until the Focus RS arrived in 2002. A new Ghia X model was introduced around 1996, which included air conditioning and a 6 CD autochanger as standard. Although the equipment of the Ghia below it was reduced, it was now more affordable.

The last "standard" model to be introduced in 1997 was the GTi – the only GTi-badged Ford to ever be sold in Europe. This used the same existing 115 PS (85 kW) 1.8 L Zetec-E engine found in other cars in the range, but included a body kit borrowed from the now cancelled RS2000 model, part-leather seats plus the standard fitment of ABS. The GTi was available in 3- and 5-door hatchback and estate bodystyles.

In Chile, to avoid confusion with the US-market Escort which was being sold alongside it, this generation was sold as the "EuroEscort" for several years.

=== Phaseout ===
In 1998, Ford announced an all-new car, the Focus, which replaced the Escort and superseded the "Escort" name that had been in use for 30 years. The Escort range was cut down to just "Flight" and "Finesse" editions, and sold for a further two years in parallel with the Focus. In the United Kingdom, all engines except the 1.6 L petrol and 1.8 L turbo diesel were dropped, as were the three-door hatchback, four-door saloon and cabriolet bodystyles. The range was also condensed in mainland Europe, New Zealand, South Africa, and South America.

The Flight cost £10,380 and offered electric front windows, a three-speed fan and a cassette player. For an additional £1,000 the Finesse added alloy wheels, air conditioning, a CD player, fog lamps and metallic paint. The more competitive prices managed to keep European Escort sales going until the last one rolled off the Halewood assembly line in July 2000, although remaining stocks were sold into 2001, making it the last Ford car to be assembled there. The plant was transferred to Jaguar that year for the new X-Type saloon, and following the later merger with Land Rover and the sale of the plant to Tata, Ford now only has a small presence at Halewood – retaining the transmission works at the site.

=== Van ===
The van variant remained in production in a facility located behind the now Jaguar plant at Halewood until October 2002 when the new Transit Connect model was introduced. The Escort hatchback and estate were produced in Argentina until 2004, having been sold alongside its successor (the Focus) during the final stages of production. Escort-based light vans had been offered since 1968, although the market sector, always larger in the UK than in continental Europe, dated back beyond the 1950s when successive Ford Anglias had been available with a van variant. After the demise of the Escort, Ford would be represented in this niche by the Turkish assembled Ford Transit Connect.

=== New Zealand ===
While it was never sold in Australia, this generation was however sold in New Zealand imported fully built up from the UK between 1996 and 1998 in all bodystyles including the van, replacing the Ford Laser. The hatch and saloon were replaced in 1999 by the Laser due to unfavourable exchange rates, the Focus being introduced to the New Zealand market only in 2003, whereas the Escort estate and van continued on sale on the local market until 1999 until stock from the UK dried up, the estate having reasonable success due to the lack of a replacement Laser wagon following the end of local production of the outdated 1980s KE Laser wagon in 1996. 1.6 or 1.8-litre petrol and the diesel 1.8 were available.

=== Engines ===
Model	Modelyear	Engine	Displacement	Power / rpm.	Torque / rpm.	Top Speed	fuel system
1.3 CFi/H Endura-E	1995–1998	OHV 8V inline-four	1299 cc	60 hp (45 kW) / 5000	101 N⋅m (74 lbf⋅ft) / 2500	153 km/h (95 mph)	petrol, fuel injection
1.4 EFi CVH-PTE	1995–1998	SOHC 8V inline-four	1392 cc	75 hp (56 kW) / 5500	106 N⋅m (78 lbf⋅ft) / 2750	169 km/h (105 mph)	petrol, fuel injection
1.6 EFi Zetec	1995–2000	DOHC 16V inline-four	1597 cc	90 hp (67 kW) / 5500	134 N⋅m (99 lbf⋅ft) / 3000	177 km/h (110 mph)	petrol, fuel injection
1.8 EFI Zetec	1996–1998	DOHC 16V inline-four	1796 cc	116 hp (87 kW) / 5750	160 N⋅m (118 lbf⋅ft) / 4500	196 km/h (122 mph)	petrol, fuel injection
1.8 EFI ZETEC	1996–1998	DOHC 16V inline-four	1796 cc	130 hp (97 kW) / 6250	160 N⋅m (118 lbf⋅ft) / 4500	200 km/h (124 mph)	petrol, fuel injection
RS2000 I4 DOHC	1996	DOHC 16V inline-four	1988 cc	150 hp (112 kW) / 6000	190 N⋅m (140 lbf⋅ft) / 4500	210 km/h (130 mph)	petrol, fuel injection
1.8 D Endura D	1995–1998	SOHC 8V inline-four	1753 cc	60 hp (45 kW) / 4800	110 N⋅m (81 lbf⋅ft) / 2500	152 km/h (94 mph)	diesel
1.8 TD Endura D	1995–1998	SOHC 8V inline-four	1753 cc	69 hp (51 kW) / 4500	135 N⋅m (100 lbf⋅ft) / 2500	163 km/h (101 mph)	turbodiesel
1.8 TDDi Endura D	1995–2000	SOHC 8V inline-four	1753 cc	90 hp (67 kW) / 4500	180 N⋅m (133 lbf⋅ft) / 2000−2500	172 km/h (107 mph)	turbodiesel

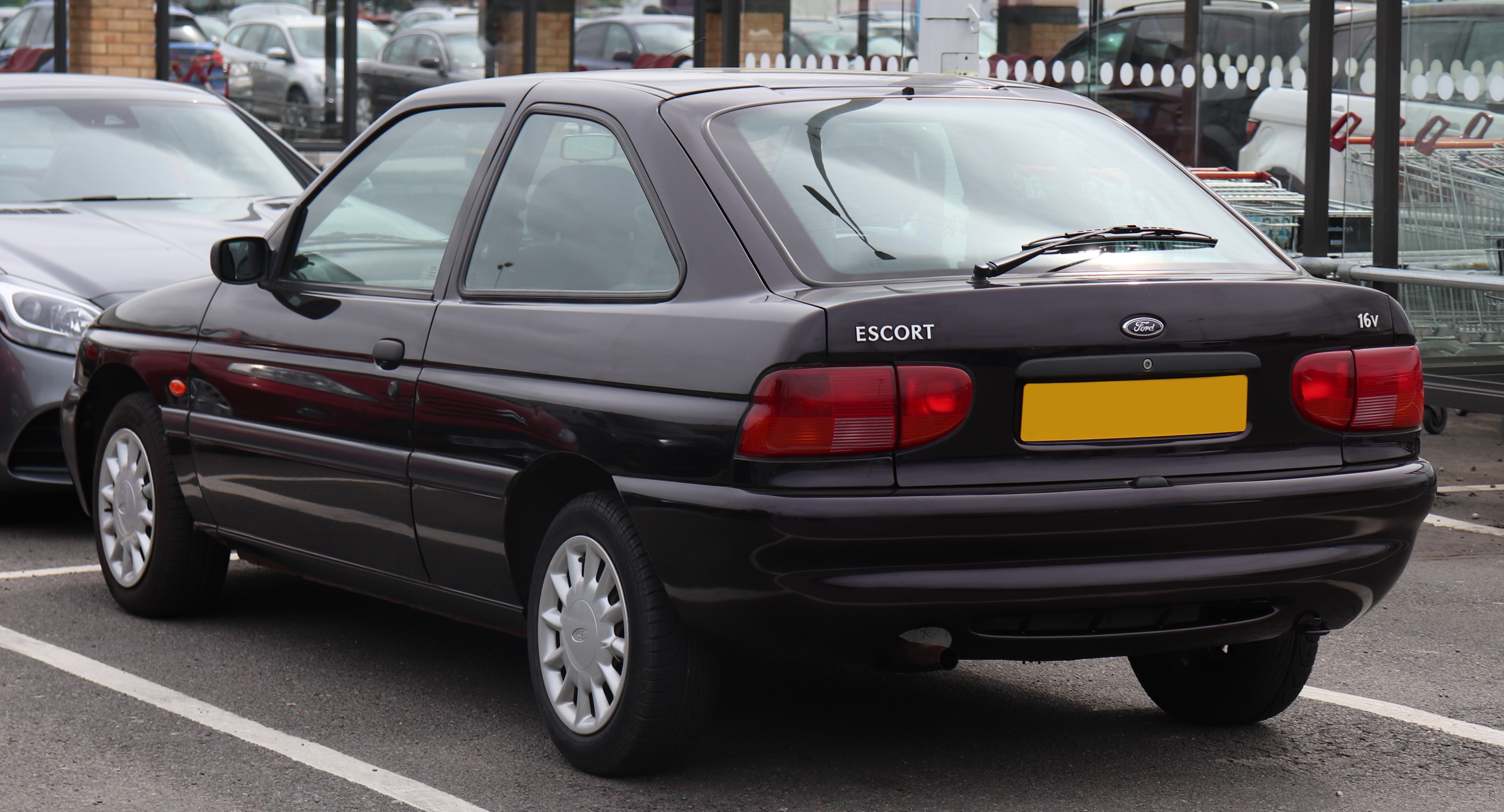
3-door hatchback (LX trim level)

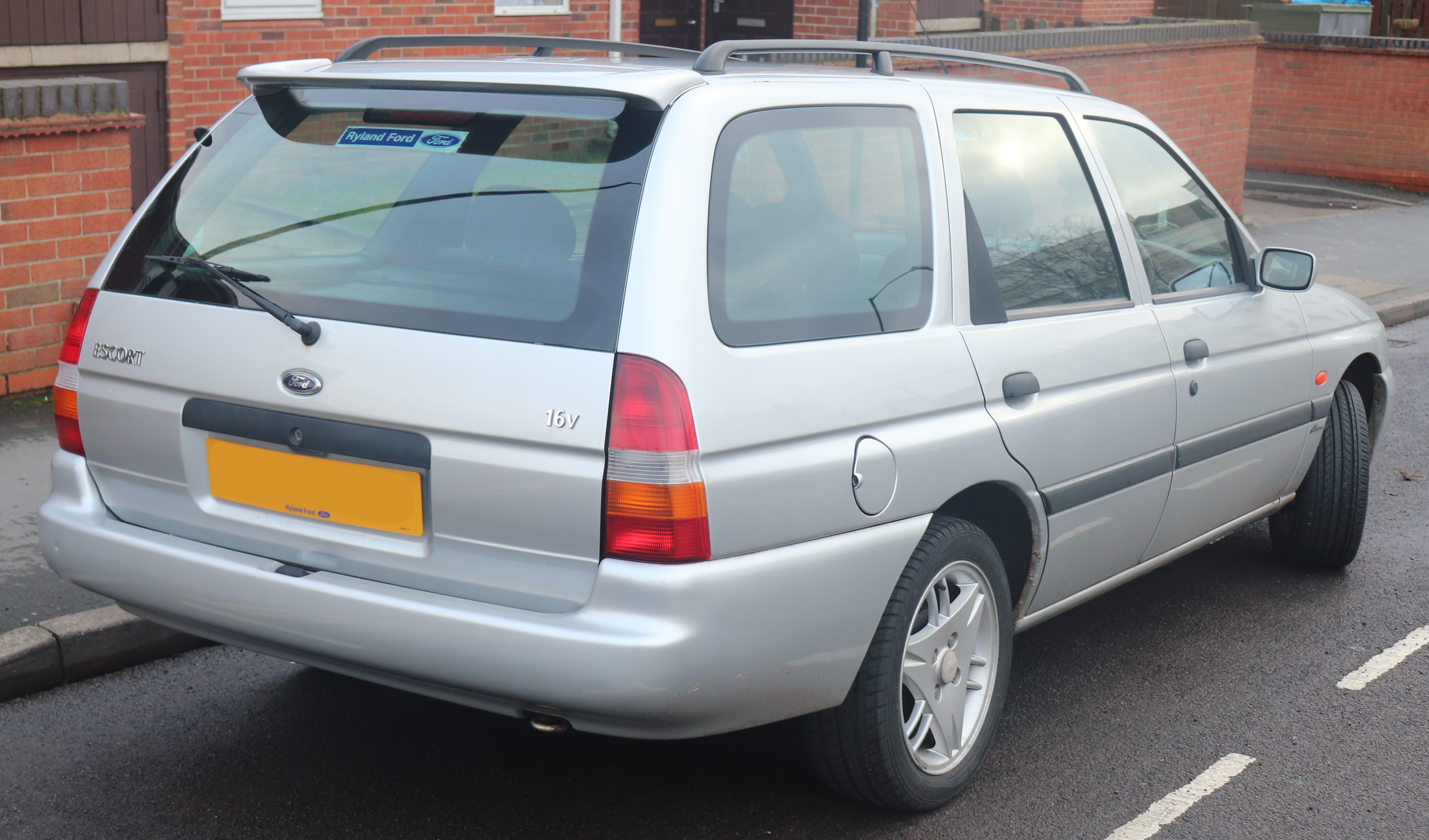
Estate (Finesse trim level)

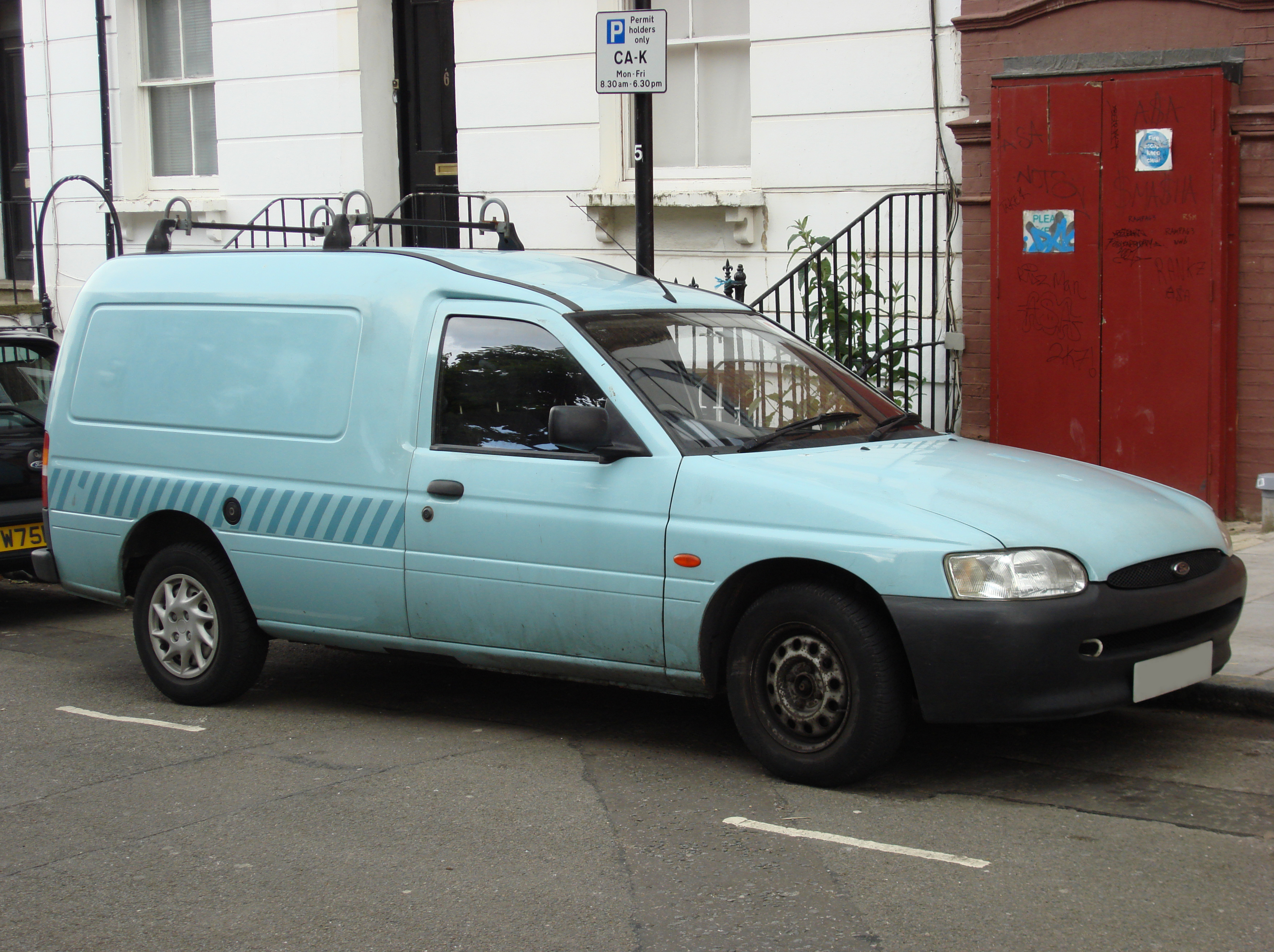
Van (1995–2002)

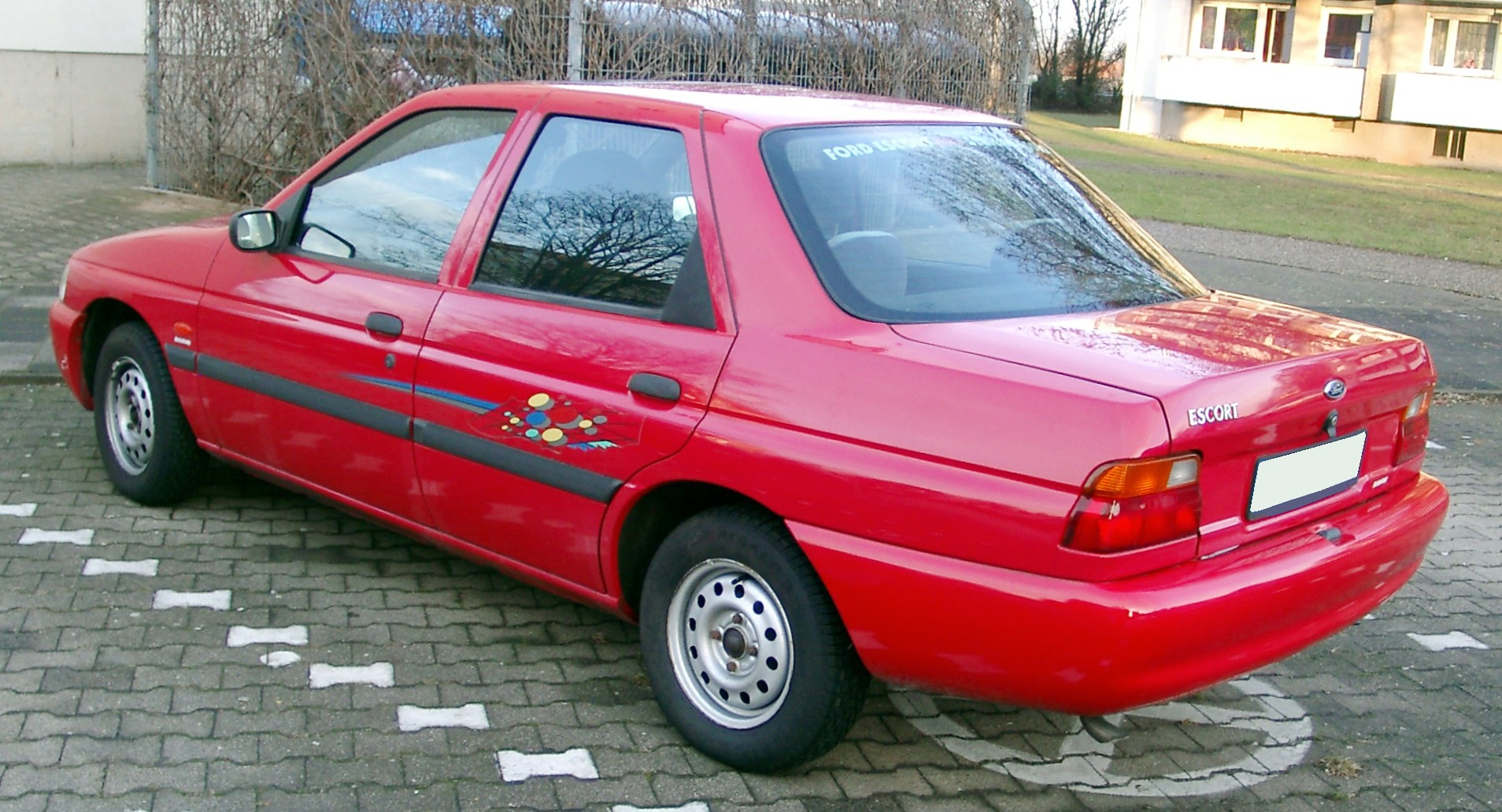
Saloon

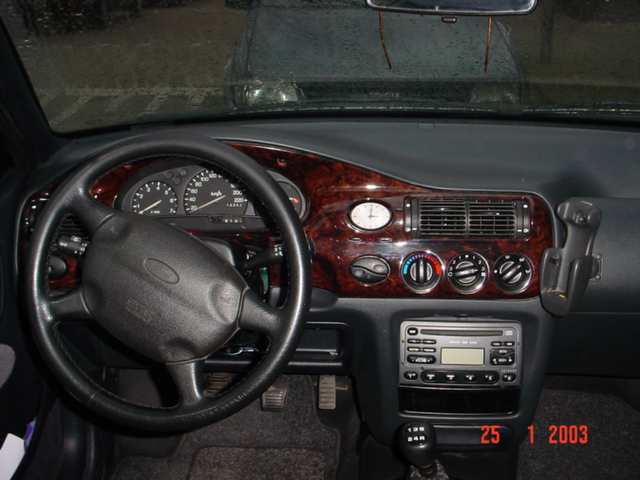
Interior dashboard of a Mk6 Escort

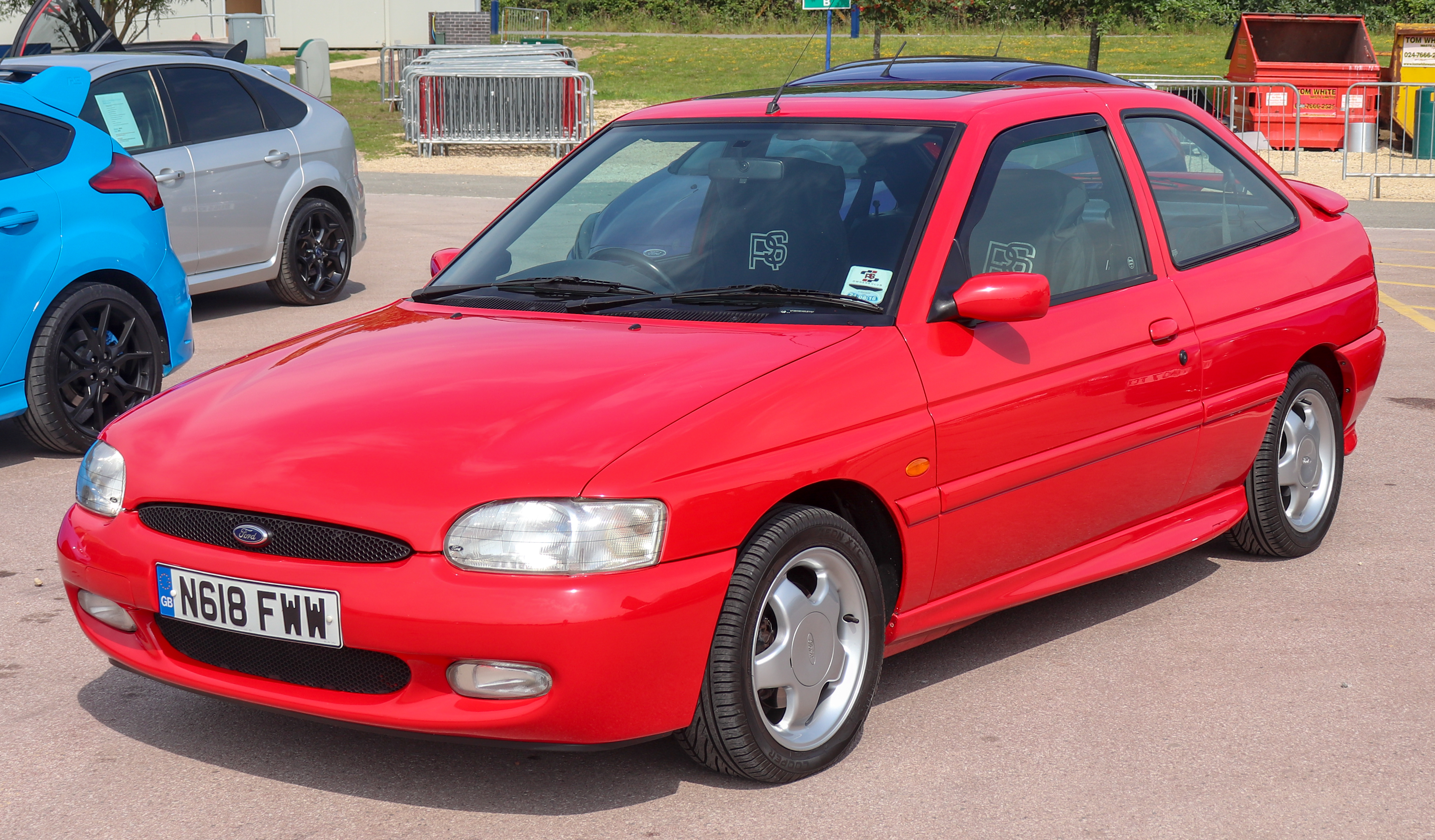
1995 Ford Escort RS2000. The last Escort to wear the famous RS badge.

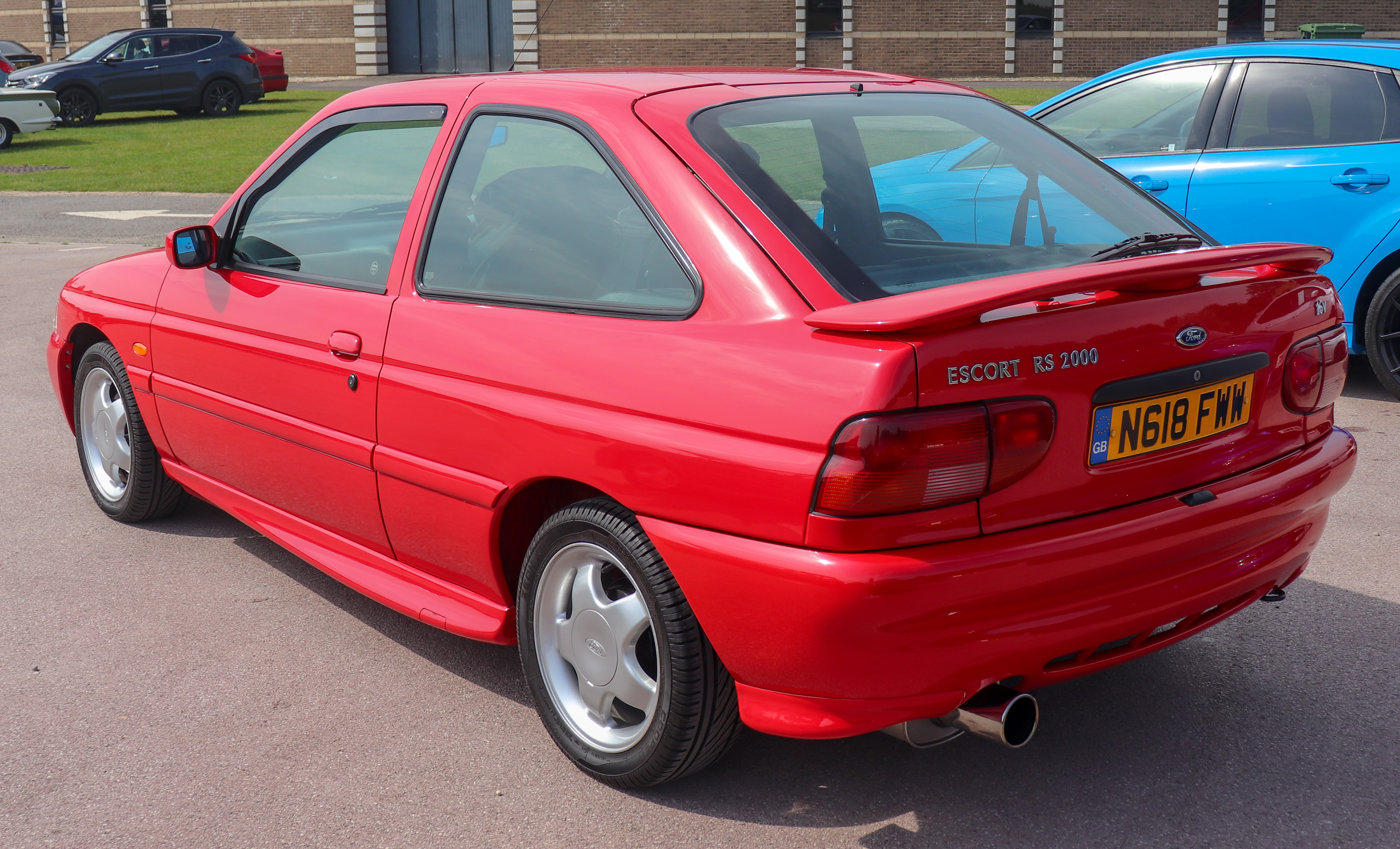
Rear view of RS2000

== See also ==
- Ford Escort RS Cosworth
- Ford Verona

== Bibliography ==
- Oswald, Werner (2003). Deutsche Autos 1945–1990, Band (vol) 3 (in German). Motorbuch Verlag. ISBN 3-613-02116-1.
- "Ford Escort in Israel". IsraelMotorIndustry.org.ford Britain .co.uk
