= Ford Fiesta (third generation) =

Supermini car, third generation of the Ford Fiesta

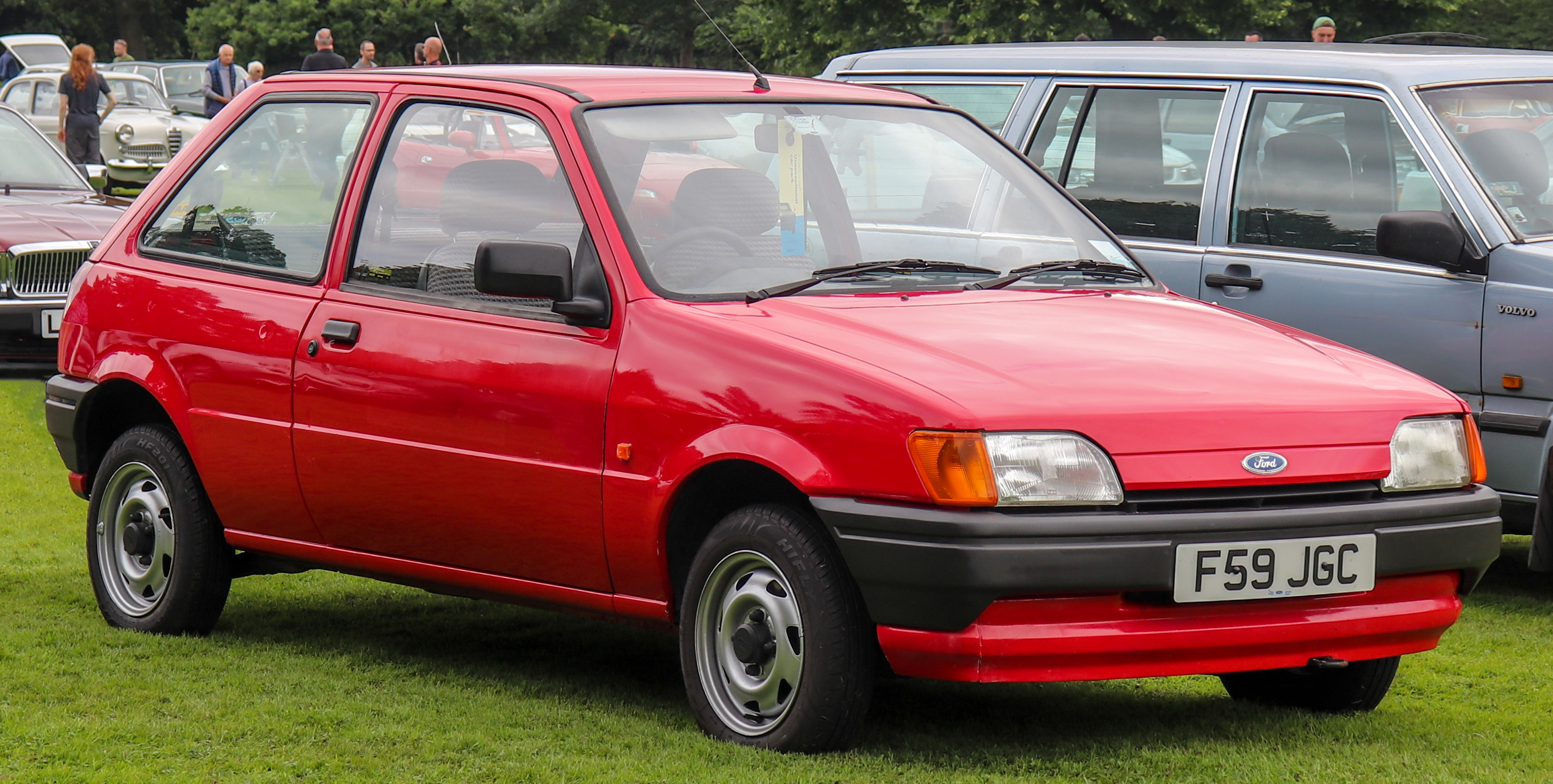

Overview
- Manufacturer: Ford Europe
- Also called: Ford Fiesta Classic (1995–1997)
- Production: February 1989 – February 1997
- Assembly: Spain: Almussafes (Ford Valencia); United Kingdom: Dagenham (Ford Dagenham); Germany: Cologne (CB&A); Germany: Saarlouis (SB&A)

Body and chassis
- Class: Supermini (B)
- Body style: 3/5-door hatchback 3-door panel van 3-door high cube panel van
- Platform: Ford B platform
- Related: Ford Ka; Ford Courier

Powertrain
- Engine: 999 cc HCS I4; 1,118 cc HCS I4; 1,297 cc HCS I4; 1,392 cc CVH I4; 1,392 cc CVH-PTE I4; 1,596 cc CVH I4; 1,596 cc CVH Turbo I4; 1,598 cc Zetec I4; 1,796 cc Zetec I4; 1,753 cc LT Diesel I4
- Transmission: 4-speed IB4 manual 5-speed IB5 manual CVT automatic

Dimensions
- Wheelbase: 2,446 mm (96.3 in)
- Length: 3,743 mm (147.4 in)
- Width: 1,606 mm (63.2 in)
- Height: 1,321 mm (52.0 in)

Chronology
- Predecessor: Ford Fiesta (second generation)
- Successor: Ford Fiesta (fourth generation)

The Ford Fiesta Mk3 was the third generation of the Ford Fiesta supermini built by Ford Europe. Originally introduced in 1989, the Mk3 represented the biggest change to the Fiesta since the original car was introduced in 1976. In addition to the 3-door hatchback and panel van versions that had formed the Fiesta range, a 5-door hatchback was also added. The Fiesta Mk3 was replaced by the Fiesta Mk4 in 1995, but remained on sale until early 1997. The Mk4 was a major restyle of the Mk3, but had a substantially re-engineered chassis and new engines.

The Fiesta Mk3 also spawned a high-cube panel van version in 1991, the Courier, and shared its platform with the Ka of 1996, which was derived from the Fiesta Mk4.

== History ==
The third generation Fiesta, codenamed BE-13 was unveiled at the end of 1988 and officially went on sale in February of the following year with UK sales commencing in April. The car was based on a new platform ditching the old car's rear beam axle for a semi-independent torsion beam arrangement and looked radically different, addressing the principal weakness of the previous generation – the lack of a 5-door derivative, something that was by then available in its major rivals such as the Fiat Uno, Peugeot 205 and Opel Corsa/Vauxhall Nova. The engine range remained broadly the same with the Valencia engine - now substantially revised and redesignated HCS (High Compression Swirl) - powering the 1.0L, 1.1L and 1.3L versions, and the CVH unit in larger capacities. The LT diesel engine was enlarged to a 1.8L capacity.

This model had the longest production life of any Fiesta to date, achieved the highest yearly sales of any Fiesta in the early 1990s – achieving a sales volume of 1 million units inside the first two years of production. A Fiesta-derived van, the Courier, was launched in 1991.

In the British market, Fuel injected engines only became available in 1991. They had been sold in countries with more stringent emissions controls since the introduction. The XR2i was initially the first and only fuel injected Fiesta sold on the UK market.

In 1992 a number of prototype cars were produced by Ford fitted with direct injection two stroke engines produced by the Orbital Engine Corporation of Australia, with full-scale production anticipated by Ford in "two to three years time". The cars were tested extensively in the UK, but ultimately it was decided not to go ahead with production versions. Major changes were introduced to the range in 1993; major structural improvements were made to improve safety, including the availability of airbags, as well as a new immobiliser being fitted to petrol models. Revised door mirrors were also fitted, as were a line-up of fresh wheel trim designs.

From 1995 the vehicle was built and sold at the same time as the new Mark 4. To distinguish the car, trim levels were revised, and it was marketed as the "Fiesta Classic", with a small range consisting of Classic, Classic Quartz, and Classic Cabaret models, and a ‘Special Edition’ Frascati model. Production of these models took place in Valencia, Spain. This version continued until production finally ceased in early 1997.

=== Commercial models ===
As with the Mark 2, this generation was available as a panelled van in many markets. This range offered a limited number of engines. From late September 1990 the van was also available with the new catalysed central injection (CFi) 1.4-litre petrol engine.

A box van version of the Fiesta appeared in the summer of 1991, but was sold as the Ford Courier.

=== Sporting variants ===
The mild Fiesta S was the first sporting version of the new Fiesta, arriving in the first half of 1989. It was available with two versions of the CVH engine; either a fuel injected 1.4 or a 1.6-litre Weber carburetted version without a catalytic converter. The S models had either 71 or 90 PS (52 or 66 kW; 70 or 89 bhp), respectively. The 1.6 S was manufactured until August 1991; it was replaced by a 16-valve, 1.8-litre engine with 105 PS (77 kW; 104 bhp) in mid-1992. The "proper" XR2i was launched in October 1989 with an eight-valve CVH engine with 104 PS (76 kW), when equipped with a catalytic converter. An uncatalyzed version was still made available for a handful of European markets; that model produces 110 PS (81 kW) at 5500 rpm. The XR2 was not as sharp a drive as its competitors, with numb steering and ponderous handling. Period reviewers did commend it for its amply sized cabin, comfortable finish, and sizable boot. The XR2i was nonetheless a strong seller in the United Kingdom.

The XR2 was then replaced by a Zetec 16 valve version in 1992, which also saw the RS Turbo being supplanted by the RS1800 as the CVH engine was being phased out. The RS1800 shared its engine with the 130 PS (96 kW; 128 bhp) version of the then-current Escort XR3i and had a top speed of 125 mph (201 km/h). The XR2i name was dropped in early 1994, and the insurance-friendly "Si" badge appeared in its place on a slightly less sporty-looking model with either the 1.4 L CVH-PTE (a development of the CVH) or the 1.6 L Zetec engine.

==== RS Turbo ====
The Fiesta RS Turbo was a performance model of the Fiesta Mk3. It was introduced in April 1990 and production continued until 1992.

Based on the XR2i, introduced a year earlier, it was visually similar. The main differences were 14" alloy wheels (an inch larger and of a different design than those fitted to the XR2i) with 185/55 VR14 Pirelli P600 tyres, green rather than blue stripe mouldings, colour-coded rear spoiler and door pillars, opening rear quarter windows, green tinted glass and RS bonnet louvres. Anti-lock brakes and a "Quickclear" heated front windscreen were options at extra cost.

Inside the car the differences included Recaro seats trimmed in "Ascot In Raven" material and a grey leather trimmed gear knob and a three-spoke steering wheel (as opposed to the two-spoke used in the XR2i), which also had the RS Turbo logo embossed on the centre cap.

The RS Turbo's CVH engine retained the same 1597cc capacity as the XR2i, but had a lower compression ratio of 8:1. The Garrett T2 turbocharger supplied 8 psi (55 kPa) of boost and was chosen as space between the engine and radiator prevented the use of the larger T3 from the Escort RS Turbo. As with the Escort, an air-to-air intercooler was fitted, although this was slightly larger on the Fiesta. The quoted power output was 133 PS (98 kW) at 5500 rpm, with 183 N⋅m (135 lb⋅ft) of torque at 2400 rpm which gave the car a top speed of 214 km/h (133 mph) and a 0-60 time of 7.9 seconds.

The car was not generally well received with reviews citing poor handling and uncommunicative steering as its weak points. The spiralling insurance premiums brought on by the British joyriding epidemic of the early 1990s did not help either, with the car being a popular target for thieves.

==== RS1800 ====
The Fiesta RS1800 was introduced as the replacement for the RS Turbo in 1992. The turbocharged 1.6 L CVH engine from the RS Turbo was replaced by a 1.8 L version of the Zetec engine, and had a similar claimed maximum power output of 130 PS (96 kW; 130 bhp).

Gallery

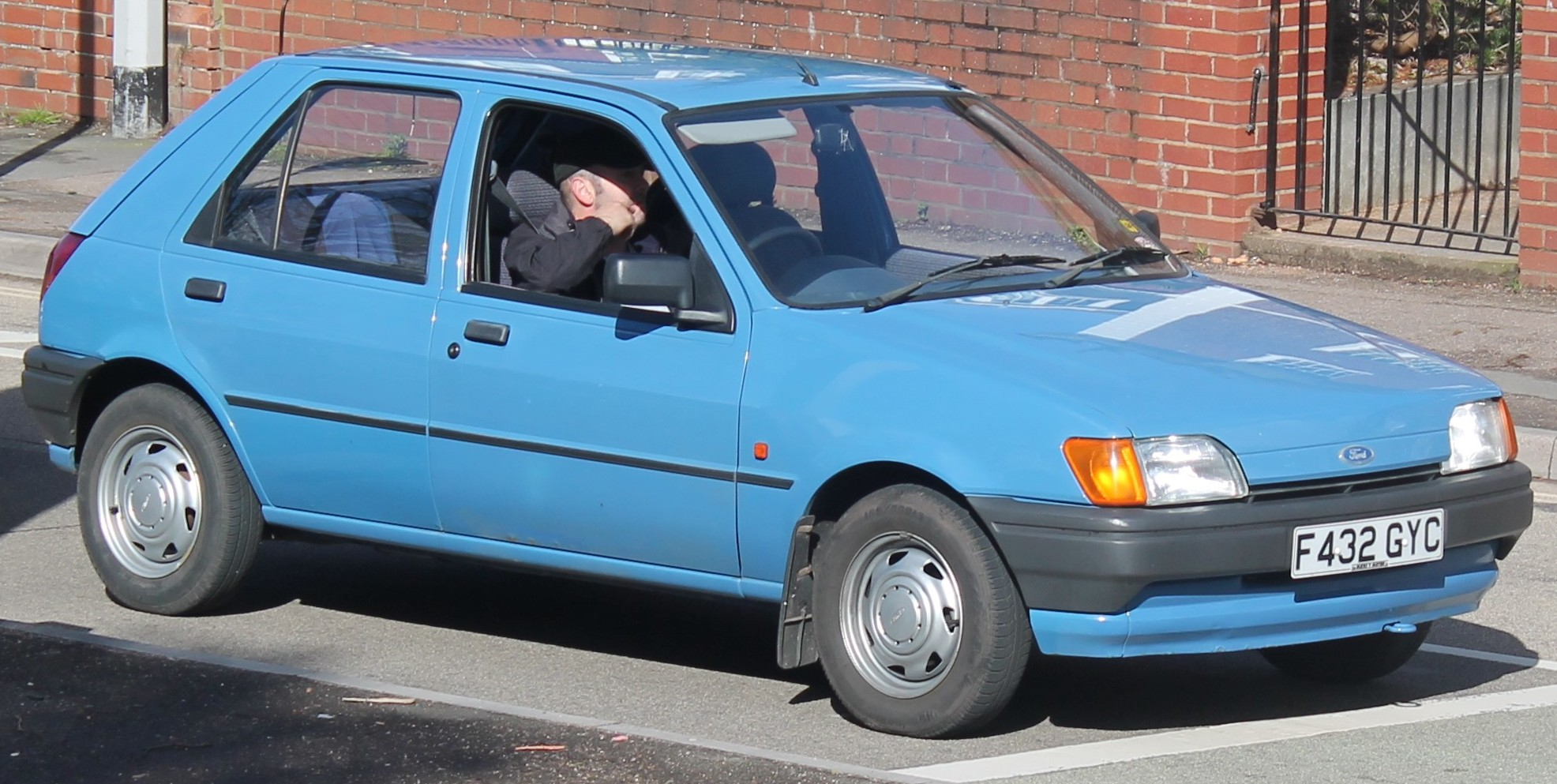
Fiesta 5-door front (pre-facelift)

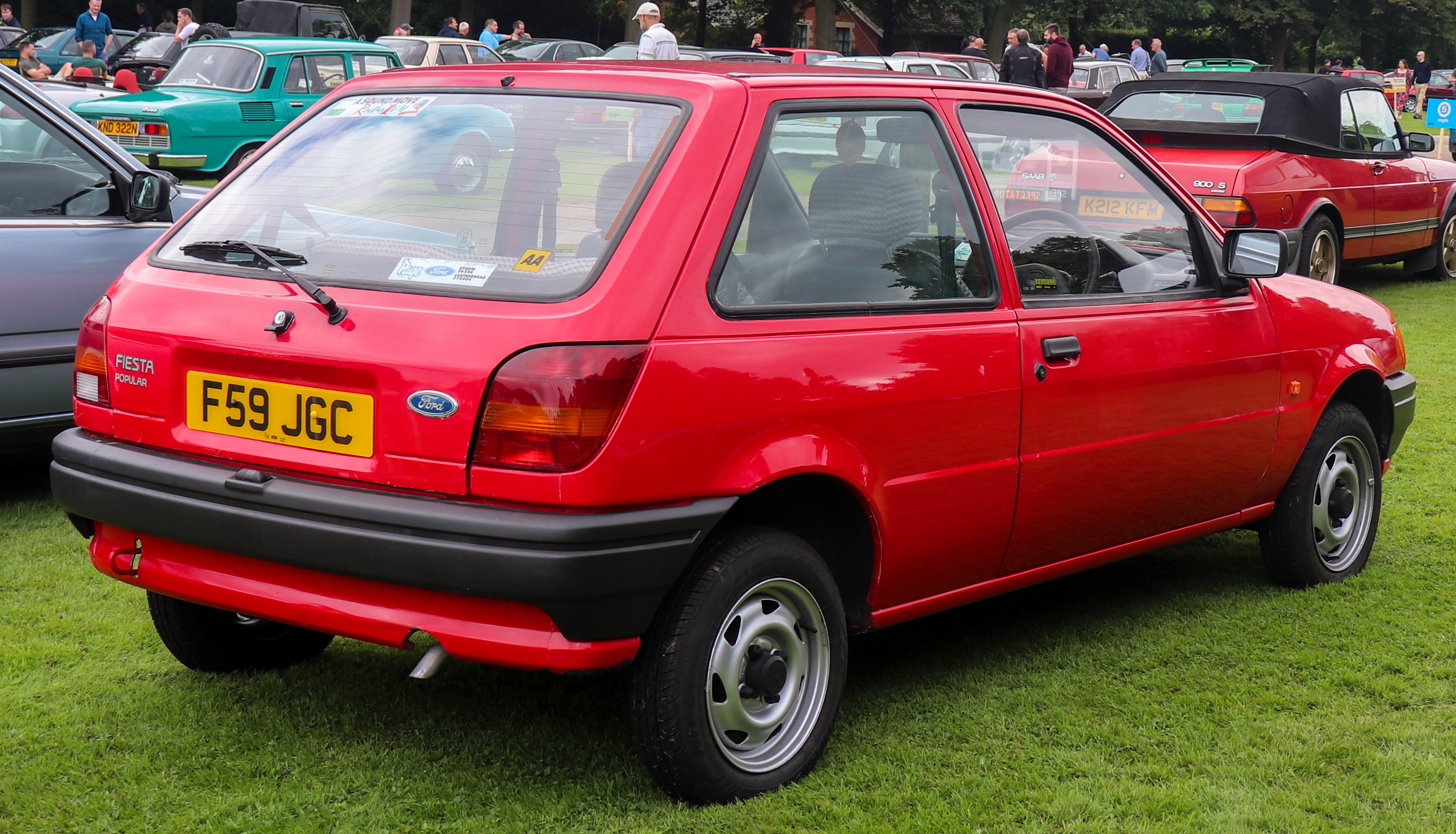
Fiesta 3-door (pre-facelift)

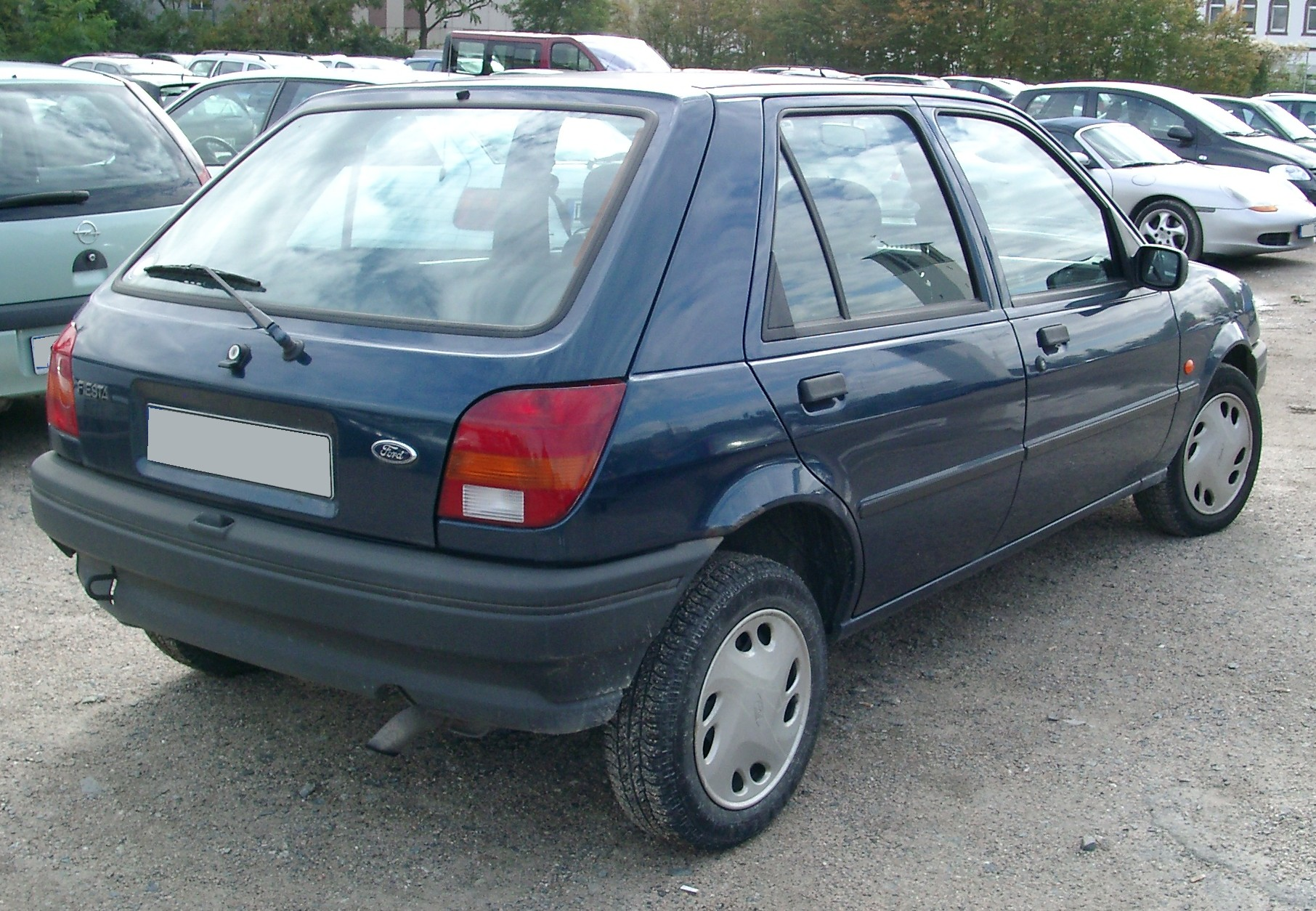
Fiesta 5-door (post-facelift)

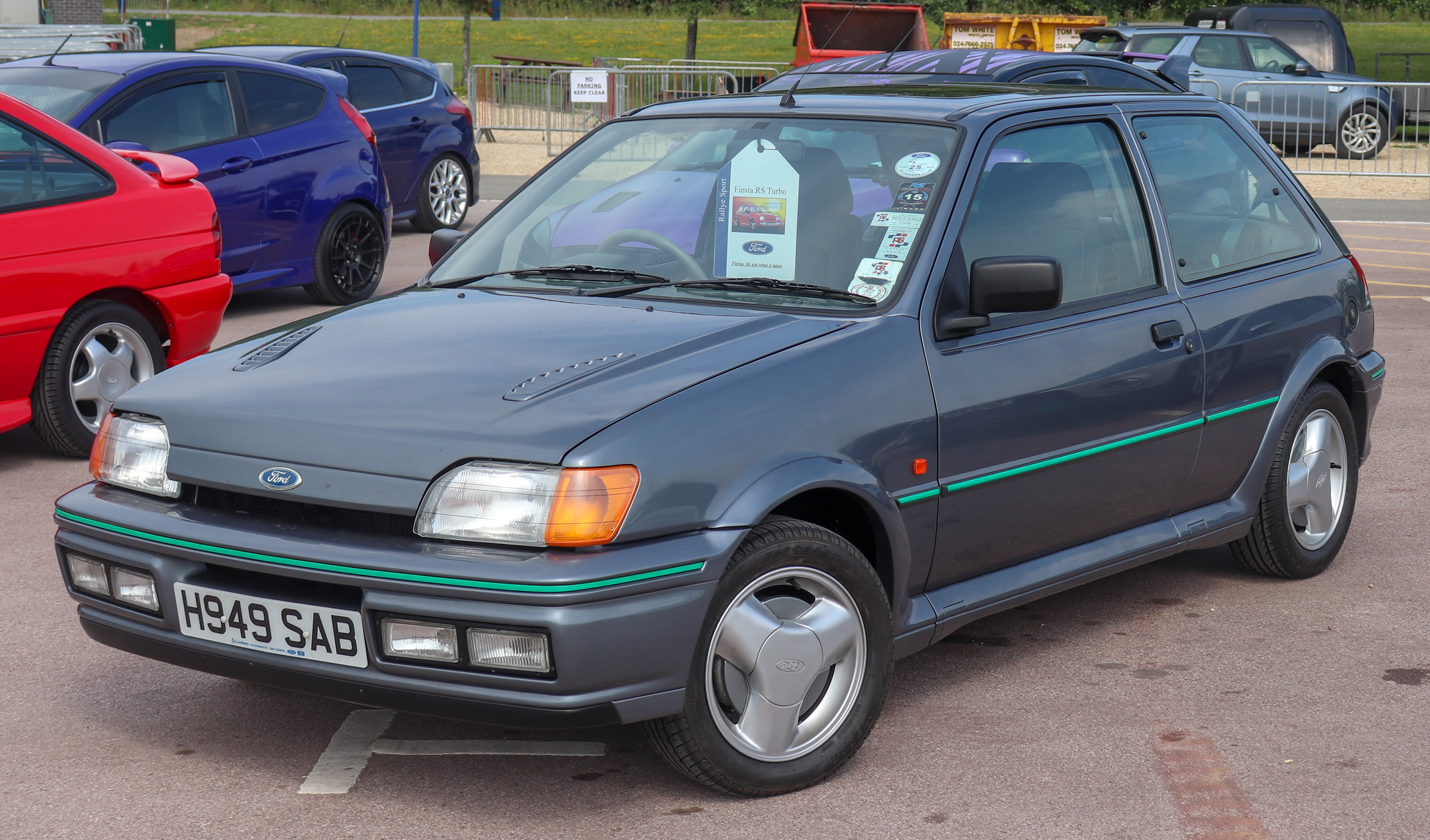
Fiesta RS Turbo

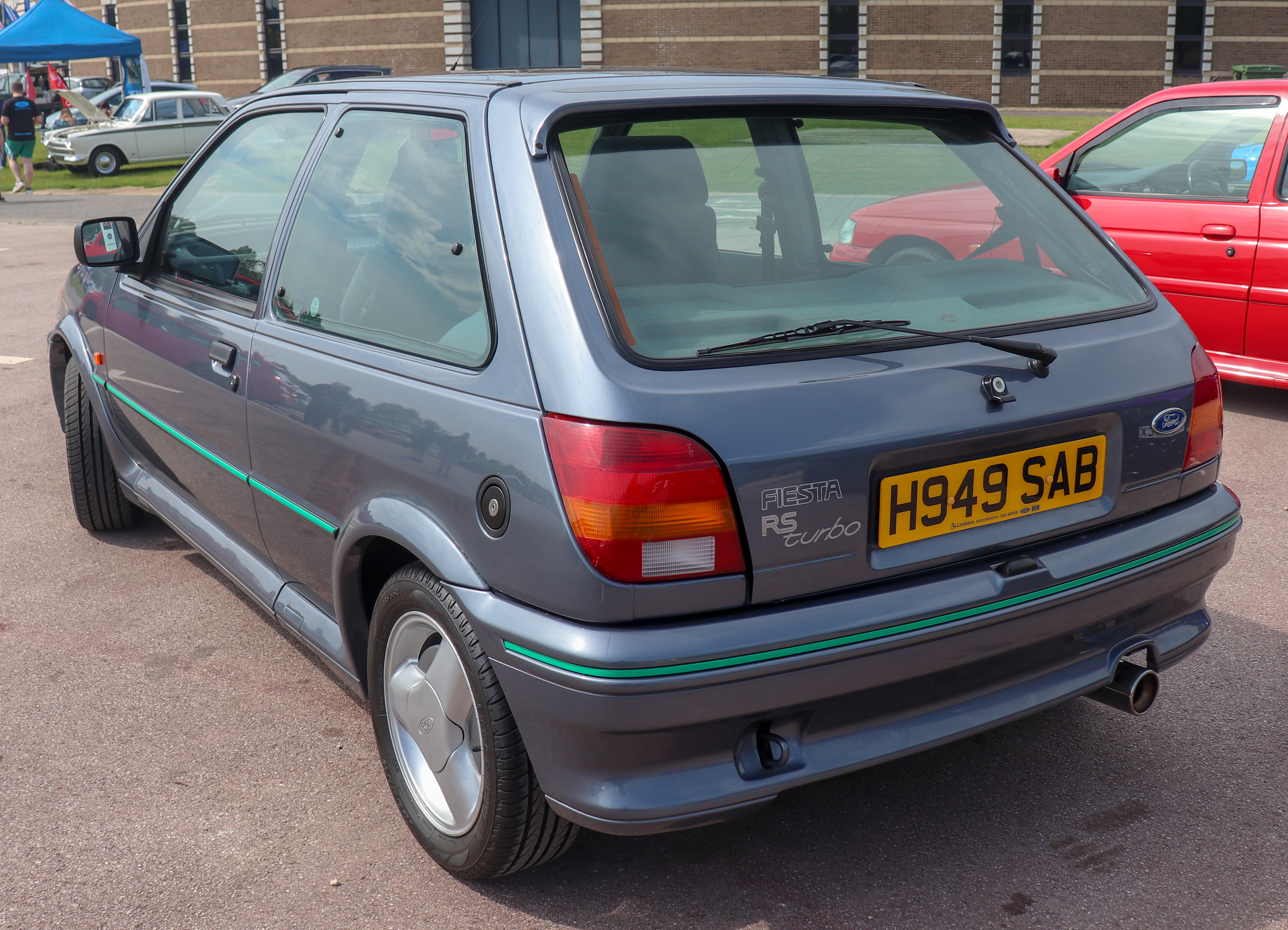
Fiesta RS Turbo (rear view)

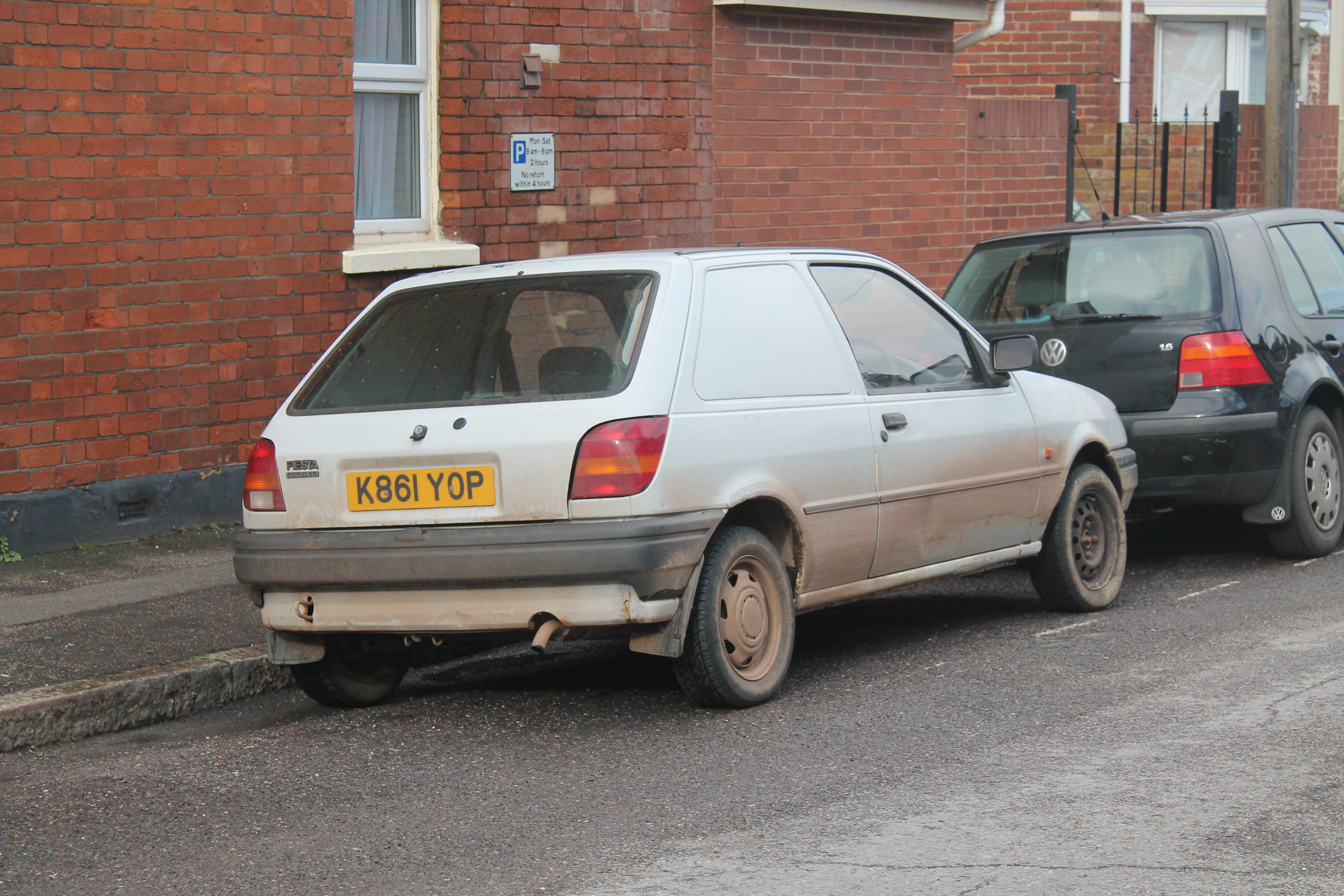
Fiesta Van

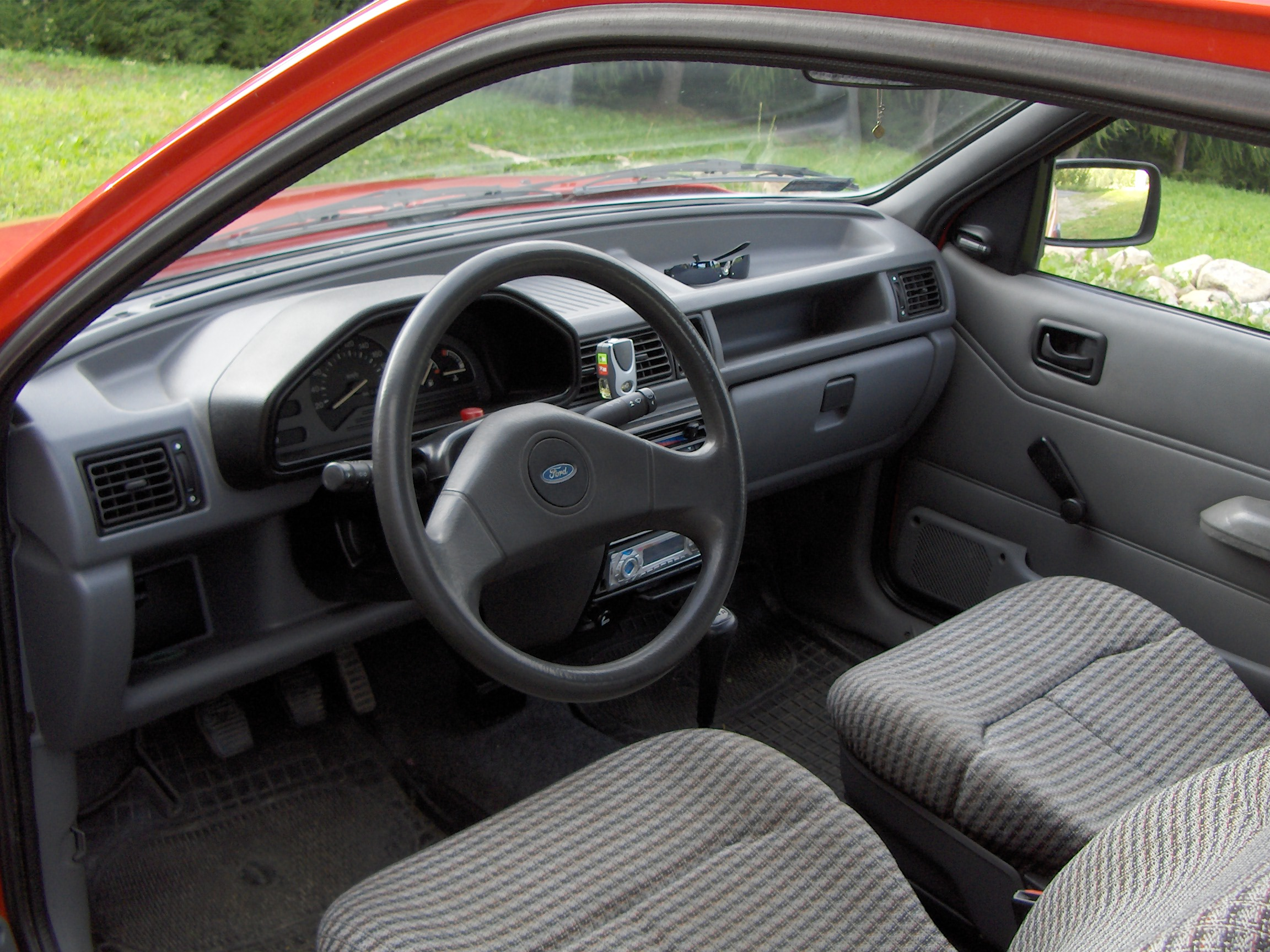
Interior

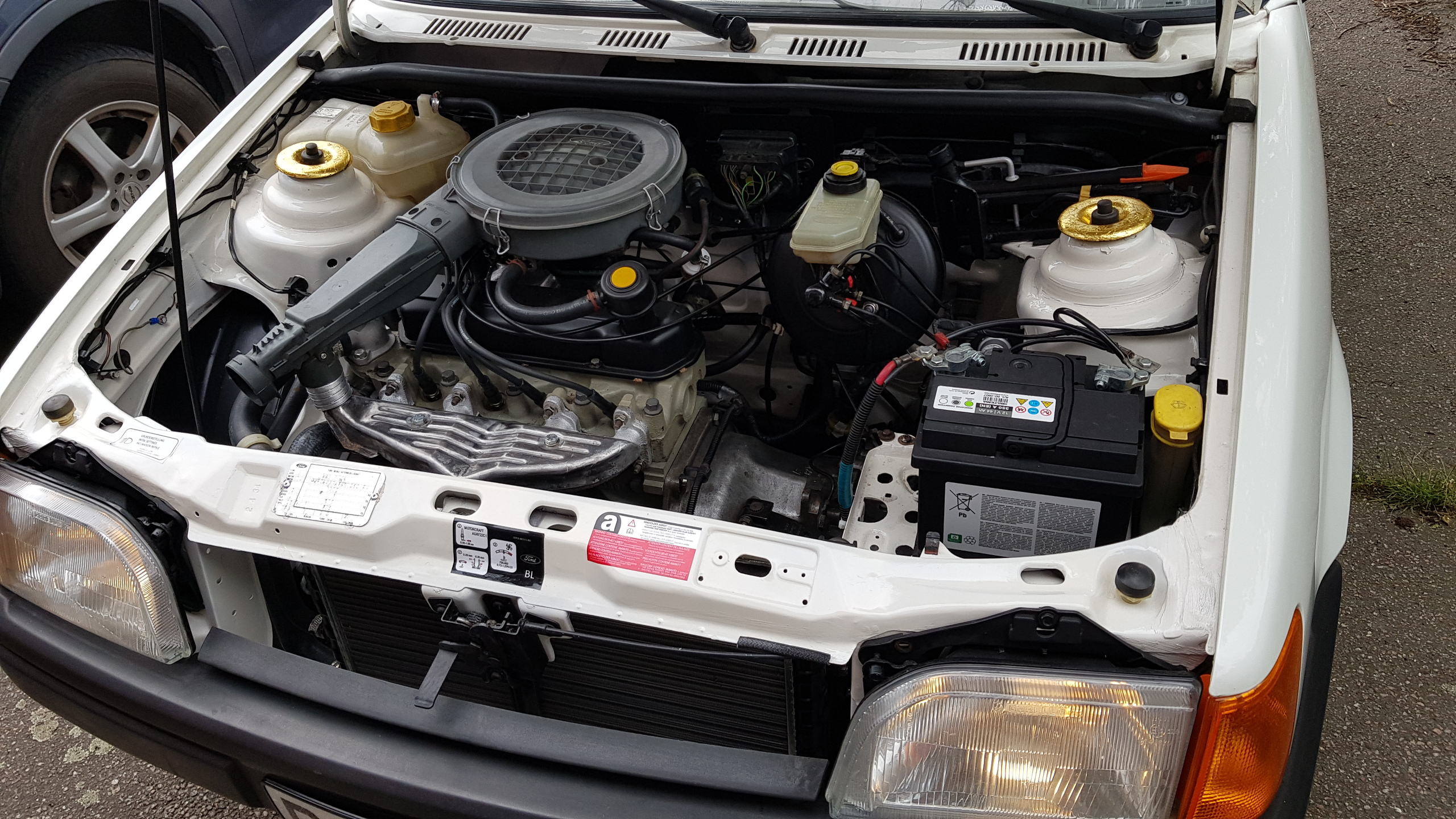
Engine bay 1.1 HCS Engine
