= Ford Fiesta (second generation) =

Supermini car, second generation of the Ford Fiesta

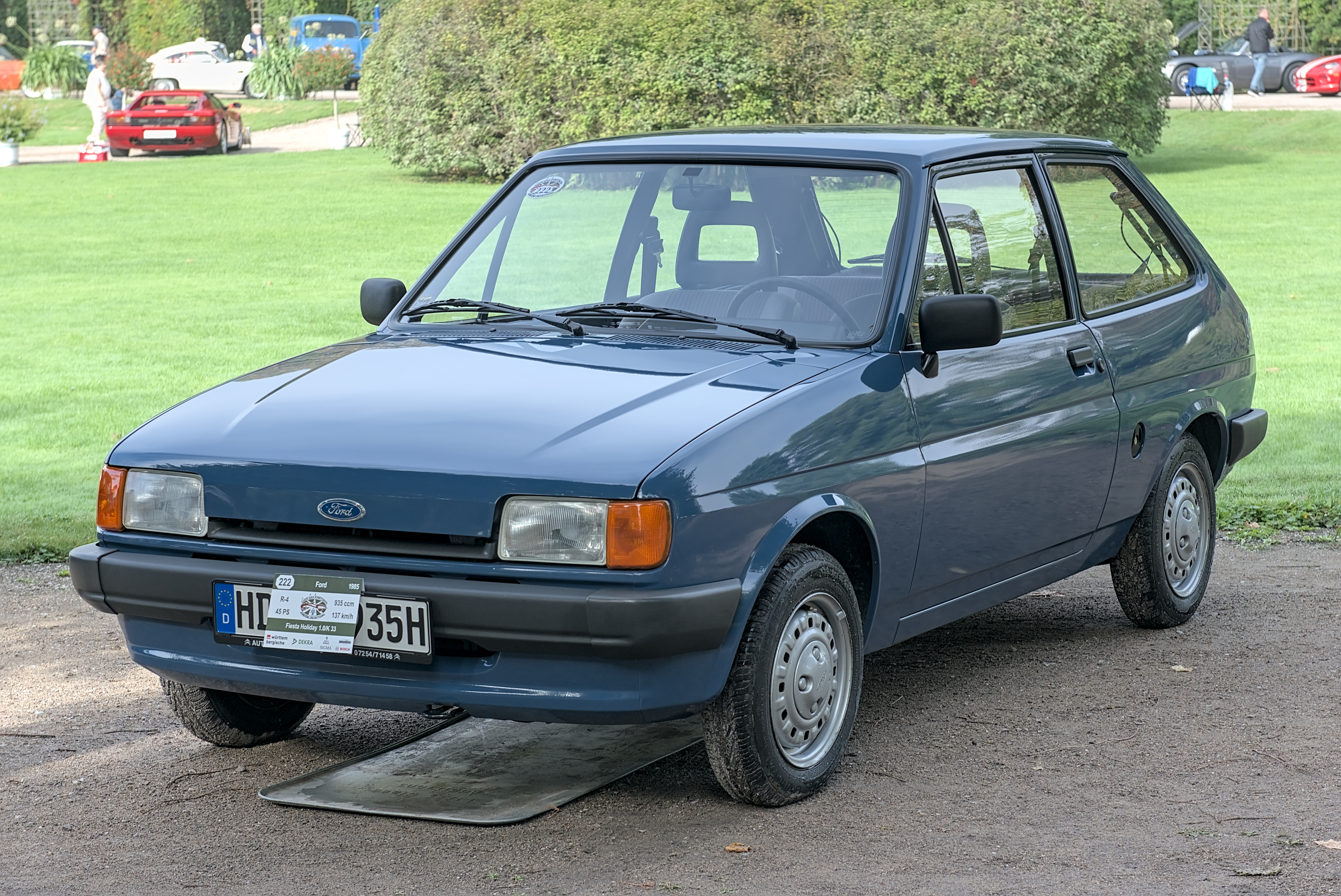

Overview
- Manufacturer: Ford Europe
- Production: August 1983 – February 1989
- Assembly: Spain: Almussafes (Ford Valencia); United Kingdom: Dagenham (Ford Dagenham); West Germany: Cologne (CB&A); West Germany: Saarlouis (SB&A)

Body and chassis
- Class: Supermini (B)
- Body style: 3-door hatchback 3-door panel van
- Platform: Ford B platform

Powertrain
- Engine: 957 cc (58.4 cu in) Valencia I4; 1,117 cc (68.2 cu in) Valencia I4; 1,298 cc (79.2 cu in) Valencia I4; 1,298 cc (79.2 cu in) CVH I4; 1,392 cc (84.9 cu in) CVH I4; 1,597 cc (97.5 cu in) CVH I4; 1,608 cc (98.1 cu in) LT Diesel I4
- Transmission: 4-speed BC4 manual 5-speed BC5 manual CVT automatic

Dimensions
- Wheelbase: 2,286 mm (90.0 in)
- Length: 3,565 mm (140.4 in)
- Width: 1,567 mm (61.7 in)
- Height: 1,360 mm (54 in)

Chronology
- Predecessor: Ford Fiesta (first generation)
- Successor: Ford Fiesta (third generation)

The Ford Fiesta Mk2 was the second generation of the Ford Fiesta supermini built by Ford Europe. Originally introduced in 1983, it was a mild facelift of the original car, with some re-engineering to accept an expanded range of engines and it was available in 3-door hatchback and panel van styles. It was replaced by the heavily updated Fiesta Mk3 for 1989.

== History ==
=== Initial development ===
The Ford Fiesta Mk2 appeared in late August 1983, with a revised front end and interior; the most notable change involved the new wraparound headlights. The front chassis structure was also widened, so as to accommodate a five-speed transmission and the CVH engines. The front track accordingly increased by 33 mm (1.3 in) (the rear track remained as on the Mk1), while the brakes and steering were also altered. The steering was a modified version of the Escort's setup, while the front brakes were updated with the Escorts' front discs. At launch, the Mk2 Fiesta was only available with the familiar 957cc and 1117cc Kent Crossflow-based "Valencia" engine options, although they now featured variable venturi carburettors for improved fuel consumption. The more bulbous bonnet line of the Mk2 was created largely due to the need to package the taller Ford CVH engine, a 1.3 L version of which followed in 1984, and this model also featured a five-speed manual transmission for the first time. The 1.0 was only offered with the four-speed at first, while the five-speed was available as an option in the 1.1.

Two other versions of the Mk2 Fiesta appeared in 1984; there was an updated XR2 model with a 1.6–L version of the CVH engine: the second generation Fiesta XR2 model came with a larger bodykit. It also featured a 96 bhp (72 kW) 1.6 L CVH engine as previously seen in the Ford Escort XR3, and a five-speed manual gearbox.

There was also a new 1.6 L diesel engined version of the Fiesta, making full advantage of the now wider engine compartment. Diesel power units in this market segment were still unusual, and commentators found that the impressive fuel economy of the diesel powered Fiesta came at the expense of a power unit that was noisy and rough. Even in West Germany, a market traditionally receptive to diesel powered passenger cars, the petrol/gasoline powered Fiesta was still outselling the diesel version by more than four to one in 1988. This may also have been because the larger engine, shared with the Escort/Orion, offered only marginal fuel savings over that of the smallest petrol options and at a considerably higher purchase price. When installed in the lighter Fiesta, though, this engine provided considerably spritelier performance than in the Escort Diesel. The Diesel Fiesta also had altered spring settings at the rear and received the Sierra's MacPherson struts up front to deal with the heavier engine.

=== 1986 upgrade ===
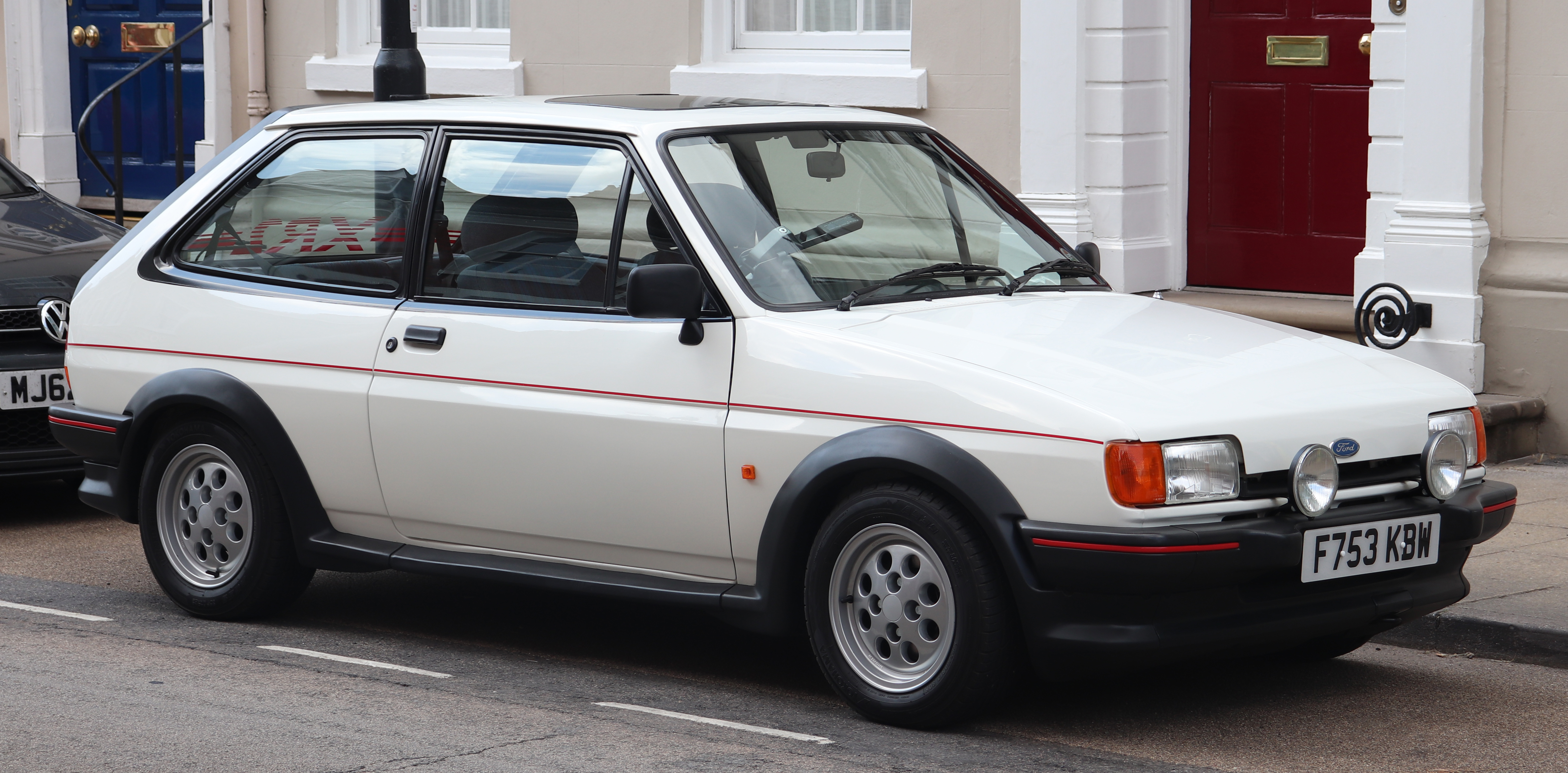

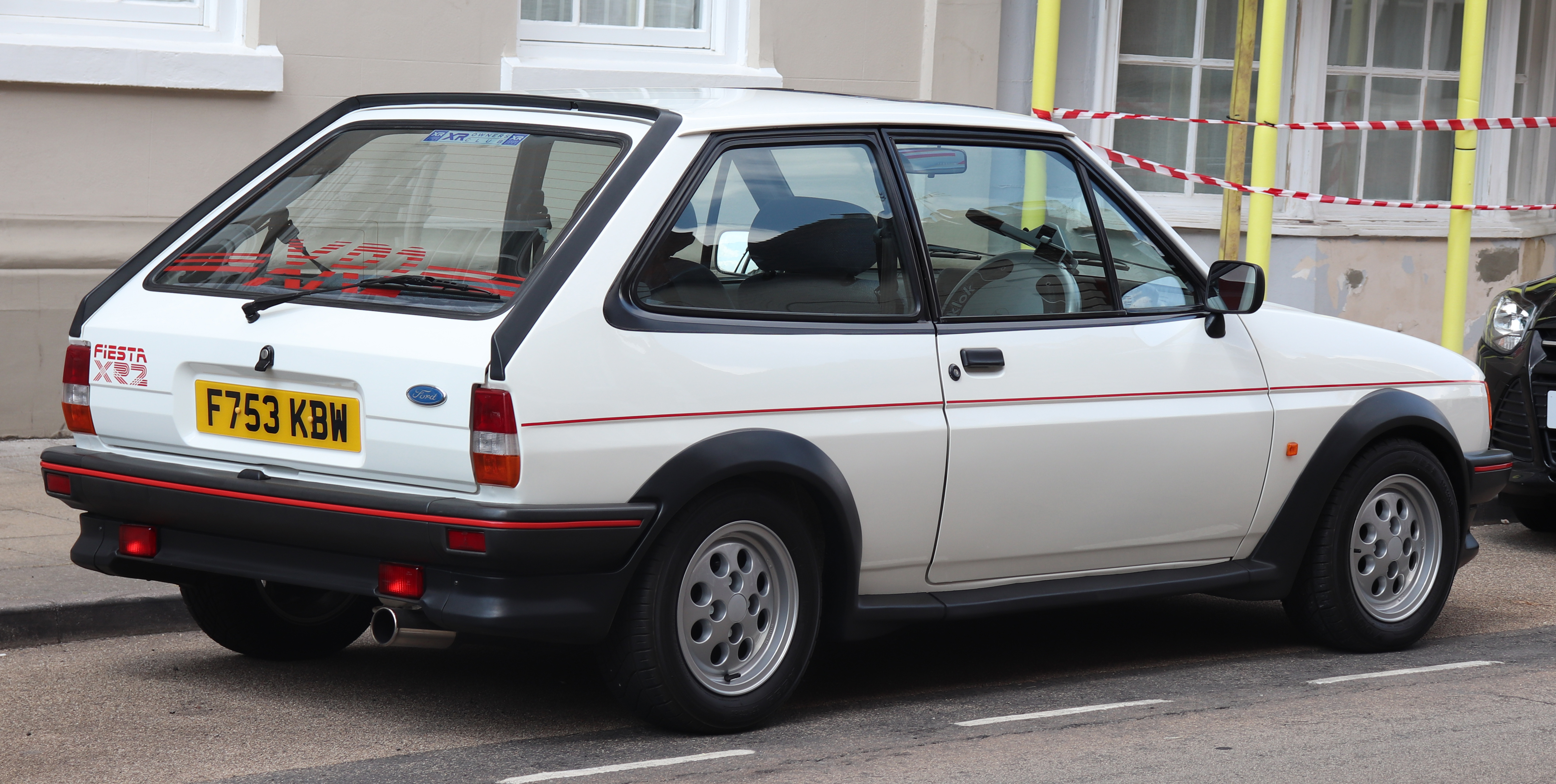
Ford Fiesta XR2

The XR2's engine was replaced by a lean-burn variant in November 1986 which featured a revised cylinder head and carburettor; this reduced emissions, but resulted in a small drop in power (although Ford still claimed the same maximum power output). At this point the manufacturer also took the opportunity to offer the 5-speed manual transmission, already standard on the 1.3 L model, as an option with the upgraded 1.1 L car.

The 1.3–L CVH was replaced by a 1.4–L lean burn version of the same power unit for 1986, whilst the other engines were modified in order to use unleaded petrol. In February 1986 all models received the 40 litre fuel tank, previously reserved for the XR2 model, increasing fuel capacity and range by 17%.

=== Fiesta automatic ===
In May 1987, Ford added the new CTX, incorporating continuously variable transmission, to the range, although it was only offered with the 1.1 engine, and relatively few of these Fiesta CTXs were produced.

== Sales ==
The Mk2 Fiesta, facing its stiffest competition from the Vauxhall Nova and Austin Metro, was Britain’s most popular supermini of its era. In its best-ever year, 1987, over 150,000 Fiesta models were sold in the UK, though it finished second in the sales charts to the Ford Escort, despite the fact that it was fundamentally an 11-year old design by this point.

In West Germany, then Europe's largest national car market, where larger cars are generally more popular, the Fiesta managed to outsell the Volkswagen Polo in 1984, 1985 and again in 1989, while the Polo narrowly outsold the Fiesta each year between 1986 and 1988. Throughout this period, West German sales of the Opel Corsa trailed those of both the Fiesta and the Polo.

By April 1989, when a new generation of Fiesta was launched, combined production and sales of the first two generations of Fiesta, produced between 1976 and 1989, had exceeded 4.5 million units.

== Specifications ==
Model	Displacement	Type code	Power	Top Speed	0-60 mph (s)	0–100 km/h (s)	Years
950	957 cc (58.40 cu in)	Valencia	44 hp (45 PS; 33 kW)	137 km/h (85 mph)	18.7		1983–1986
950	957 cc (58.40 cu in)	Valencia	44 hp (45 PS; 33 kW)	137 km/h (85 mph)	19.5		1986–1989
1.1	1,117 cc (68.16 cu in)	Valencia	50 hp (51 PS; 37 kW)	142 km/h (88 mph)	16.0		1983–1986
1.1	1,117 cc (68.16 cu in)	Valencia	50 hp (51 PS; 37 kW)	145 km/h (90 mph)	16.3		1986–1989
1.1 cat	1,117 cc (68.16 cu in)	Valencia	48 hp (49 PS; 36 kW)	142 km/h (88 mph)	17.1		1986–1989
1.3	1,296 cc (79.09 cu in)	CVH	68 hp (69 PS; 51 kW)	163 km/h (101 mph)	11.5	12.2	1983–1986
1.4	1,392 cc (84.95 cu in)	CVH	74 hp (75 PS; 55 kW)	165 km/h (103 mph)	11.4	12.1	1986–1989
1.4 cat	1,392 cc (84.95 cu in)	CVH	69 hp (70 PS; 51 kW)	161 km/h (100 mph)	12.3		1986–1987
1.4 cat	1,392 cc (84.95 cu in)	CVH	70 hp (71 PS; 52 kW)	163 km/h (101 mph)	12.3		1987–1989
1.6 D	1,608 cc (98.13 cu in)	LT	53 hp (54 PS; 40 kW)	148 km/h (92 mph)	16.3	17.3	1984–1989
1.6 XR2	1,597 cc (97.45 cu in)	CVH	95 hp (96 PS; 71 kW)	180 km/h (112 mph)	9.4		1984–1986
1.6 XR2	1,597 cc (97.45 cu in)	CVH	94 hp (95 PS; 70 kW)	180 km/h (112 mph)	9.7	9.9	1986–1989
1.6 XR2 (Sweden, Switzerland)	1,597 cc (97.45 cu in)	CVH	78 hp (79 PS; 58 kW)	166 km/h (103 mph)		11.8	1986–1989

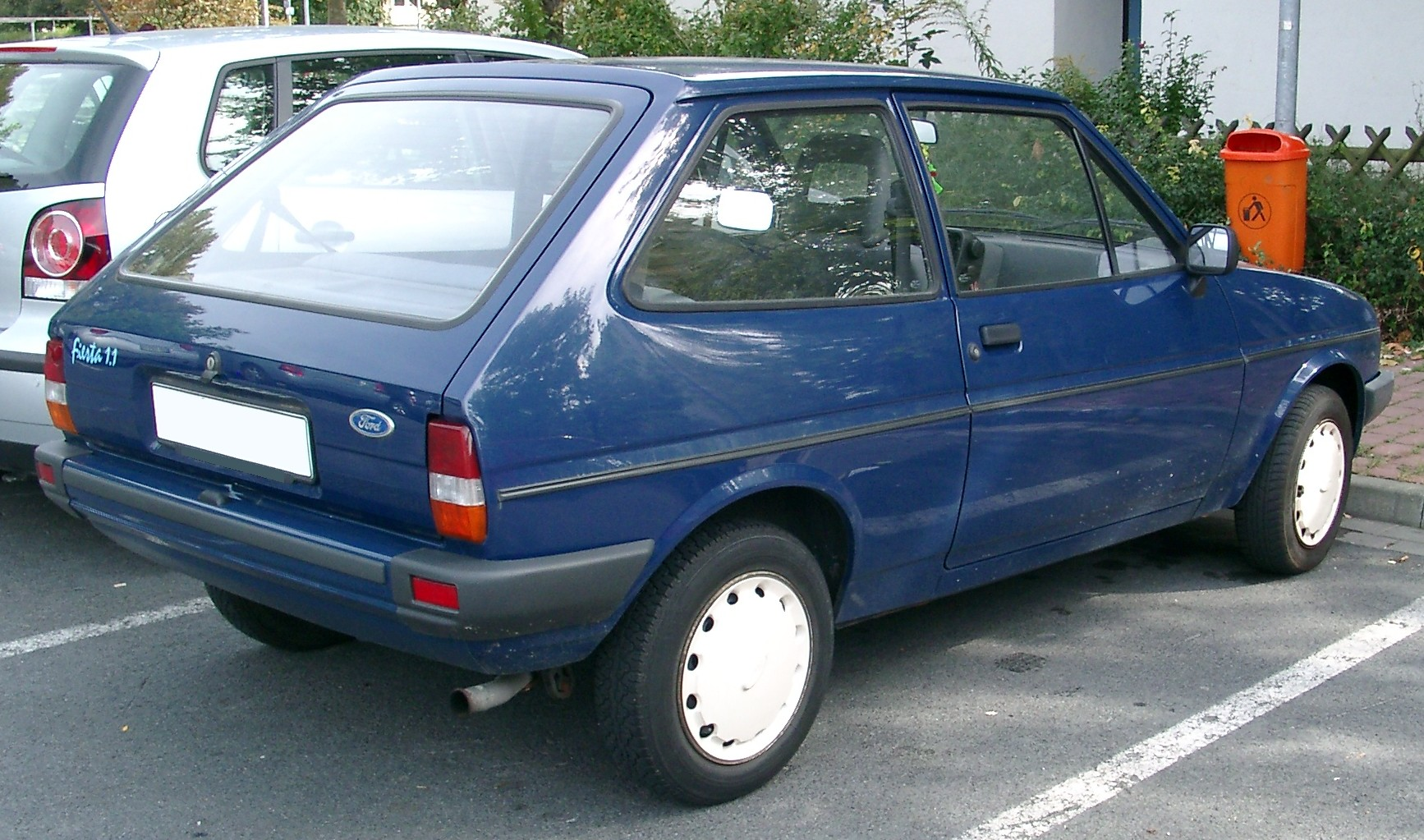
Ford Fiesta Mk2 rear

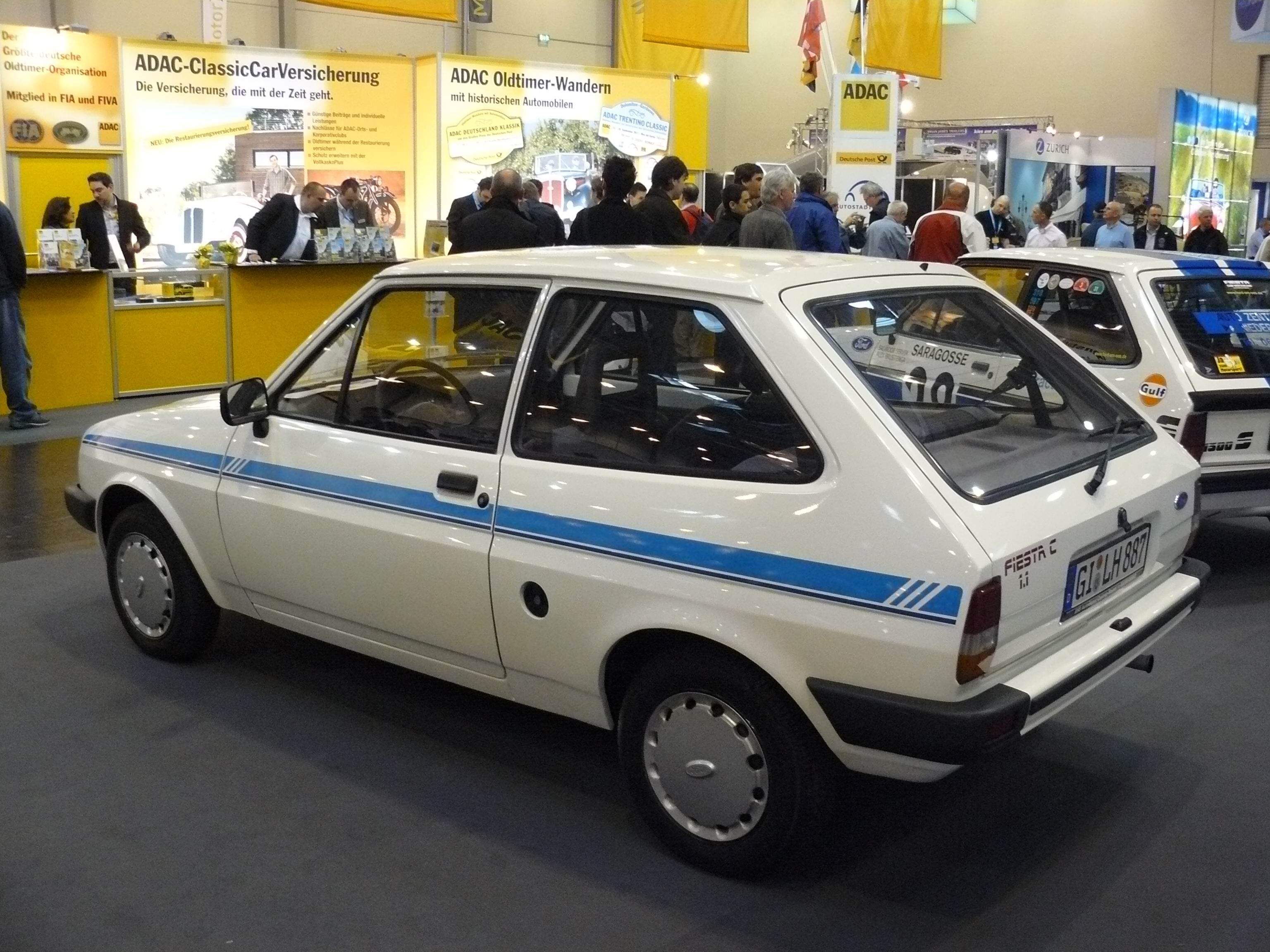
Ford Fiesta C 1.1 Mk2
