= Ford BC-series transmission =

The BC-series manual transmissions are a range of manual transaxles produced by Ford in Europe for its front-wheel-drive automobiles from 1972 onwards. Originally debuting in the Mk.1 Ford Fiesta, the unit was later used in Ford's other front-wheel-drive vehicles, most notably the Ford Escort and Orion.

The unit features a 20mm x 17 spline input shaft, uses a rod-based shift linkage and was originally only available in 4-speed format, designated as BC4, and designed to mate either with the Valencia version of the OHV Ford Kent engine, or the CVH unit. The 5-speed BC5 version appeared in 1982 on the Escort as a standard fitment on 1.6 litre cars, and as an option on 1.3 models, and became available on the Fiesta Mk2 in 1983.

== Known Issues ==
- The differential bearings are prone to collapsing on early build units, resulting in the driveshaft CV joint grinding the gearbox casing away, and leading to complete failure. The early signs of this is that the speedometer drive fails.
- The oil level plug on early units has a bolt head, can easily strip the threads of the casing due to over-enthusiastic tightening. Later units make use of a flat plug with a small Torx head making it harder to apply excessive torque to the plug.
- Retrofitting the five speed unit (BC5) into a Fiesta Mk1 is not straightforward as it requires modifications to the chassis to allow clearance for the gearbox to fit - the Mk2 Fiesta in contrast had widened chassis rails in order to cope with the increased length of both the BC5 transmission and the CVH engine, since the Mk1 was originally designed to only use the Valencia/BC4 combination. The crossmember mounting points also require modifications.

== iB5 Version ==
A completely revised version of the transaxle was introduced in 1995 and was designated iB5, and was initially introduced for the Mk.4 Fiesta. The major difference being an improved cable-operated shift mechanism and the introduction of a hydraulically operated clutch. The ultimate version is IB5+, manufactured only in Brazil, that fits engines as big as 2.0 litre.

== Applications ==
- Ford Fiesta (BC series: 1976–1995; iB5: 1995–present)
- Ford Escort (BC series: 1980–1995; iB5: 1995–2002)
- Ford Ka (1996–2008)
- Ford Puma (1997–2001)
- Ford Focus: 1.4L, 1.6L & 1.8L (Uses iB5; 1998–present)
- Ford Focus: 2.0L CVH/SPI (Uses iB5; 2000–2004)
- Ford EcoSport: (2003–present)
- Ford Fusion (Europe)
- Mazda Demio / Mazda 2 DY with Ford Sigma engines
