= Ford Zetec engine =

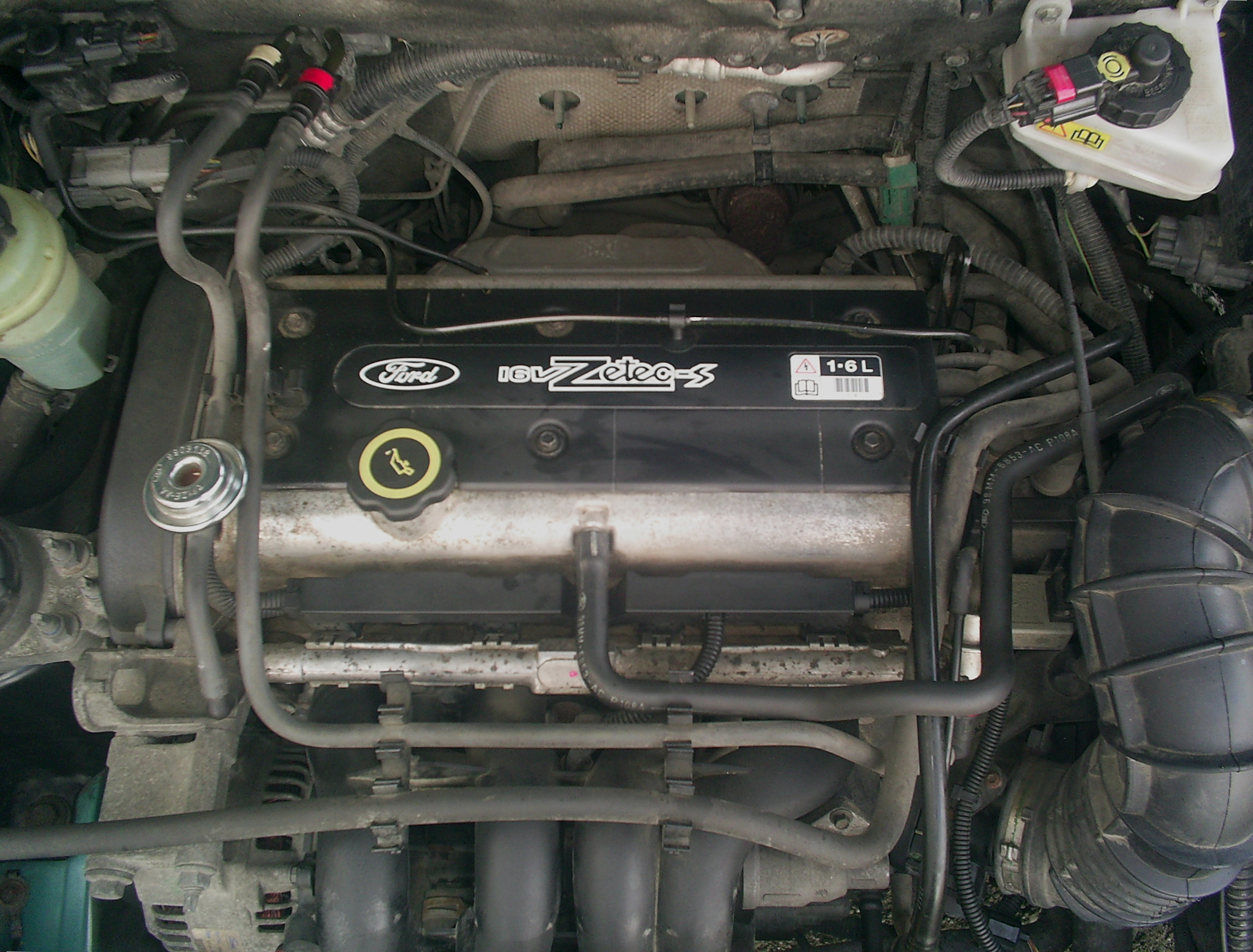

Overview
- Manufacturer: Ford Motor Company
- Production: 1991–present

Layout
- Configuration: I4
- Displacement: 1.0–2.0 L (999–1,988 cc)
- Cylinder block material: cast iron/aluminium 2012
- Cylinder head material: aluminium
- Valvetrain: DOHC 4 valves x cyl. SOHC 2 valves x cyl.

Combustion
- Supercharger: On 1.0 L Brazilian version
- Turbocharger: On Focus RS
- Fuel system: Fuel injection
- Fuel type: Petrol
- Cooling system: Water-cooled

Output
- Power output: 65–215 PS (48–158 kW)

Dimensions
- Dry weight: 100 kg (220 lb) (2.0 L crate Zetec-R)

Chronology
- Predecessor: Ford Kent engine Ford CVH engine Ford Pinto engine
- Successor: Ford Duratec engine

Ford Motor Company used the Zetec name on a variety of inline four-cylinder automobile engines. It was coined to replace "Zeta" on a range of 1.6 L to 2.0 L multi-valve engines introduced in 1991 because Ford was threatened with legal action by Lancia who owned the Zeta trademark. The company used the name widely in European advertising and later introduced it to the North American market with the Contour.

The Zetec name was so widely recognized that Ford decided to apply it to other high-tech four-cylinder engines. It was used across many engine types in Europe even though the original Zeta design ended production in 2004. Ford also used the "Zetec" name for a trim level designation in certain markets.

A Formula One engine was produced for Ford by Cosworth in 1993. The 3.5-litre Zetec R V8 was used by the Benetton team in 1994, and powered Michael Schumacher to his first World Championship title.

== Engine reference ==
The Zetec name has been used on many different engines:

Name	Family	Displacements	Year	Features
Zetec/Zetec-E	Zeta	1.6 L (1,597 cc); 1.8 L (1,796 cc); 2.0 L (1,988 cc)	1992–2004	DOHC
Zetec-R	Zeta	1.8 L (1,796 cc); 2.0 L (1,988 cc)	1998–2004	DOHC
Zetec-SE	Sigma	1.2 L (1,242 cc); 1.4 L (1,388 cc); 1.6 L (1,596 cc); 1.7 L (1,679 cc)	1995–present	DOHC
Zetec-Rocam	Sigma	1.0 L (999 cc); 1.3 L (1,297 cc); 1.6 L (1,597 cc)	2000–2014	SOHC

== Zeta ==
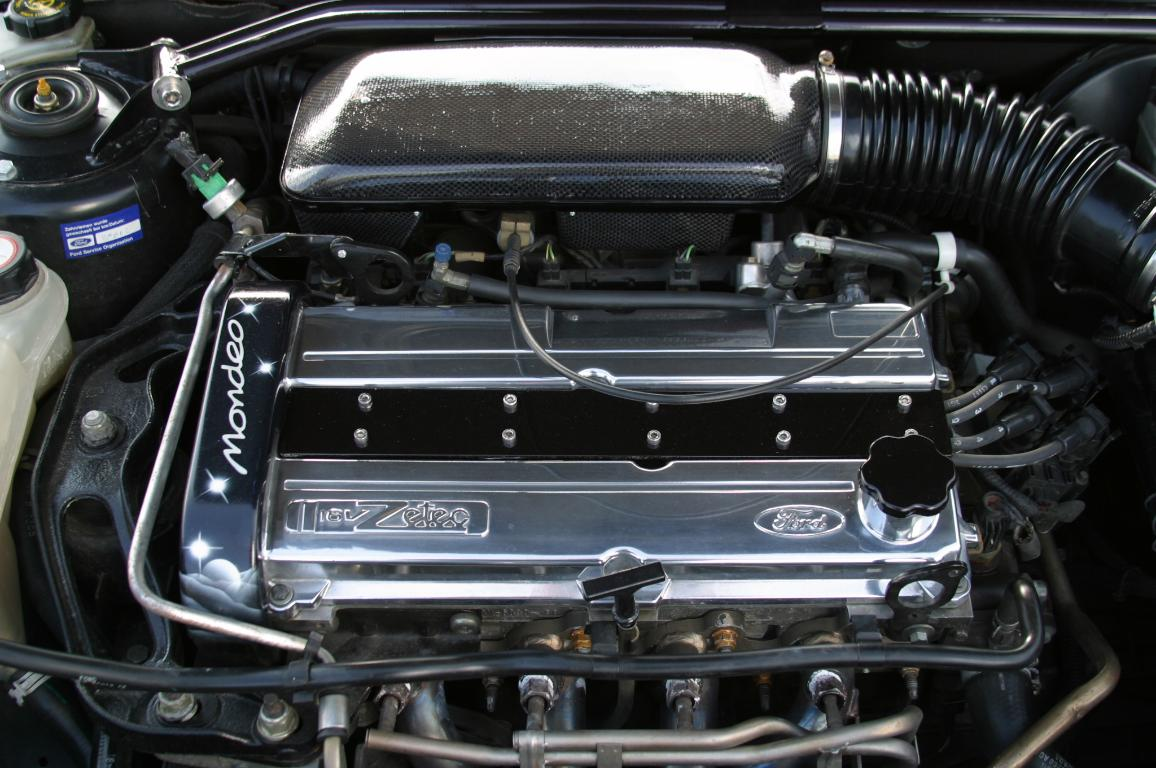
1.8-litre Zetec-E engine

The first Zetec-branded engine was the Zeta family, introduced for the 1992 model year powering the fifth generation of the European Ford Escort, the third generation Orion and the Mk.3 Fiesta. The engine was originally available in 1.6 and 1.8 liter versions with a 2.0 liter version appearing in 1993 in the all-new Mondeo. The "Zeta" name was dropped in favour of "Zetec" when Italian car maker Lancia threatened to sue Ford for trademark infringement. The codename "Zeta" was originally used for the design of the cylinder head. A number of different systems were evaluated, and each one had a different codename using the Greek alphabet. The Zeta concept was the winner and the 4-valve-per-cylinder, DOHC design was used for the head of the replacement for the CVH in Europe and the US.

The original manufacturing plan involved replacing the Dearborn manufactured CVH with Zeta. This resulted in the need to retain much of the architecture of the US CVH block. However, later in the development process, the plan was changed and the Chihuahua engine plant in Mexico was rebuilt to allow manufacture of the US engines. For Europe the decision was taken to build Zetas in Bridgend (Replacing CVH) and in Cologne. The US (2.0L) and European base engines were almost identical. However, crucially, the US management insisted that the US market engines had to have a non-interference design, so that in the event of a timing belt failure the valves wouldn't collide with the pistons. As such the US market engines used different pistons and featured sinter forged connecting rods (conventional cast rods were used in Europe). The non-interference design reduced fuel economy by around 1–2%, which was considered too great a penalty for the European market.

Early versions of the engine had a problem with sticking valves — far more evident in the UK (and in cold climates), where a driving style with earlier gear changes is more common than on the Continent — unless a special Ford formulation of oil was used. After small changes in 1995 to fix this problem the engine was known as the Zetec-E. This engine received a plastic inlet manifold and EGR derived from the Mondeo.

The Zetec had another redesign in 1998. This version, the Zetec-R, had a two-piece crankcase which helped damp out noise and vibration, conventional tappets with shims rather than hydraulic ones, and longer connecting rods with a lower piston compression height. This engine was used in turbocharged form in the Focus RS and had 212 bhp (158 kW; 215 PS) (dubbed Duratec RS). It was also used in the Focus ST170 with a cylinder head modified by Cosworth with Variable Valve Timing on the inlet cam and had 170 bhp (127 kW; 172 PS).

The Zetec can be identified by its silver cam cover with "DOHC 16v" on the bottom left. The Zetec-E has "ZETEC 16v" on the bottom left, and the Zetec-R has a black plastic cam cover. The Focus RS and ST170 (SVT) are both Zetec-R engines, despite being branded Duratec.

Production of the Zeta family lasted from September 1991 through December 2004. Displacement ranged from 1.6 L to 2.0 L. It was replaced in most applications by the Mazda MZR-based Duratec 20, though some Zetec-SE engines were used as replacements on the lower end. Ford Power Products sells the Zeta in 1.8 L and 2.0 L versions as the MVH.

The 2.0 L Zetec engine has seen some issues. Although the block and cylinder head are thermally stable, the coolant outlet housing for the thermostat is not. The housing used in the 2000–2004 model year US Ford Focus and 2001–2004 model year Ford Escape with 16-Valve DOHC engine is made from ABS plastic. It is bolted to the surface of the cylinder head on the right side of the engine with three bolts. The mating surface seals to the cylinder head with a rubber O-ring style gasket. The O-ring is held in place by a lip on the housing which is prone to cracking. The immediate inner portion of the housing will exhibit pitting and bubbling. Over time, pieces of the lip will break off, releasing plastic fragments into the cooling system. These fragments have not been known to cause any severe damage to the cooling system but the damaged lip on the housing will cause the O-ring seal to rupture. This allows coolant to leak out onto the upper transmission bell housing. The failure can result in severe loss of coolant.

In 2010, a Focus SVT owner in Minnesota identified a fix for the housing issue. It involves the use of a more durable housing made for an earlier model of Zetecs. The lighter housing (still specified by Ford Parts) has not been corrected for the design flaw. It has a short service life and is the cause of repeated failures. As of September 2013, Ford sells both versions of the housing. The better version lists for $20 more (USA) and has barbed hose fittings, as opposed to the smooth fittings of the problematic fitting. Fixes have been identified for the housing used by the Focus SVT as well as for the simpler housing used by ordinary Foci.

The 2.0 L version in the North American Ford Contour/Mercury Mystique was a closely related replacement for the previous CVH engine used in the Ford Escort.

== Sigma ==
The advanced Zetec-SE (sometimes badged as Zetec-S) was developed in collaboration with Yamaha and Mazda, under the Sigma codename. It ranges in size from 1.2 to 1.7 L (1,242 to 1,679 cc). It is very different from the Zeta engine — the intake and exhaust are even on opposite sides.

This engine is sold under the Sigma name in some regions, while Mazda uses the MZI name. It is also sold as a crate engine by Ford Power Products as the ZSG.

From 2002 on, Ford started to badge their engines as Duratec. The 1.7 L version was dropped when the production of the Puma ended. Now the 1.6 L is also available with variable valve timing, known by Ford as Ti-VCT (Twin Independent Variable Camshaft Timing).

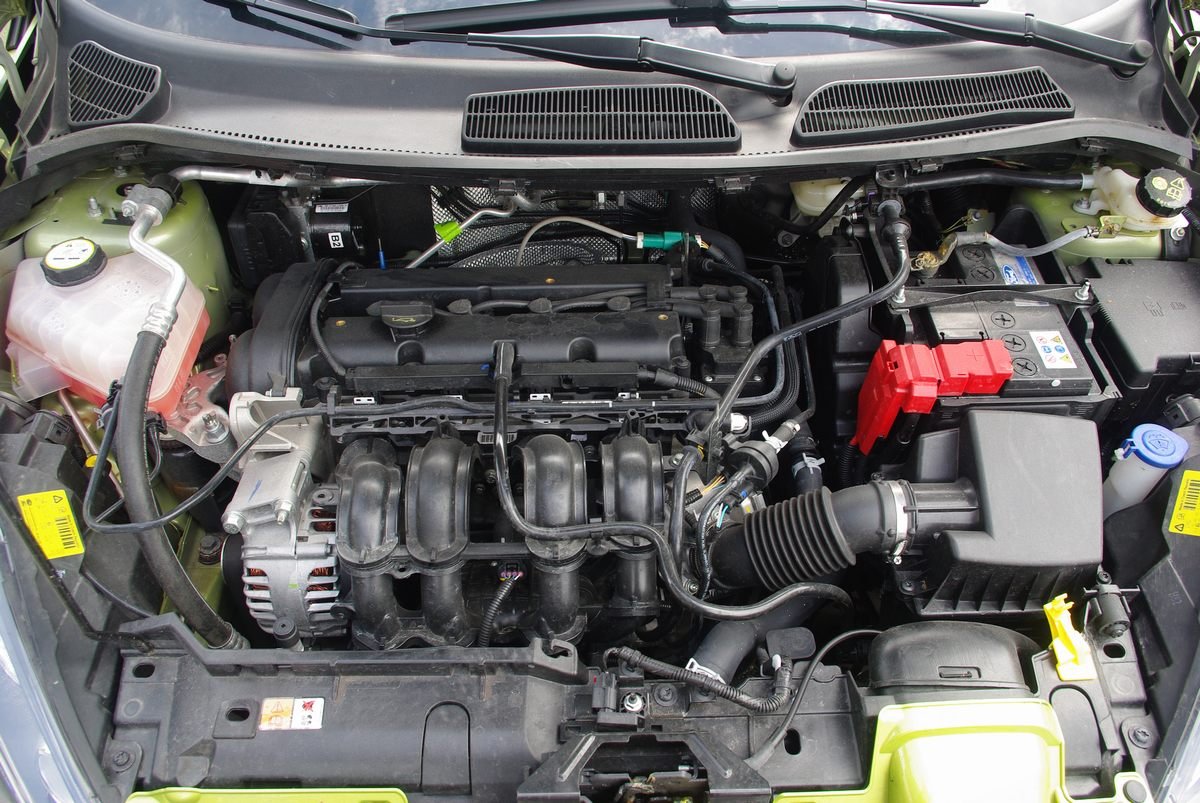
1.25-litre Duratec engine in a 2009 Ford Fiesta

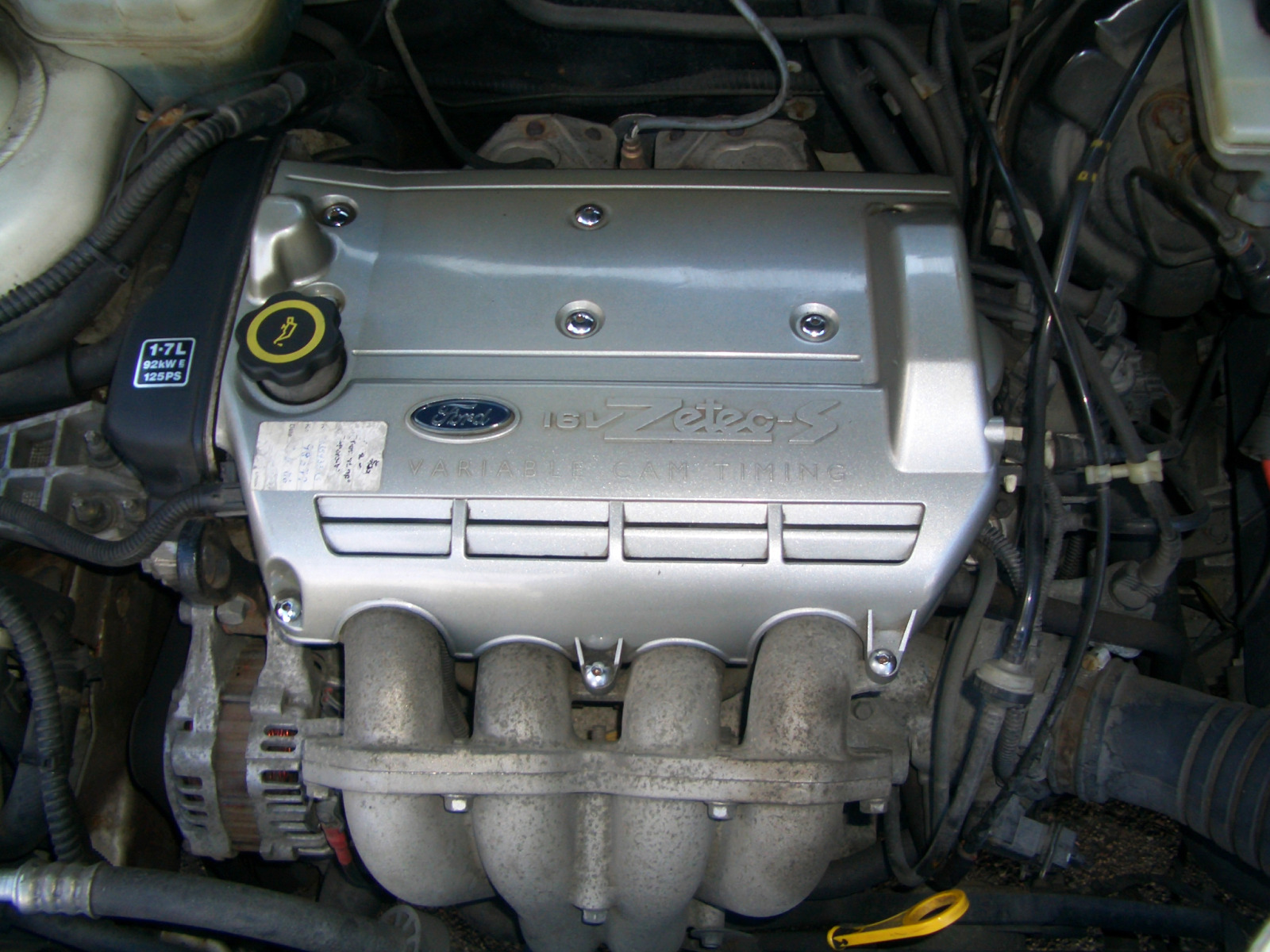
1.7-litre Zetec-S engine in a Ford Puma

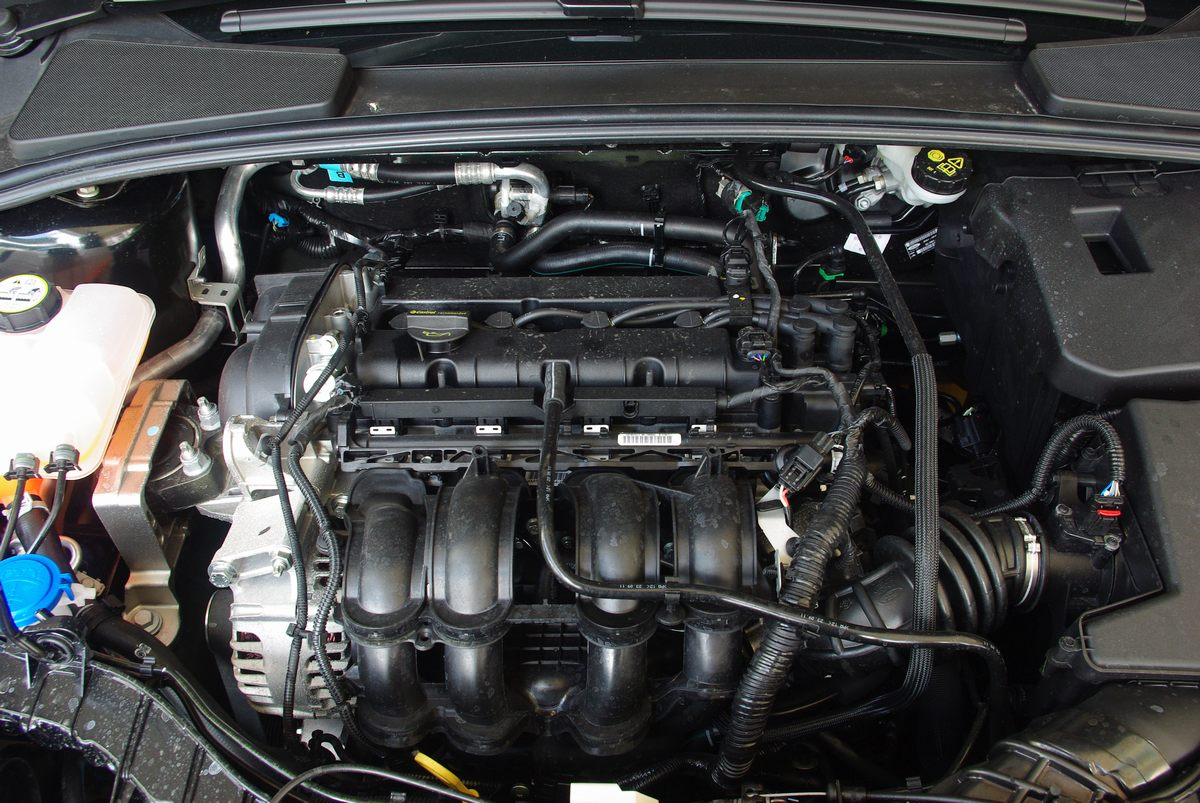
1.6-litre Duratec engine with TI-VCT in a 2012 Ford Focus

== Zetec Rocam (Duratec 8v) ==
In 2000, Ford of Brazil developed a cheaper version of the Zetec-S engine with single cam and 8 valves driven by a chain. As a result, this engine exhibits rougher behaviour, producing more vibration and noise. On the other hand, it has a superb torque output thanks to the addition of the Rocam (roller finger camshaft) feature.

In 2003, the Zetec-Rocam engine was introduced in Europe, but labeled as Duratec 8v, for the SportKa and StreetKa models. Later a 1.3 L version was also released as an option for the standard model, but the European versions of the engine are produced in the South Africa plant.

In October 2004 a newer bi-fuel version was introduced labeled "1.6 L Flex", capable of running on both petrol and ethanol, even mixed at any proportion. This version also featured "Compound High Turbulence" chambers, as used on the CHT engine.

Versions of this engine in Brazil: 1.0 L 65 PS (48 kW), 1.0 L supercharged 95 PS (70 kW), 1.6 L 96 PS (71 kW), 1.6 L flexfuel 105 PS (77 kW). It was used in many models, including Ka, Fiesta MK V, South American Fiesta Mk VI, Focus, EcoSport, Ford Courier.

Versions of this engine in Europe: 1.3 L 70 PS (51 kW), 1.6 L 95 PS (70 kW)

In Mexico the 1.6 L is used in the Ikon, named Fiesta for this market. In South Africa the 1.3 L and 1.6 L versions are/were used in Fiesta Mk V, Ikon, Bantam. In India the 1.3 L and 1.6 L versions are/were used in the Ikon. In Russia, the 1.6 L version was used in the original Ford Focus.

== Duratec ==
The Zetec was superseded by the Duratec series of engines, originally called RoFlow Zetec. These are virtually identical variants of the Mazda MZR engines.

== Zetec name as a trim level ==
In 1998, Ford of Britain applied the Zetec name to a trim level in the Fiesta range, replacing the Si. Petrol variants of the Fiesta LX were also renamed "Zetec LX," although this ceased within months.

Since then, the Zetec name has become a key staple of the Ford trim level hierarchy, serving as the sports-styled variant in most ranges. In October 1998, the newly launched Focus also used the name; and the Mondeo and Galaxy ranges also adopted the name before the decade was out.

Ford's "niche" models, such as the Ka and Fusion did not initially adopt the name, although even these models now include Zetec-badged variants.

Eventually, the Zetec name was used exclusively as a trim level, with no engines using the name. Zetec models are often seen as the staple of Ford's ranges, with Ford often creating "spin-offs" of Zetec models and running promotions on Zetec models in the range. Every passenger vehicle in the Ford of Britain range bar the Ford Focus Coupé-Cabriolet included a Zetec badged model; the same cannot be said of any other Ford trim level.

Such aforementioned spin-offs of the core Zetec model included the Zetec S (Fiesta, Focus and the 2000–2007 Mondeo), Zetec S 30th Anniversary Edition (2005–2008 Fiesta), Zetec S Celebration Edition (2005–2008 Fiesta), Zetec S Red (2005–2008 Fiesta), Zetec Nav (2000–2007 Mondeo), Zetec LX (1995–1999 Fiesta), Zetec Blue (Fiesta) and a key version, the Zetec Climate (1996–2009 Ka, 2002–2008 Fiesta, Fusion and the 2005–2008 Focus).

== See also ==
- Ford Duratec engine
- Ford Sigma engine
- Ford Zeta engine
- List of Ford engines
