= Ginetta G32 =

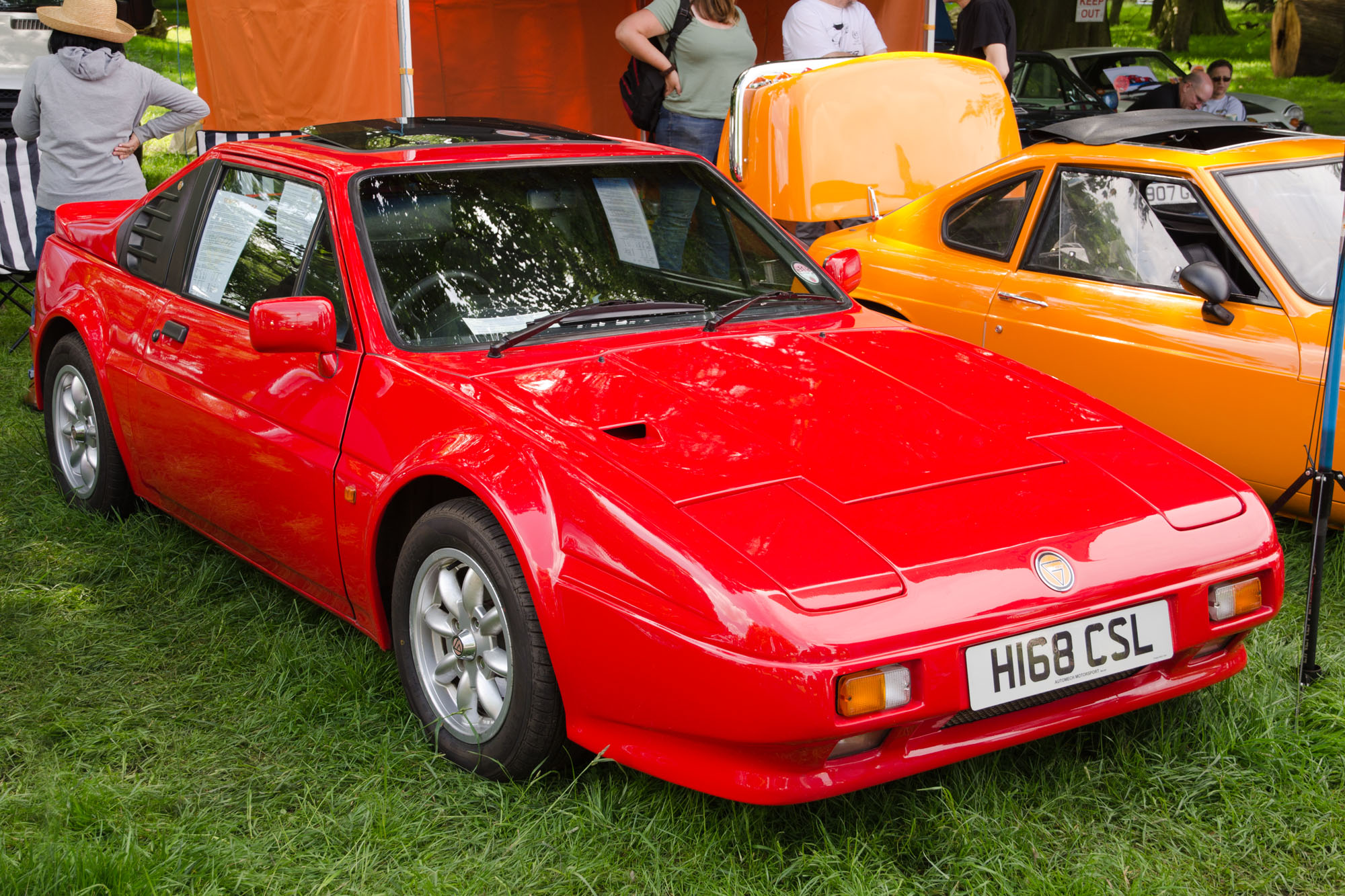

Overview
- Manufacturer: Ginetta Cars
- Production: 1989-1992 (115 produced)
- Assembly: Scunthorpe, UK
- Designer: Ivor Walklett

Body and chassis
- Body style: 2-door coupé 2-door convertible
- Layout: Rear mid-engine, rear-wheel-drive layout

Powertrain
- Engine: 1.6 L Ford CVH I4; 1.9 L Ford I4
- Transmission: 5-speed manual

Dimensions
- Wheelbase: 2,210 mm (87.0 in)
- Length: 3,760 mm (148.0 in)
- Width: 1,651 mm (65.0 in)
- Height: 1,168 mm (46.0 in)
- Kerb weight: 753 kg (1,660 lb)

The Ginetta G32 is a mid-engined sports car built by British car manufacturer Ginetta Cars from 1989 to 1992.

== Specification ==
The G32 is a two-seater mid-engined coupé and convertible, designed by Ivor Walklett. It is a compact car 3.76 m long and 1.65 m wide. A total of 115 examples were produced. The car incorporated many Ford parts including much of the interior and doors from the Ford Fiesta (with different, lower window frames). The front suspension is actually the rear suspension from the contemporary Ford Escort, turned through 180 degrees. The tie rods were used to set the toe angles of the rear wheels. The spaceframe chassis consists of square tubes, clad in a fibreglass bodyshell.

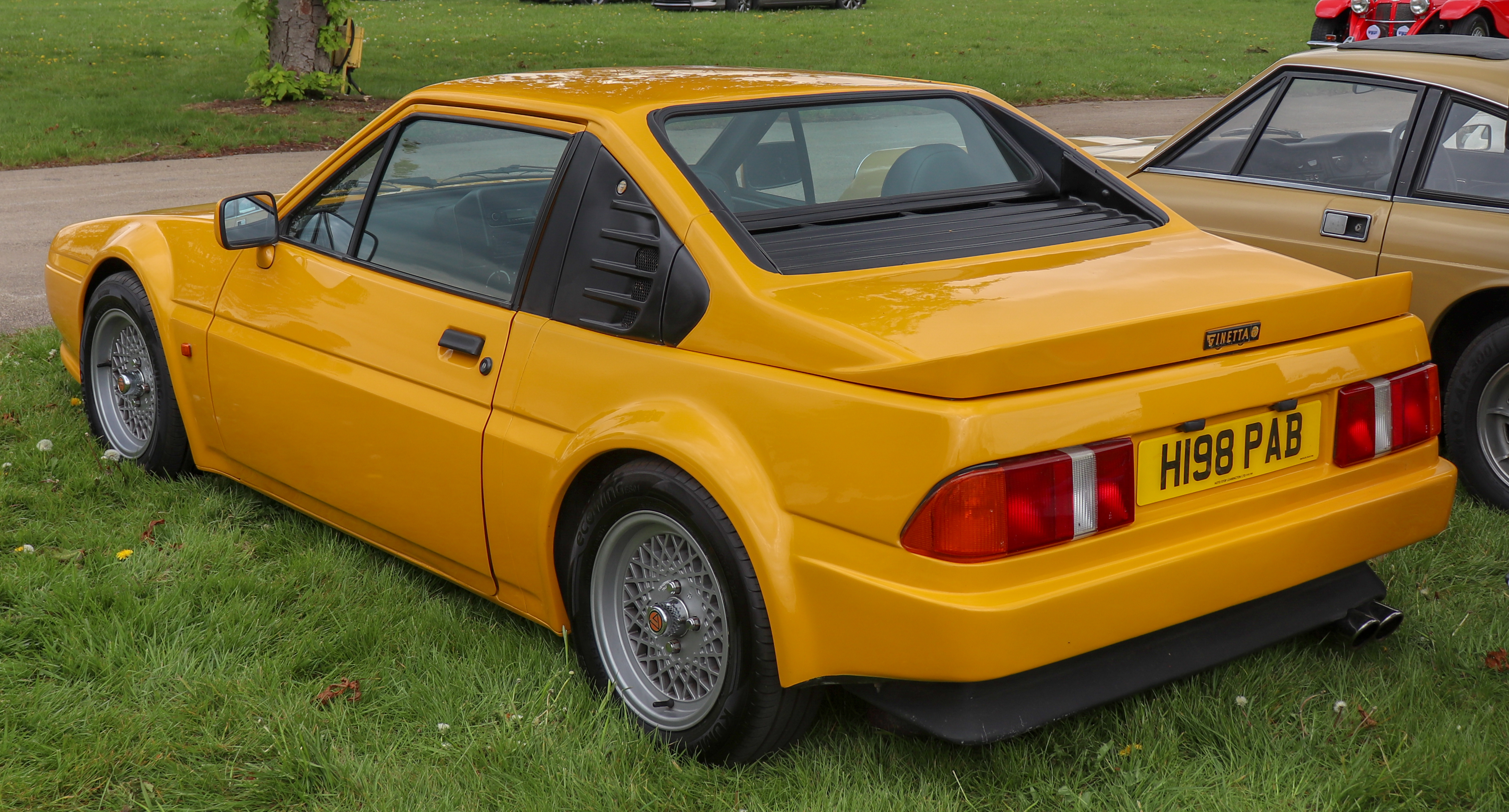
Rear view

The 1.6i is powered by a four-cylinder, 1597 cc Ford engine developing 110 PS (81 kW; 108 hp) at 6000 rpm and 141 N⋅m (104 lb⋅ft) of torque. Ginetta also offered a catalyzed version of this engine, producing 105 PS (77 kW; 104 hp). This was Ginetta's first car with a catalytic converter. The 1.9i model, powered by a 1905 cc derivative of the same Ford engine, develops 135 PS (99 kW; 133 hp) and 145 N⋅m (107 lb⋅ft) torque. Both versions are fitted with a 5-speed manual gearbox, borrowed from the Ford Escort as well.

A 1.6 turbo version was tested but was not put into production.
