= Ford CVH engine =

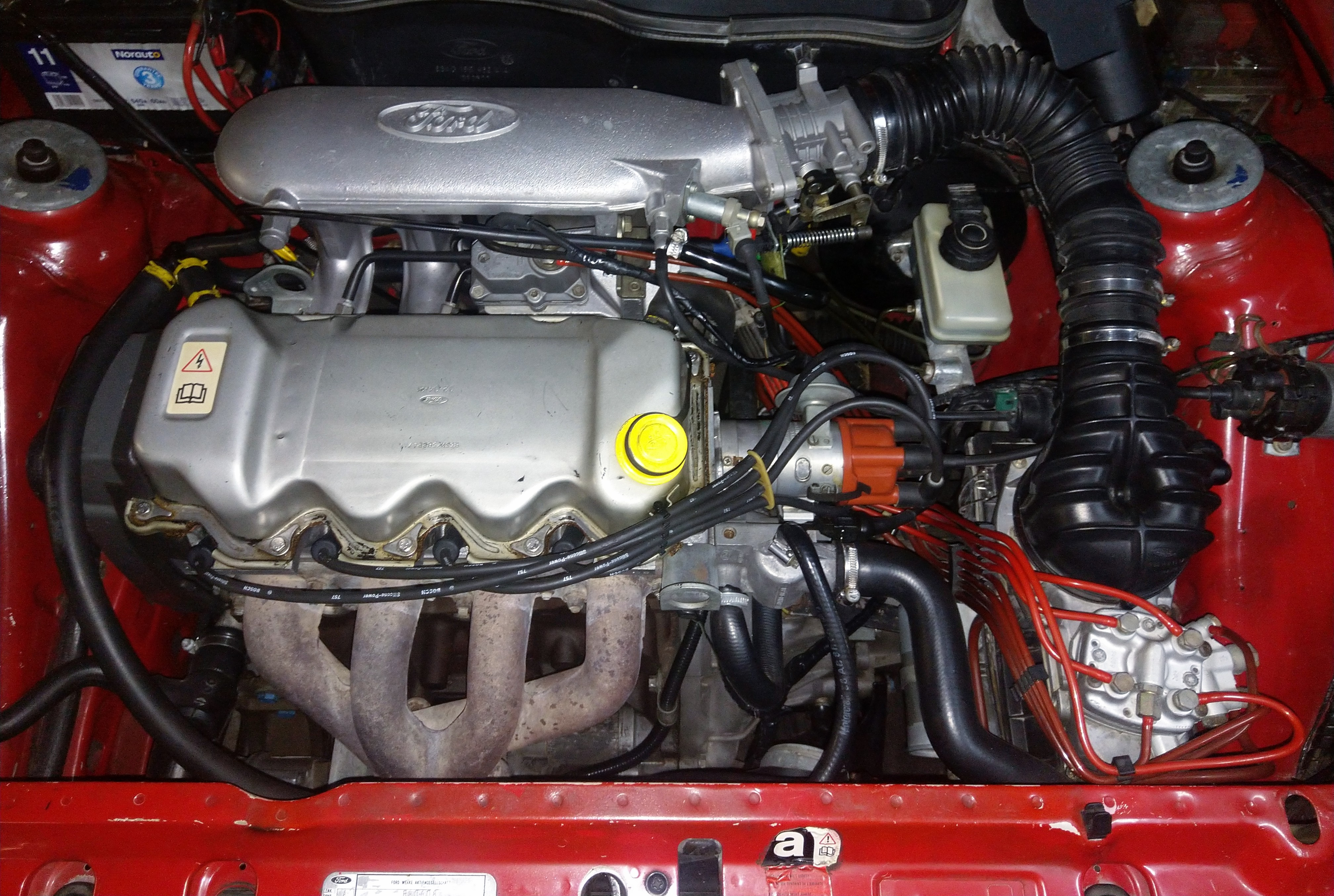
- 1.6 L Ford CVH engine in a 1988 Ford Escort XR3i

Overview
- Manufacturer: Ford Motor Company
- Production: 1980–2004

Layout
- Configuration: Inline-4
- Displacement: 1.1 L (1,117 cc; 68.2 cu in); 1.3 L (1,296 cc; 79.1 cu in); 1.4 L (1,392 cc; 84.9 cu in); 1.6 L (1,596 cc; 97.4 cu in); 1.8 L (1,769 cc; 108.0 cu in); 1.9 L (1,859 cc; 113.4 cu in); 2.0 L (1,988 cc; 121.3 cu in)
- Cylinder bore: 74 mm (2.91 in); 77.2 mm (3.04 in); 80 mm (3.15 in); 82 mm (3.23 in); 84.8 mm (3.34 in)
- Piston stroke: 64.5 mm (2.54 in); 65 mm (2.56 in); 74.3 mm (2.93 in); 79.5 mm (3.13 in); 88 mm (3.46 in)
- Cylinder block material: Cast iron
- Cylinder head material: Aluminum
- Valvetrain: Single cam-in-head, rocker arms, 2 valves per cylinder
- Compression ratio: 8.5:1–9.9:1 (Naturally aspirated); 8.3:1 (Turbocharged)

Combustion
- Turbocharger: Some 1.6 L versions
- Fuel system: Weber carburetor; Mechanical fuel injection; Electronic fuel injection; Single-point injection; Multi-point fuel injection
- Management: Ford EEC-IV; Bosch K-Jetronic or KE-Jetronic; ESC Hybrid
- Fuel type: Gasoline
- Oil system: Wet sump
- Cooling system: Water-cooled

Output
- Power output: 69–200 hp (51–149 kW)
- Torque output: 86–133 lb⋅ft (117–180 N⋅m)

Dimensions
- Dry weight: Circa 100 kg (220 lb)

Chronology
- Successor: Ford Zeta engine

The Ford CVH engine is a straight-four automobile engine produced by the Ford Motor Company. The engine's name is an acronym for either Compound Valve-angle Hemispherical or Canted Valve Hemispherical, where "Hemispherical" describes the shape of the combustion chamber. The CVH was introduced in 1980 in the third generation European Escort and in 1981 in the first generation North American Escort.

The CVH was produced in capacities from 1.1 to 2.0 L, with the smallest version offered exclusively in continental Europe, and the largest only in North America. Engines for North America were built in Ford's Dearborn Engine plant, while engines for Europe and the UK were built in Ford's then-new Bridgend Engine plant in Wales.

== History and Details ==
The engine was conceived of in 1974, and was a key part of Ford's "Erika" world car programme which produced both the third-generation European Escort and the 1981 North American car of the same name. Although the European and North American Escorts ended up being substantially different from each other in execution, the CVH engine was the one major common part shared between them. The CVH largely replaced the overhead valve Kent ("Crossflow") engine in Ford of Europe's portfolio, although the 'short block' Valencia version of the Kent remained in production for many decades (actually outliving the CVH by two years) - positioned below the CVH as an entry level engine in the smallest capacity Fiesta and Escort models.

The CVH is a cam-in-head design, with a single camshaft mounted low in the cylinder head operating two valves per cylinder via rocker arms. As indicated by the name, the valves in early examples are mounted at a compound angle in order to allow for a hemispherical combustion chamber, but without the need for dual camshafts (or an elaborate rocker system) which a "hemi" engine normally requires. The later "lean burn" versions of the engine launched in 1986 had reshaped combustion chambers to improve swirl, and were strictly speaking no longer hemi-headed at all. The CVH features hydraulic valve lifters, a first for a European Ford engine. In North America the engine was sold under different names, being called the "1.9L SEFI" from 1991 to 1996 in that market's Ford Escort, the "Split Port Induction 2000" or SPI2000 from 1997 to 2002, while from 2000 to 2004 it was simply the "Split Port" when offered in the Ford Focus.

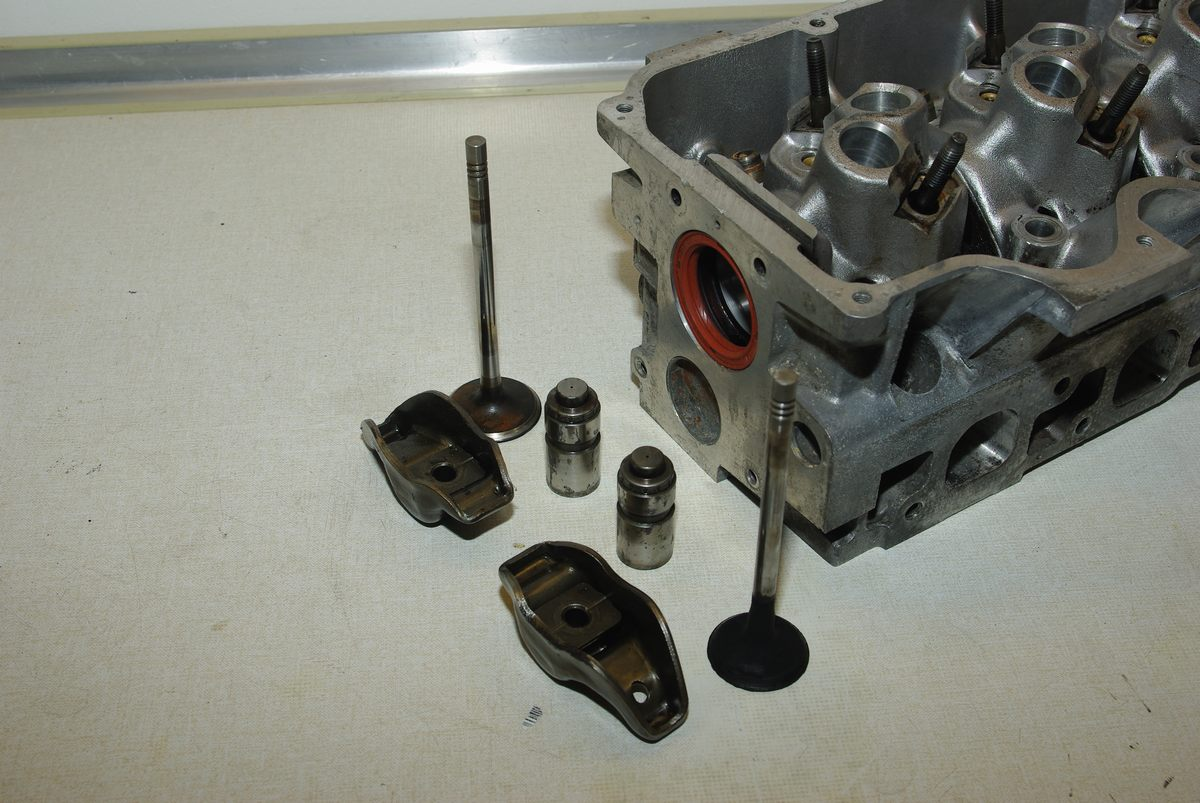
1.6 CVH cylinder head with valves, followers and rockers

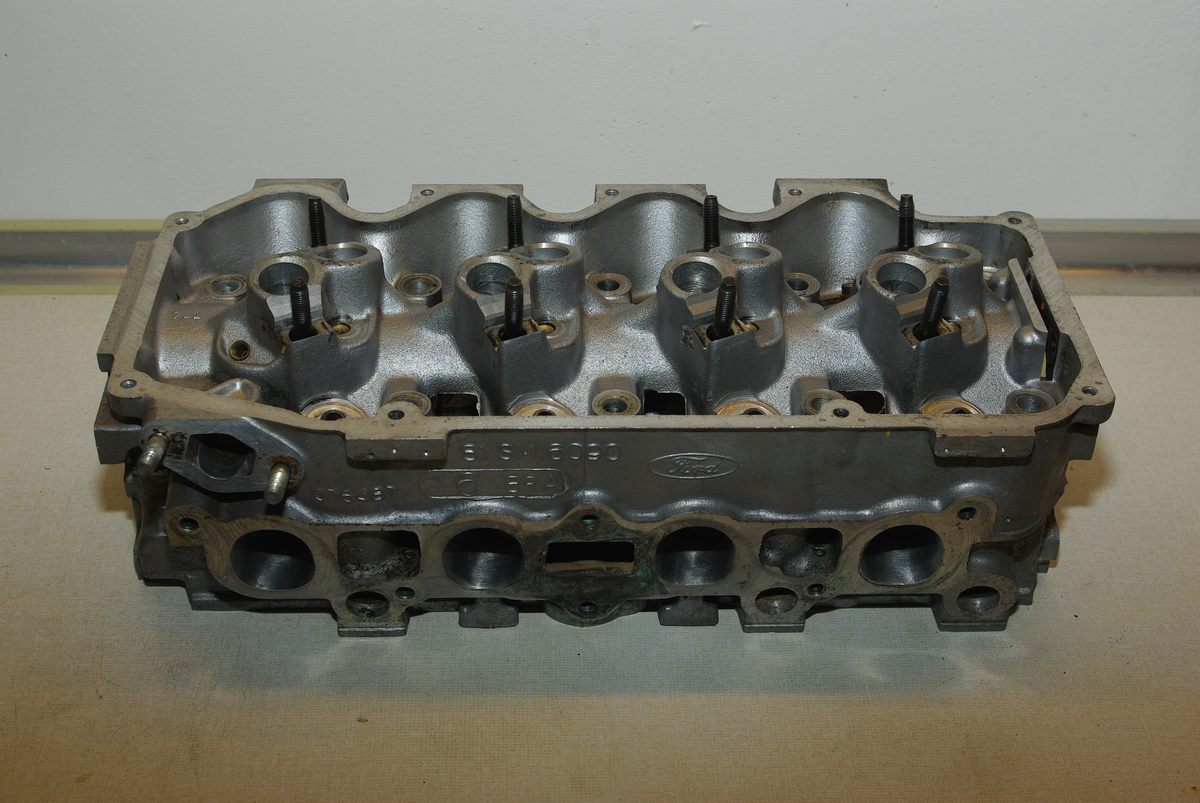
1.6 CVH cylinder head

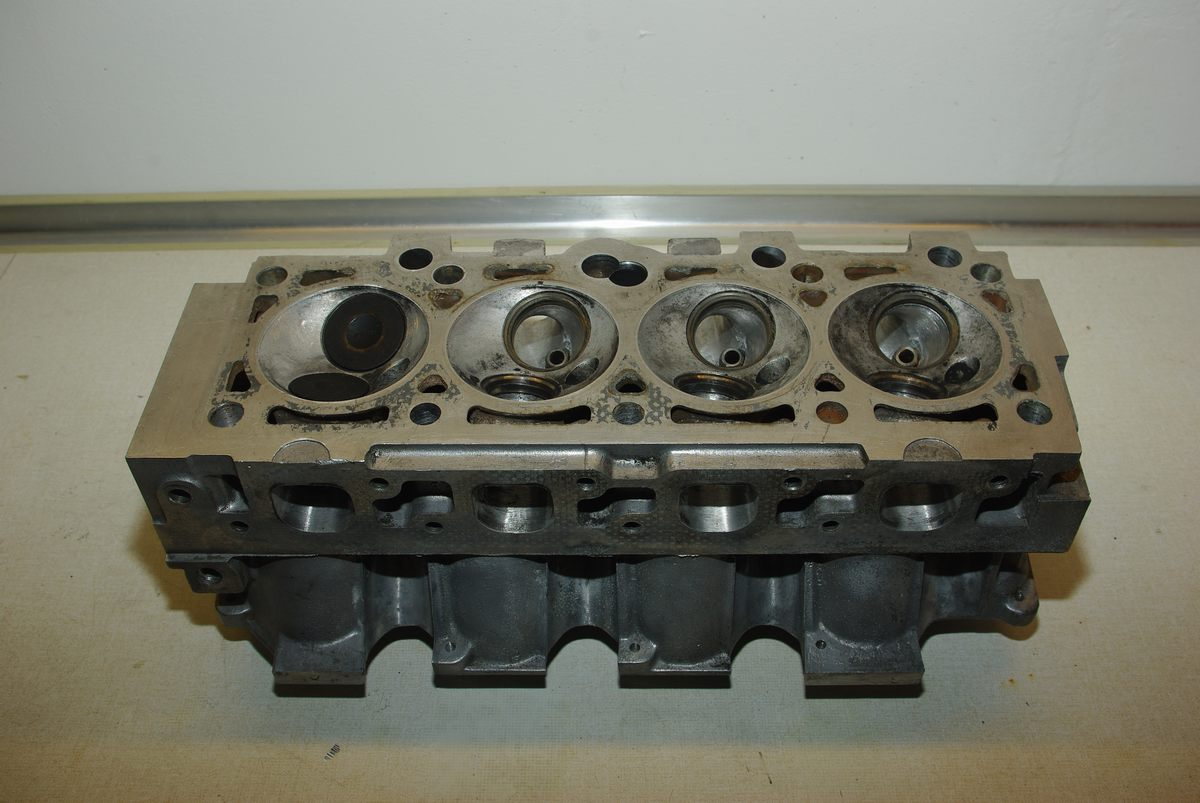
1.6 CVH cylinder head, combustion chambers

== 1.1 ==
The 1.1 L CVH had the shortest production life of the different variants. Bore × stroke are 74 mm × 65 mm (2.9 in × 2.6 in), and displacement is 1,117 cc (68.2 cu in). It debuted in the 1980 Escort MkIII for Continental Europe only, where it was offered as an alternative to the 1.1 L Valencia overhead valve (OHV) engine, which was the only 1.1 L engine offered in UK market Escorts. The 1.1 L CVH offered negligible improvements in economy or performance over the older Valencia unit, which was simpler and cheaper to manufacture, and hence was dropped in 1982.

Applications

- 1980–1981 Ford Escort Mk 3 (Continental Europe only)

== 1.3 ==
The 1.3 L CVH was introduced in the 1980 European Escort and used in the Orion and Fiesta from 1983 to 1986. Bore and stroke are 80 mm × 64.5 mm (3.15 in × 2.54 in), for a displacement of 1,296 cc (79.1 cu in). The 1.3 L was to be offered in the North American Escort, but testing found it to be unacceptably underpowered while Ford was unable to make it meet emissions requirements. US production plans were scrapped just months before full-scale production was scheduled to start.

For the facelifted fourth generation European Escort of 1986, this CVH was replaced by a 1.3 L Valencia engine in entry-level models, while higher trim level models used the 1.4 L CVH described below.

Applications

- 1980–1986 Ford Escort Mk 3
- 1983–1985 Ford Fiesta Mk 2
- 1983–1986 Ford Orion Mk 1

== 1.4 ==
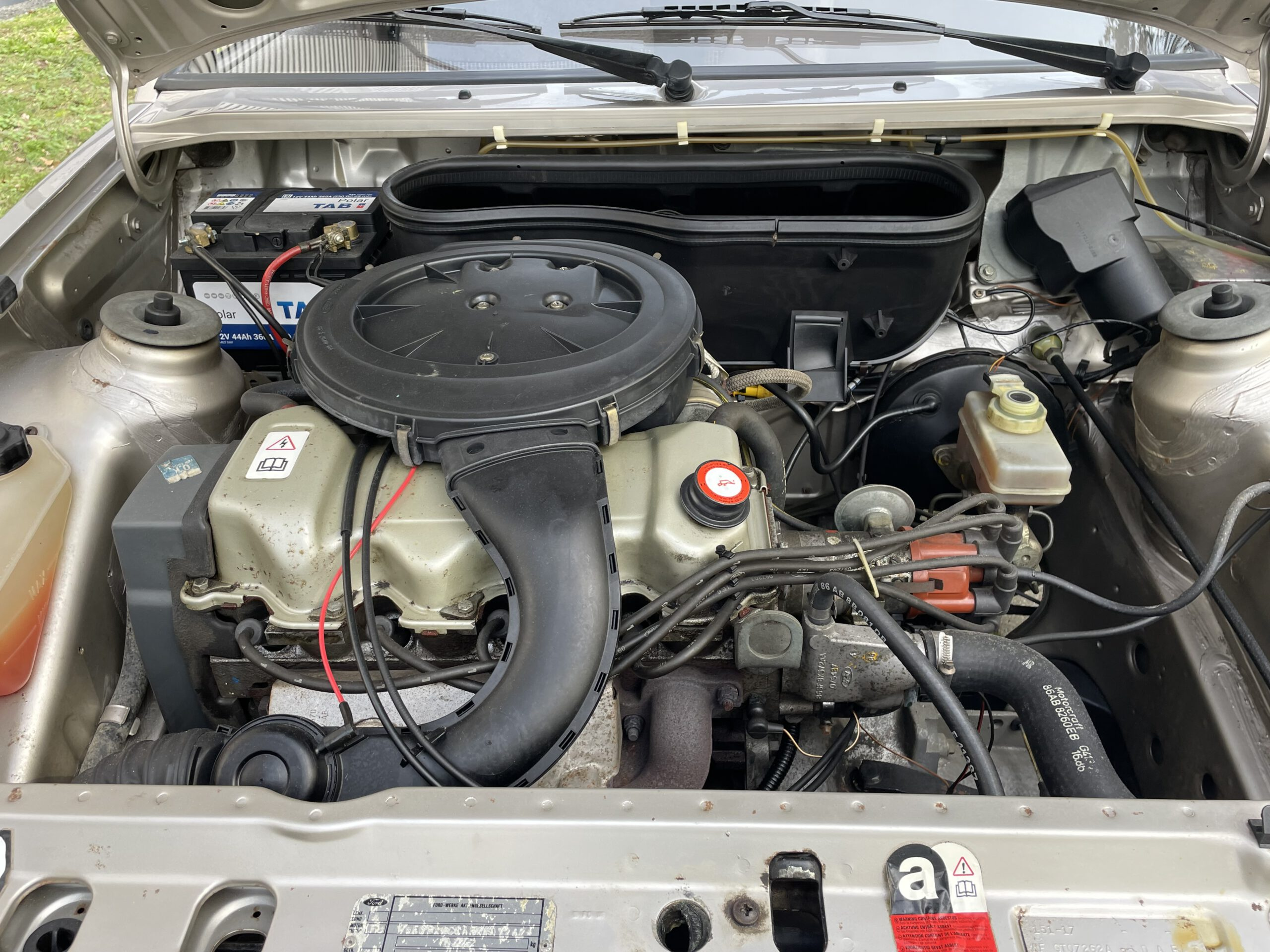
1.4-litre CVH engine in an Orion

The 1.4 L CVH replaced the 1.3 L CVH in the Escort, Orion and Fiesta from early 1986. Bore and stroke are 77.2 mm × 74.3 mm (3.04 in × 2.93 in), and displacement is 1,392 cc (84.9 cu in). In European trim, this engine produced 75 hp (55 kW).

Known as the 'Lean Burn' engine, it was designed primarily for fuel economy and featured a different cylinder head than other CVH engines. The Ford variable venturi carburetor was replaced by a Weber 28/30 TLDM which used a manifold vacuum-actuated secondary choke instead of the more usual sequential linkage which opens the secondary butterfly at 3/4 to full throttle. The 1.4 L version is less responsive to power modification than other CVH engines, and some common tuning parts cannot be used.

In South Africa, the 1.4 L CVH was fitted to the Ford Laser and Meteor, which were rebadged Mazda Familias. It replaced the 1.3 L Mazda E engine used in these cars and was itself replaced by the 1.3 L Mazda B engine.

Applications

- 1986–1990 Ford Escort Mk 4
- 1990–2000 Ford Escort Mk 5
- 1986–1989 Ford Fiesta Mk 2
- 1989–1995 Ford Fiesta Mk 3
- 1986–1990 Ford Orion Mk 2
- 1990–1992 Ford Orion Mk 3

=== CVH-PTE ===
The CVH-PTE is a revised version of the 1.4 L CVH introduced on the European Ford Fiesta 1.4 Si and Ford Escort in 1994. It features multi-point injection and a thicker crankcase to reduce harshness at high revs. Through the 1990s it was gradually phased out in favour of the newer Zetec 16-valve unit.

== 1.6 ==
The naturally aspirated (NA) 1.6 L CVH debuted in the 1980 European Escort and the 1981 North American Escort. Bore and stroke are 80 mm × 79.5 mm (3.15 in × 3.13 in) and total displacement is 1,597 cc (97.5 cu in).

=== European NA 1.6 ===
European versions produced 79 hp (58 kW) with the Ford variable venturi carburetor, 96 hp (71 kW) with the twin venturi 32/34 DFT Weber carburetor used in the Fiesta XR2 and the Escort XR3, 105 hp (77 kW) with Bosch K-Jetronic injection, 90 hp (66 kW) with KE-Jetronic mechanical fuel injection, and 108 hp (79 kW) with electronic fuel injection (EFI) and a Ford EEC-IV engine control unit (ECU) as found in the XR3i or Orion GLSI. A 115 hp (85 kW) version was offered in the Escort RS1600i, developed by Ford Motorsport Germany for FIA Group A homologation. This version featured a reworked cylinder head, solid cam followers and bronze bearings, and a host of other motorsport features.

European versions of the carbureted 1.6 L engine from the 1986 model year on were revised and, like the new 1.4 L, benefit from cylinder heads with a heart-shaped lean-burn combustion chambers and a slightly raised piston crown. The carburetor is a Weber twin venturi 28/32 TLDM unit. Power output is improved to 90 PS (66 kW; 89 hp) with the benefit of improved torque and fuel economy. EFI versions used in the Escort XR3i, 1.6i and Fiesta XR2i retained hemispherical combustion chambers. From the 1989 model year all EFI variants are fitted with the Ford EEC-IV ECU.

Applications

- 1980–1986 Ford Escort Mk 3
- 1986–1990 Ford Escort Mk 4
- 1983–1989 Ford Fiesta Mk 2
- 1989–1992 Ford Fiesta Mk 3 (Replaced by Zetec from 1993 model year onward)
- 1988–1993 Ford Sierra
- 1983–1986 Ford Orion Mk 1
- 1986–1990 Ford Orion Mk 2
- 1990–1992 Ford Orion Mk 3
- 1990–1991 Ford Escort Mk 5 (Replaced by Zetec in 1992)

=== Chinese NA 1.6 ===
Chery manufactured a 1.6 L CVH for use in their SEAT Toledo based vehicles. Chery purchased the production line for this engine in England, which was then transferred to Anhui. The first engines left the production line in May 1999. The engine is codenamed SQR480. Chery replaced the CVH with their own ACTECO engines.

Applications:

- 1999–2006 Chery Fulwin

=== North American NA 1.6 ===
Standard 1.6 L output started at 65 hp (48 kW) and 85 lb⋅ft (115 N⋅m). The early North American engines are built with cast pistons and connecting rods, a low-flow version of the CVH head, flat hydraulic lifters, a 0.229" lift camshaft, 32/32 Weber-licensed carburetor, cast exhaust manifold, and low-dome pistons. Over the years compression ratios ranged from 8.5:1–9.0:1, while power started at 65 hp (48 kW) in 1981, rising to 74 hp (55 kW) by 1985.

A 1.6 L High Output (HO) motor became available in late 1982 through 1985. Changes to it included a 4-2-1 header, higher-lift (0.240") camshaft, a 32/34 Weber carburetor, a dual-snorkel air-box, and high-dome pistons making 9.0:1–9.5:1 compression making 74 hp (55.2 kW) in 1982 and 80 hp (59.7 kW) in 1983–1985.

A 1.6 L EFI motor became an option in 1983 through 1985. It had all the features of the HO (Higher Output) motor but had a totally different intake system to allow for multi-point EFI running on Ford's EEC-IV ECU. The 1.6 EFI shares the same head as the carbureted 1.6 found in North America but without a mechanical fuel pump. The 1.6 EFI engine was replaced by the 1.6 HO in all high-altitude regions, making the 1.6 EFI a rare model.

Applications

- 1981–1984 Ford Escort
- 1981–1984 Mercury Lynx
- 1982–1983 Mercury LN7
- 1982–1985 Ford EXP

== 1.6 Turbo ==
=== European Turbo 1.6 ===
A turbocharged version of the 1.6 L was developed by Ford Europe for the RS Turbo Escort and the later Ford Fiesta RS Turbo. It makes 132 hp (97 kW) at 6,000 rpm, and 133 lb⋅ft (180 N⋅m) of torque at 3,000 rpm. The block is modified to provide an oil return from the turbocharger. Crankshaft and connecting rods are identical to the standard 1.6 L models, but the Mahle pistons are unique to the RS Turbo, and are manufactured using a pressure cast method which makes them considerably stronger and more expensive than the normal cast pistons. The compression ratio was reduced to 8.3:1, allowing the use of higher boost pressure. The engine only needs 7 psi (0.48 bar) of boost to produce its quoted power output.

Applications

- 1980–1986 Ford Escort Mk 3
- 1986–1990 Ford Escort Mk 4
- 1989–1995 Ford Fiesta Mk 3

=== North American Turbo 1.6 ===
The North American 1.6 turbocharged CVH was developed by Ford's Special Vehicle Operations (SVO) with help from Jack Roush for 1984 and 1985 in the Ford EXP Turbo, Ford Escort GT Turbo, and Mercury Lynx RS Turbo. At 120 hp (89 kW), its output is 50% higher than the carbureted North American 1.6 L HO, making it the most powerful production CVH offered in North America while returning impressive fuel efficiency and without reducing the engine's lifespan. The turbocharged engine featured a specially designed cam profile (0.240", comparable to the 1.6 HO and EFI camshafts), a Ford Performance/SVO modified head (comparable to European 1.6s), the EFI intake manifold, a unique cast exhaust manifold, low-dome pistons, and Ford's top-of-the-line EFI and ECU. These engines only appeared in the 1984–1985 Ford Escort GT Turbo and 1984–1985 Ford EXP Turbo, of which only about 10,000 were made in total. The 1.6 turbocharged Fords came standard with a TRX package that included upgraded suspension and specialty Michelin tires.

Applications

- 1984–1985 Ford Escort
- 1984–1985 Mercury Lynx
- 1984–1985 Ford EXP

== 1.8 ==
The 1.8 L CVH was only used in the European Ford Sierra. Bore is the same 80 mm (3.15 in) as the 1.6 L CVH, but a different crankshaft with a stroke of 88 mm (3.46 in) raises displacement to 1,769 cc (108.0 cu in). The cylinder head is equipped with hydraulic roller camshaft followers to reduce noise. Utilises an ESC Hybrid management system, and a Pierburg 2E3 carburettor or single point fuel injection on later models.

Applications

- 1989–1993 Ford Sierra (Replaced the Ford Pinto engine from 1989 model year onward)

== 1.9 ==
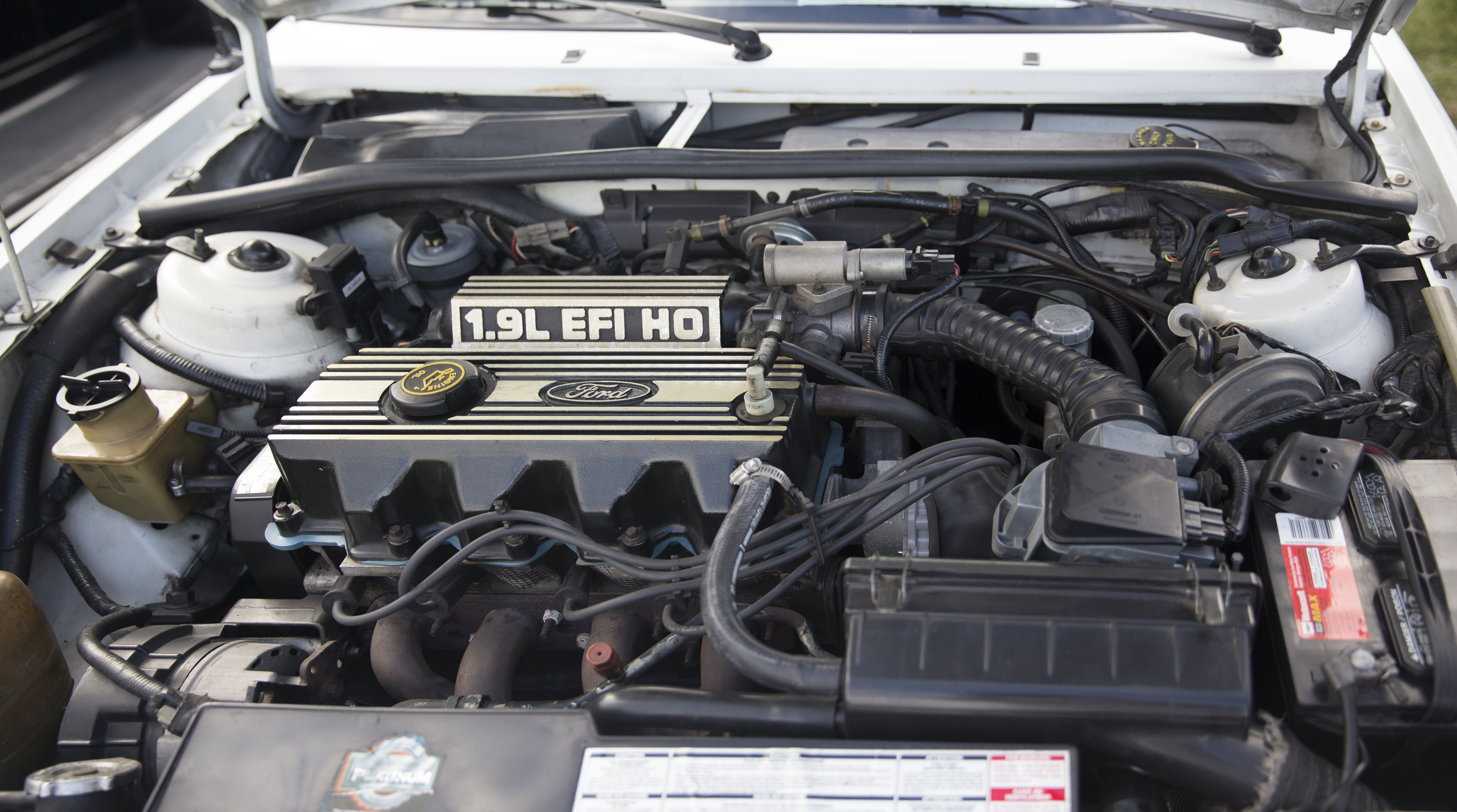
1.9 L "High Output" EFI engine in a 1990 Ford Escort GT

The CVH was enlarged to 1.9 L for the 1986 model year North American Escort. Bore and stroke are 82 mm × 88 mm (3.23 in × 3.46 in). This stroke length was later used in the 2.0 L CVH engine, and again in the Zeta engine which replaced it. The long stroke necessitated a raised engine block deck, a design also shared with later units. All 1.9s from 1989 on are equipped with a roller camshaft and roller lifters. The camshaft and water pump are driven by the timing belt. This engine is a non-interference design. Output is 86 hp (64 kW) and 100 lb⋅ft (136 N⋅m) with a carburetor. In models with electronic single-point fuel injection (or throttle-body injection, called Central Fuel Injection (CFI) by Ford), an additional 4 hp (3.0 kW) is produced, while torque is little changed.

Multi-point fuel injection and hemispherical combustion chambers are features of the 1986 Escort GT's EFI HO engine, raising output to 108 hp (81 kW) and 114 lb⋅ft (155 N⋅m).

The 90 hp (67 kW) 1.9 L CFI engine of the late 1980s, particularly when equipped with either the four- or five-speed manual transaxle, was noted for delivering outstanding fuel economy. The four-speed Escort Pony models achieved better mileage than five-speed cars, with upwards of 30 mpg_{‑US} (7.8 L/100 km; 36 mpg_{‑imp}) in city driving and 40–45 mpg_{‑US} (5.9–5.2 L/100 km; 48–54 mpg_{‑imp}) on the highway not being uncommon.

The second generation American Escort received sequential electronic fuel injection (SEFI) for 1991–1996 (sharing the same head as the 1.9 CFI), but power and torque are little changed at 88 hp (66 kW) and 108 lb⋅ft (146 N⋅m) respectively.

Applications

- 1986–1996 Ford Escort
- 1985–1987 Mercury Lynx
- 1991–1996 Mercury Tracer
- 1986–1988 Ford EXP
- Gen 2 Spec Racer Ford

== 2.0 ==
The 2.0 L was introduced in the 1997 North American Escort sedan and wagon as the SPI2000. Ford's Split Port Induction (SPI) system is a form of variable-length intake manifold. In this system, the intake path to each intake valve is split into primary and secondary passages. The primary passage contains the injector for the cylinder, and introduces the air tangentially to the cylinder for maximum swirl. The secondary passage contains an intake manifold runner control (IMRC) deactivation valve which opens for high speed and wide-open throttle (WOT) situations to provide a minimally restricted path for additional air to maximize volumetric efficiency and power. With SPI this engine produces 110 hp (82 kW) and 125 lb⋅ft (169 N⋅m). The additional displacement is achieved by boring the 1.9 L engine to 84.8 mm (3.34 in). As with the 1.9, the water pump is driven by the timing belt. Like the 1.9 L, this engine is a non-interference design. It is the last CVH engine made, and production ended with the 2004 Ford Focus LX/SE sedan and wagons. These engines have "2.0L Split Port" in raised letters on the top of the valve cover.

Applications

- 1997–2002 Ford Escort
- 1997–1999 Mercury Tracer
- 2000–2004 Ford Focus Mk1 (North America)

== Common problems ==
=== Noise, vibration, harshness ===
Throughout its 20-year production life, the CVH had a reputation for excessive noise, vibration, and harshness (NVH). Jeremy Clarkson said of the CVH-powered Escort that "it was powered by engines so rough, even Moulinex wouldn't use them". This harshness is mostly due to the cylinder head and valvetrain design. At 220 lb (100 kg) at full lift, the valve springs in the CVH are considerably stiffer than is typical in other engines. The stiff springs are needed to overcome the weight of the rocker arms and hydraulic self-adjusting tappets used and thereby prevent valve float, which they do up to around 6700 rpm. The stiff valve springs add more friction and pressure to the already high-friction "flat tappet" design.

=== Sludge ===
The camshaft is oiled by small holes in the cylinder head casting next to the lifter bores. These holes are prone to blocking up with oil sludge if the engine is not serviced regularly, starving the camshaft of oil. The CVH is known for producing excessive sludge if the service schedule is ignored or if poor quality oil is used. The cause is the design of the crankcase ventilation circuit, which Ford revised several times over the engine's lifetime but never completely cured. Due to this, camshaft and tappet wear problems are common. A worn camshaft can cause heavy clattering and ticking from the engine's top end, especially at high engine speeds.

=== Valve seat failure ===
A common problem with later CVHs is their tendency to drop a valve seat, which happens most often in VIN P engines. This can occur with no warning, even if the engine has been well maintained. In most cases, a seat drops on the number 4 cylinder, with the next most common being the number 2 cylinder. With the factory valve seats, the typical life of the 2.0 L SPI in a Focus is about 100,000 to 120,000 mi (160,000 to 190,000 km), but a failure can happen as early as 70,000 mi (110,000 km). When the valve seat drops out of the cylinder head, it falls into the cylinder and damages the cylinder wall, piston, and cylinder head. In some cases, the valve seat is drawn from its cylinder through the intake manifold into another cylinder, where it causes damage.

== Kits cars, limited production cars, tuners ==
Apart from Ford's own models, the CVH engine was used in a number of vehicles built by small volume manufacturers, and was offered as an option in some owner-assembled cars. Several companies also began supplying performance parts and complete engines for CVH owners in search of more power.

Small volume applications:

- 1982–1993 Morgan 4/4 — 1.6 L
- 1983–1989 Panther Kallista — 1.6 L
- 1984–1990 Reliant Scimitar SS1 — 1.3 L, 1.4 L, 1.6 L
- 1986–1991 Caterham CVH — 1.6L
- 1989–1992 Ginetta G32 — 1.6 L
- 1990–1992 Reliant Scimitar SST — 1.3 L, 1.4 L
- 1992–1993 Reliant Scimitar Sabre — 1.4 L

Kit car applications:

- Westfield Sportscars SE — 1.6 L
- Sylva Mojo and Mojo 2
- Stuart Taylor Mark 1.

Tuners:

- Burton Power.
- Specialised Engines.
- Ferriday Engineering.
- Norris Motorsport.

== Hybrid engines ==
=== Schrick 16V ===
In 1982 the German company Dr. Schrick GmbH, later renamed AVL Schrick, developed a double overhead camshaft (DOHC) multi-valve cylinder head for the 1.6 L CVH block. Each of the two overhead camshafts is installed in a separate camshaft carrier that is attached to the main body of the cylinder head. Each carrier has its own cam cover. Fitted with an original RS1600i engine intake manifold, a tubular exhaust manifold, and modified ignition, prototype engines developed 99 kW (133 hp).

In contrast to cylinder head conversions produced for Ford by Cosworth, the Schrick cylinder head never went into series production. With the introduction of the multi-valve Zetec engine, Schrick stopped development.

=== ZVH/ZE-VH ===
The ZVH or ZE-VH engine mounts a CVH 8 valve cylinder head on a Zeta/Zetec engine block. This is possible because the cylinder bore spacing, locations of the water and oil passages, and the cylinder head bolts on these engines are identical.

This combination of parts allowed the owner of a CVH-powered car to retain the cylinder head and associated parts from the original engine while substituting a stronger, large displacement engine block. Some builders have built ZVH engines that used the cylinder head, fuel injection system, ignition system, exhaust manifold, and turbocharger from the Escort RS combined with a Zetec block.

The engine's name indicates a Zetec/CVH hybrid.

== See also ==
- Ford CHT engine
- List of Ford engines
