= Ford LT engine =

Automobile engine

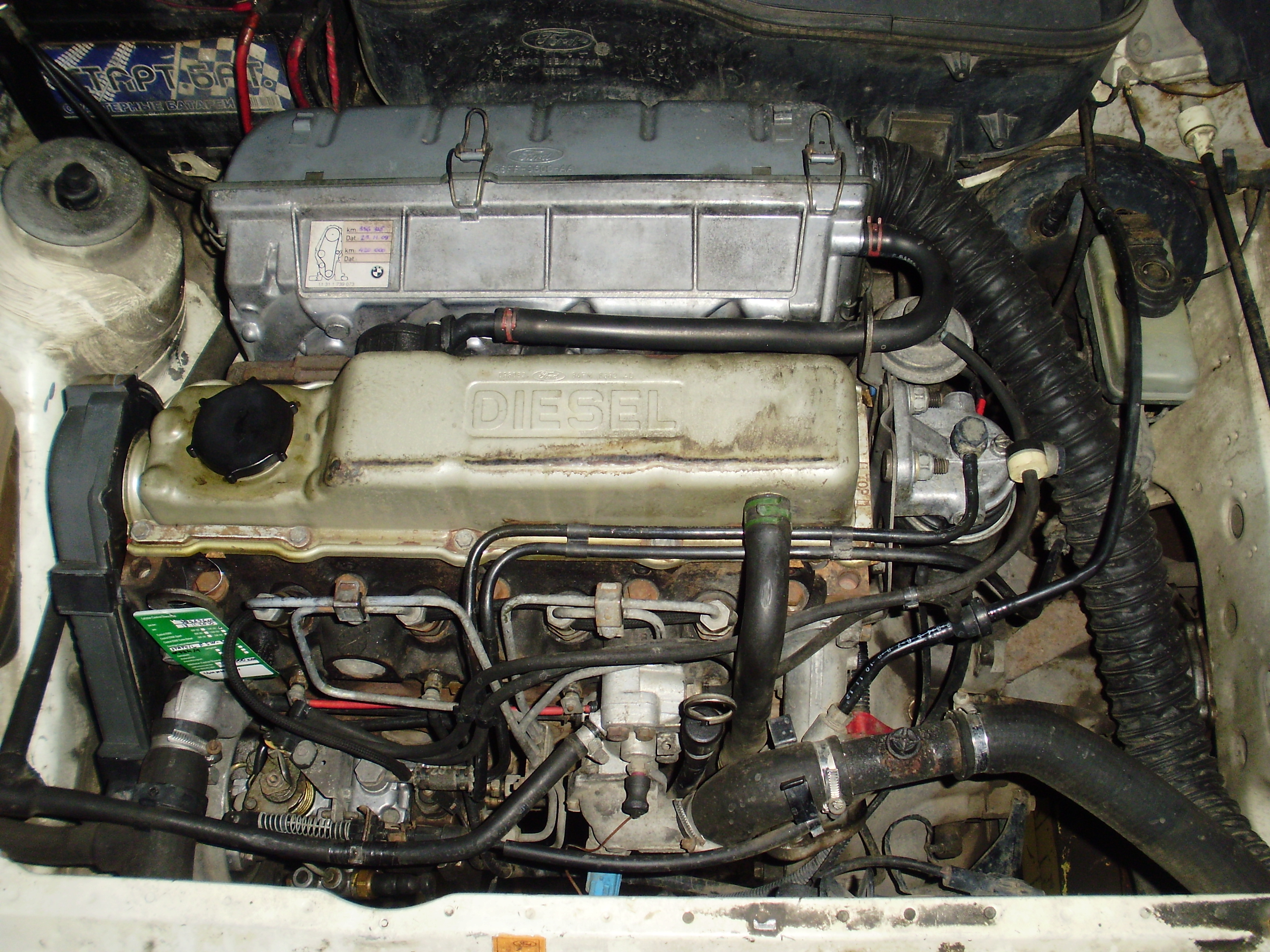
LTC 1.6-liter engine in a 1988 Ford Escort

The Ford LT engine (sometimes referred to as the "Dagenham") is a 1.6-litre diesel power inline-four engine used in the Ford Escort as well as its Orion and Escort Van derivatives. It was also installed in the Ford Fiesta Mark 2.

== Design ==
The LT was designed from the beginning exclusively to be a diesel engine, eliminating any compromises required for a design also intended to run on petrol. It was built exclusively at the Ford Dagenham plant. Design work was carried out with the help of German diesel specialists Deutz, who already had a relationship with Ford in providing engines for the heavier-duty Ford Cargos. Output is 40 kW (54 PS; 54 hp) at 4800 rpm. The crankshaft has five bearings and the glowplugs were of the quicker in-cylinder type, reducing pre-heating times to between 7 and 12 seconds depending on the outside temperature.
