= Donkervoort P24 RS =

Sports car by Donkervoort

Overview
- Manufacturer: Donkervoort
- Production: 2026-present

Body and chassis
- Class: Sports car (S)
- Body style: 2-door targa top
- Layout: Front-mid engine, rear-wheel-drive
- Doors: Butterfly doors

Powertrain
- Engine: 3.5 L twin-turbocharged EcoBoost V6
- Transmission: 5-speed manual transmission with Torsen limited-slip differential

Dimensions
- Wheelbase: 2,420 mm (95.3 in)
- Length: 4,000 mm (157.5 in)
- Width: 1,912 mm (75.3 in)
- Height: 1,105 mm (43.5 in)
- Kerb weight: 780 kg (1,720 lb)

Chronology
- Predecessor: Donkervoort F22

The Donkervoort P24 RS is a limited production sports car by Dutch company Donkervoort.

== Background ==
The P24 RS was first presented as the successor to the F22 in January 2026. Of the 150 units to be built, over 50 had already been sold at the time of its unveiling. The car is named after Denis Donkervoort's second daughter, Phébe, who was born in 2024. It will be the first Donkervoort available in right-hand drive, with fewer than 30 units being made in the configuration.

== Specifications ==
The two-seater P24 RS is 4 metres (157.5 in) long, 1.91 m (75.2 in) wide, and 1.10 m (43.3 in) tall. Its wheelbase is 2.42 m (95.3 in), and its trunk capacity is 298 liters. It has butterfly doors. A spoiler package for track use is available as an option and can be easily installed.

Instead of the 2.5-liter EA855 DOHC inline-5 gasoline engine from Audi used in the previous model, the P24 RS uses a 3.5 L twin-turbocharged V6, heavily developed EcoBoost gasoline engine from Ford. It is made of aluminum and has dry-sump lubrication. Three power output levels are available to choose at any time, with a maximum of 441 kW (591 hp). A 5-speed manual transmission with a Torsen differential transfers power to the rear wheels. The top speed is stated as over 300 km/h (186 mph). The maximum lateral acceleration is 2.3 g.
