= Donkervoort F22 =

Sports car by Donkervoort

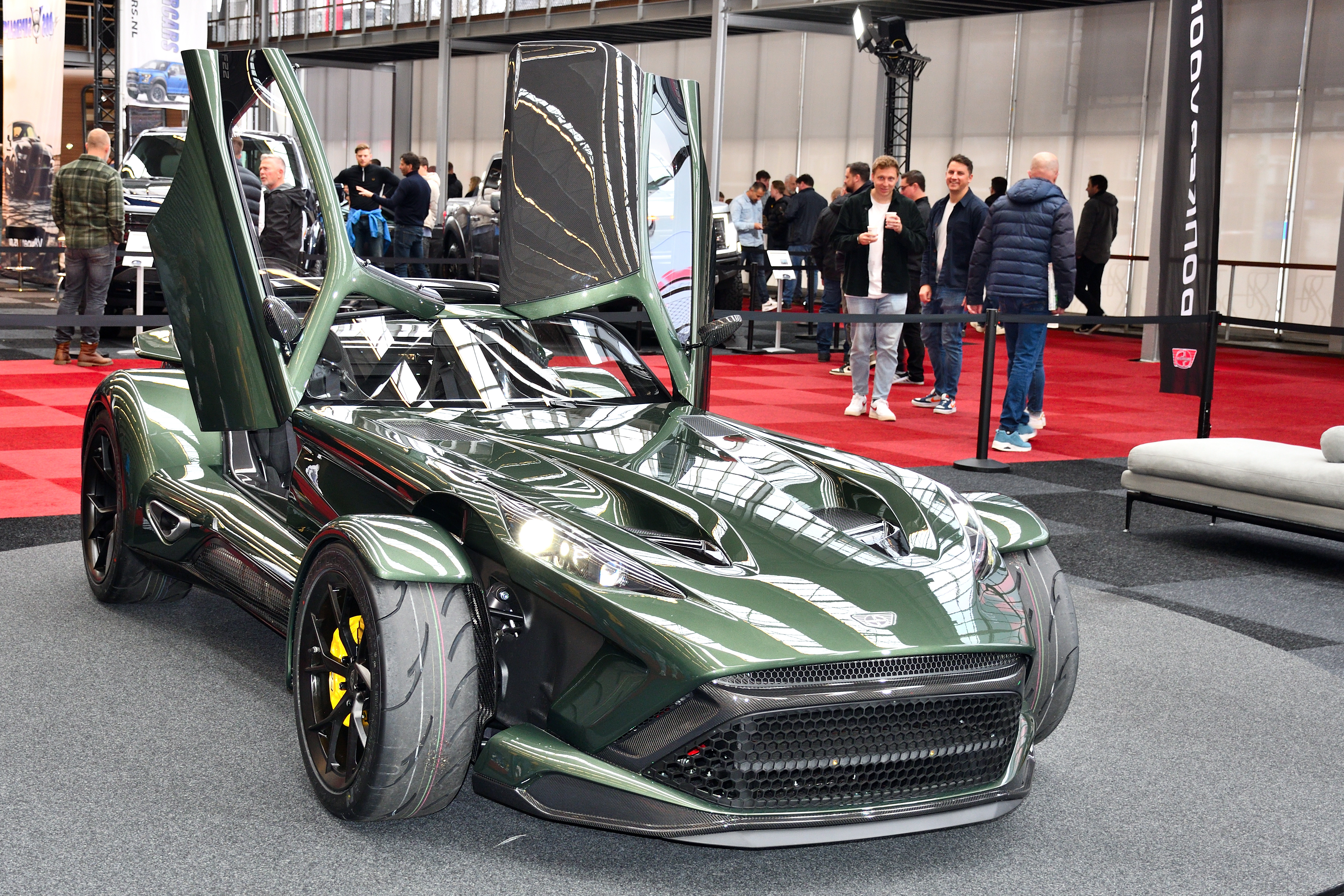

Overview
- Manufacturer: Donkervoort
- Production: 2022 - 2025 (limited to 100 units)
- Model years: 2023
- Designer: Jordi Wiersma; Denis Donkervoort; Amko Leenarts

Body and chassis
- Class: Sports car (S)
- Body style: 2-door targa top
- Layout: Front-mid engine, rear-wheel-drive
- Doors: Butterfly doors

Powertrain
- Engine: 2,480 cc (151.3 cu in) Audi EA855 turbocharged inline-5
- Transmission: 5-speed manual transmission with Torsen limited-slip differential

Dimensions
- Wheelbase: 2,420 mm (95.3 in)
- Length: 4,039 mm (159.0 in)
- Width: 1,912 mm (75.3 in)
- Height: 1,105 mm (43.5 in)
- Kerb weight: 750 kg (1,653 lb)

Chronology
- Predecessor: Donkervoort D8
- Successor: Donkervoort P24 RS

The Donkervoort F22 is a limited production sports car by Dutch company Donkervoort. The successor to the D8 GTO, it is Donkervoort's first completely in-house design. Originally limited to 50 units, however, due to demand the production run was extended to 75 units and later to 100 units.

== Background ==
Donkervoort is a Dutch carmaker that started off in 1978 making replicas of the Lotus Seven. Each of Donkervoort's successive models till the F22 have been a modification/evolution of sorts of the original Seven, with more powerful powertrains and other modifications such as stronger suspension. Designed by Donkervoort founder Denis Donkervoort alongside Donkervoort technical director Jordi Wiersma under guidance of Amko Leenarts, the F22 is Donkervoort's first in-house design, and does not share a single part with its predecessor, the D8 GTO. Significant effort has gone into weight reduction, the body is made entirely from carbon fibre, the steel tube spaceframe is also clad in carbon fibre. The amount of carbon fibre parts has also been reduced from 98 in the D8 GTO to 54 in the F22. The F22's name is unrelated to the Lockheed Martin F-22 Raptor, instead, it is named after Denis Donkervoort's firstborn daughter, Filippa, who was born on 22 May 2022.

== Specifications ==
The F22 uses the same EA855 DOHC inline-5 found in the Audi RS3. Donkervoort has made several modifications, including fitting a larger turbocharger, a higher compression ratio and an engine control unit remap to give the EA855 a new power output of 500 PS (493 hp; 368 kW) at 6,360 rpm, and a new torque output of 640 N⋅m (472 lb⋅ft) at 5,150 rpm. That power is sent exclusively to the rear wheels via a 5-speed manual transmission and a Torsen limited-slip differential, the former of which equipped with Bosch rev-matching technology. The 10x19 in rear wheels are shod in 275/35 Nankang AR1s, and the front 8x18 in wheels are shod in 235/40 AR1s. AP Racing brakes, which Donkervoort claims are 10 kg (22 lb) lighter than the outgoing D8 GTO's, provide stopping power with four-piston calipers on all wheels, with 330 mm (13.0 in) front discs and 279 mm (11.0 in) rear discs. Independent double wishbone suspension is situated at the front and rear, although the rear also gains a pair of trailing arms. Active shock absorbers give the F22 an adjustable ride height, allowing travel of up to 35 mm (1.4 in). The F22's use of Formula One-grade carbon fibre in the chassis has given the F22 a reported 100% increase in torsional rigidity compared to the D8 GTO, in order to account for the car's claimed maximum lateral acceleration of 2.15 g, and a claimed dry weight of 750 kg (1,653 lb).
