= Bilster Berg =

Motor racing circuit in Pömbsen, Germany

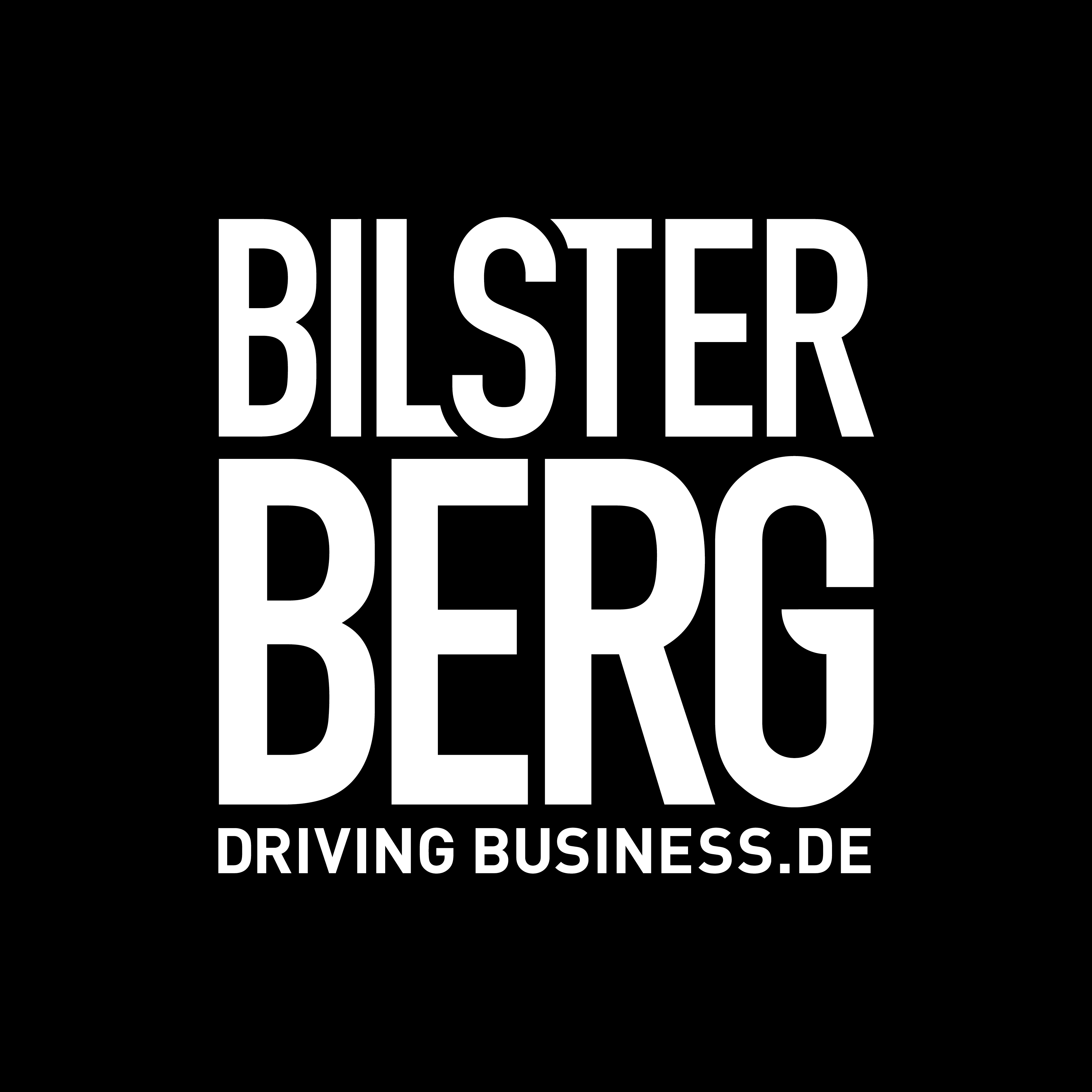

- Full Circuit (2013–present)
- Location: Bad Driburg, North Rhine-Westphalia, Germany
- Coordinates: 51°47′32″N 9°4′0.8″E
- Broke ground: 27 September 2011; 14 years ago
- Opened: 11 April 2013; 13 years ago
- Construction cost: €34 million
- Architect: Hermann Tilke
- Website: bilster-berg.de

Full Circuit (2013–present)
- Surface: Asphalt
- Length: 2.656 mi (4.274 km)
- Turns: 19

Ostschleife (2013–present)
- Length: 1.491 mi (2.400 km)
- Turns: 10

Westschleife (2013–present)
- Length: 1.146 mi (1.845 km)
- Turns: 12

The Bilster Berg Drive Resort is a private motorsports club for automotive enthusiasts and manufacturers with a 4.274 km (2.656 mi) long motor racing circuit in Pömbsen, a district of the village of Bad Driburg in the Teutoburg Forest. The track is built on land formerly used by the British Army as an ammunition depot; it was designed by Hermann Tilke, with input from Walter Röhrl.

== History ==
The site was used since the 1970s as an ammunition depot for the British Army of the Rhine. When Great Britain withdrew its forces in 1993 following German reunification, the 85 ha (210-acre) site reverted to its previous owner, Count Marcus von Oeynhausen-Sierstorpff. The Count, a motorsports enthusiast, thought the site would be suitable for a motorsports track; his earlier attempt to build a track there was stymied by the 2008 financial crisis. It was the first track built in West Germany in 80 years, and was designed by Hermann Tilke, who waxed enthusiastically about building a track with a constant gradient.

== Design ==
Because of its seclusion and relative anonymity, it was envisioned that it could be used for sensitive driving exercises, including manufacturer testing and advanced driving instruction for bodyguards or special forces.

The track features 200 m (660 ft) of elevation change over its 4.274 km (2.656 mi) length, with maximum gradients of +21/-26% through 44 crests and dips and 19 turns.

In 2019, the driving simulator software RaceRoom added Bilster Berg to its tracks.

== Lap times ==
Bilster Berg does not record official lap times; in 2014, the Donkervoort D8 GTO set a lap record for regular production vehicles at 1:46.120, which the firm celebrated by releasing a limited Bilster Berg Edition. Lars Kern set a new record of 1:43.100 in a Porsche 911 (991.2) GT3 RS in 2020.

The Volkswagen ID.R electric time attack car set the unofficial overall track record in 2020 with a lap time of 1:24.206.

== See also ==
- Circuito Ascari, a similar race resort in Spain
- Monticello Motor Club, a race resort in New York (state)
