= Donkervoort EVx Vision =

Full-electric concept car

Donkervoort EVx Vision is a Donkervoort full-electric concept car, designed in 2019 by One One Lab - Design Studio, in co-operation with Mad Academy. It was made as a prototype design car, but did not go in to production by Donkervoort.
