= Donkervoort D8 =

Motor vehicle

Donkervoort D8 Series
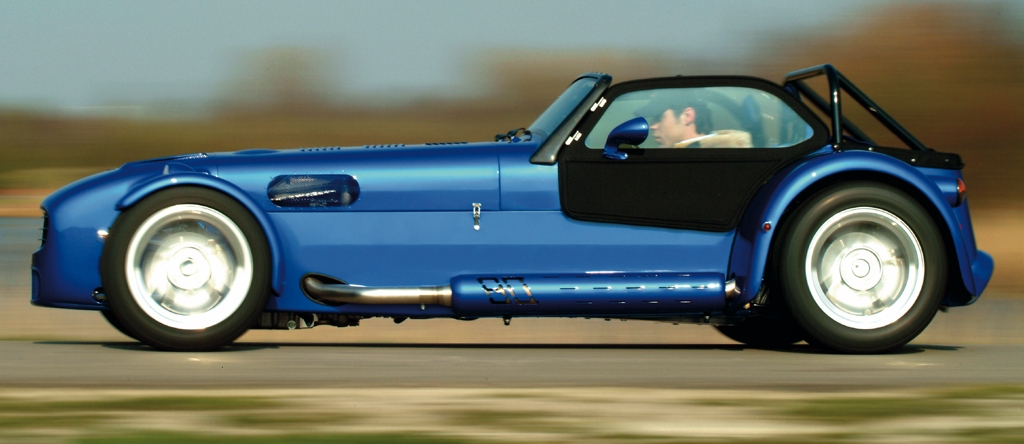
- Donkervoort D8 Wide Track on a race track

Overview
- Manufacturer: Donkervoort
- Model years: 1993–2022
- Assembly: Lelystad, Netherlands

Body and chassis
- Class: Sports car (S)
- Body style: 2-door coupe (2007–2012); 2-door convertible (1993–2022)
- Layout: FMR layout
- Doors: Butterfly

Powertrain
- Engine: 1.8 L Audi R4 20v turbocharged I4 (1999–2012); 1.8 L & 2.0 L Ford Zeta I4 (D8 Zetec); 2.0 L Ford-Cosworth YB Turbo I4 (D8 Cosworth); 2.5 L Audi R5 20v TFSI I5 (2013–2022)
- Transmission: 5-speed manual

Dimensions
- Wheelbase: 2,350 mm (92.5 in)
- Length: 3,740 mm (147.2 in)
- Width: 1,850 mm (72.8 in)
- Height: 1,140 mm (44.9 in)
- Curb weight: 695–730 kg (1,532–1,609 lb)

Chronology
- Predecessor: Donkervoort S7
- Successor: Donkervoort F22

The Donkervoort D8 is a series of ultra-light weight sports cars manufactured by Dutch car manufacturer Donkervoort in Lelystad, Netherlands since 1993. They have been produced in several variants, starting with the original Donkervoort D8 Zetec (1993-1998), which used engines made by Ford; since 1999, the cars have used engines built by German automobile manufacturer Audi.

== Models ==
Donkervoort D8 key specifications
Model		Engine	Output	Weight	Dimensions (L×W×H/WB)	Notes/Refs.
Zetec	Classic	1.8L or 2.0L DOHC Ford Zetec	140 or 160 hp (104 or 119 kW)	570 kg (1,257 lb)	3,410 mm × 1,730 mm × 1,100 mm / 2,300 mm (134 in × 68 in × 43 in / 91 in)	
Zetec	Sport	1.8L or 2.0L DOHC Ford Zetec	140 or 160 hp (104 or 119 kW)	570 kg (1,257 lb)	3,410 mm × 1,730 mm × 1,100 mm / 2,300 mm (134 in × 68 in × 43 in / 91 in)	
Cosworth	Classic	2.0T DOHC Cosworth YB	220 or 280 hp (164 or 209 kW)	695 kg (1,532 lb)	3,410 mm × 1,730 mm × 1,100 mm / 2,300 mm (134 in × 68 in × 43 in / 91 in)	
Cosworth	Sport	2.0T DOHC Cosworth YB	220 or 280 hp (164 or 209 kW)	695 kg (1,532 lb)	3,410 mm × 1,730 mm × 1,100 mm / 2,300 mm (134 in × 68 in × 43 in / 91 in)	
Audi	AGU	1.8T DOHC Audi R4 20v	150 / 180 / 210 hp (112 / 134 / 157 kW)	630 kg (1,389 lb)	3,410 mm × 1,730 mm × 1,100 mm / 2,300 mm (134 in × 68 in × 43 in / 91 in)	
Audi	E-gas Wide Track	1.8T DOHC Audi R4 20v	150 / 180 / 210 hp (112 / 134 / 157 kW)	630 kg (1,389 lb)	3,410 mm × 1,730 mm × 1,100 mm / 2,300 mm (134 in × 68 in × 43 in / 91 in)	
Audi	269 (RS)	1.8T DOHC Audi R4 20v	269 hp (201 kW)	630 kg (1,389 lb)	3,410 mm × 1,730 mm × 1,100 mm / 2,300 mm (134 in × 68 in × 43 in / 91 in)	
Audi	GT	1.8T DOHC Audi R4 20v	180 / 210 / 270 hp (134 / 157 / 201 kW)	650 kg (1,433 lb)	3,710 mm × 1,730 mm × 1,100 mm / 2,300 mm (146 in × 68 in × 43 in / 91 in)	
GTO	Touring	2.5L DOHC Audi R5 20v TFSI	340 hp (254 kW)	730 kg (1,609 lb)	3,740 mm × 1,850 mm × 1,140 mm / 2,350 mm (147 in × 73 in × 45 in / 93 in)	
GTO	Performance	2.5L DOHC Audi R5 20v TFSI	380 hp (283 kW)	695 kg (1,532 lb)	3,740 mm × 1,850 mm × 1,140 mm / 2,350 mm (147 in × 73 in × 45 in / 93 in)	
GTO-S	(Sport)	2.5L DOHC Audi R5 20v TFSI	340 hp (254 kW)	740 kg (1,631 lb)	3,740 mm × 1,850 mm × 1,140 mm / 2,350 mm (147 in × 73 in × 45 in / 93 in)	
GTO-RS		2.5L DOHC Audi R5 20v TFSI	380 hp (283 kW)	695 kg (1,532 lb)	3,833 mm × 1,850 mm × 1,122 mm / 2,340 mm (150.9 in × 72.8 in × 44.2 in / 92.1 in)	
D8 GTO-40		2.5L DOHC Audi R5 20v TFSI	380 hp (283 kW)	678 kg (1,495 lb)	3,836 mm × 1,850 mm × 1,081 mm / 2,350 mm (151.0 in × 72.8 in × 42.6 in / 92.5 in)	40 limited edition D's.
GTO-JD70		2.5L DOHC Audi R5 20v TFSI	415 hp (309 kW)	680 kg (1,499 lb)	3,836 mm × 1,850 mm × 1,081 mm / 2,350 mm (151.0 in × 72.8 in × 42.6 in / 92.5 in)	70 limited edition D's for the owner.

=== Ford engines (1993–1998) ===
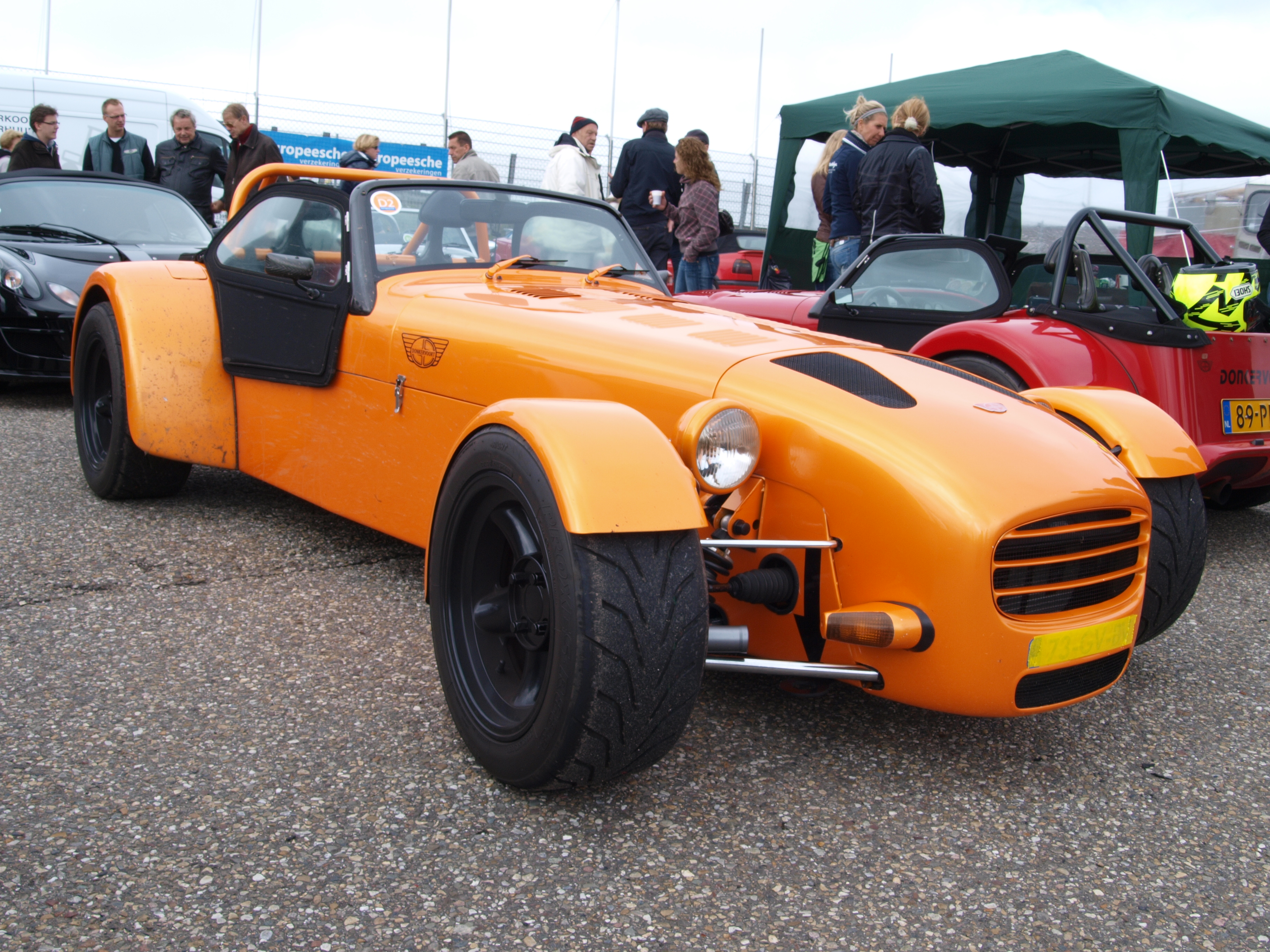
D8 Zetec Sport

The Donkervoort D8 Zetec Classic replaced the Donkervoort S8AT in 1993; while the S8AT used a turbocharged OHC 2.0L Ford engine, the D8 Zetec used the recently introduced Ford Zetec engine (1.8L and 2.0L Zeta engines). In 1994, the Zetec Sport was introduced, with weight reduced by swapping some metal body parts for carbon fibre, downsizing the battery, and replacing the cast iron clutch housing with an aluminum equivalent. Externally, the Classic can be distinguished by the traditional long front fenders which extend from the front wheel to the forward edge of the doors, while the Sport is equipped with cycle fenders covering just the front wheels.

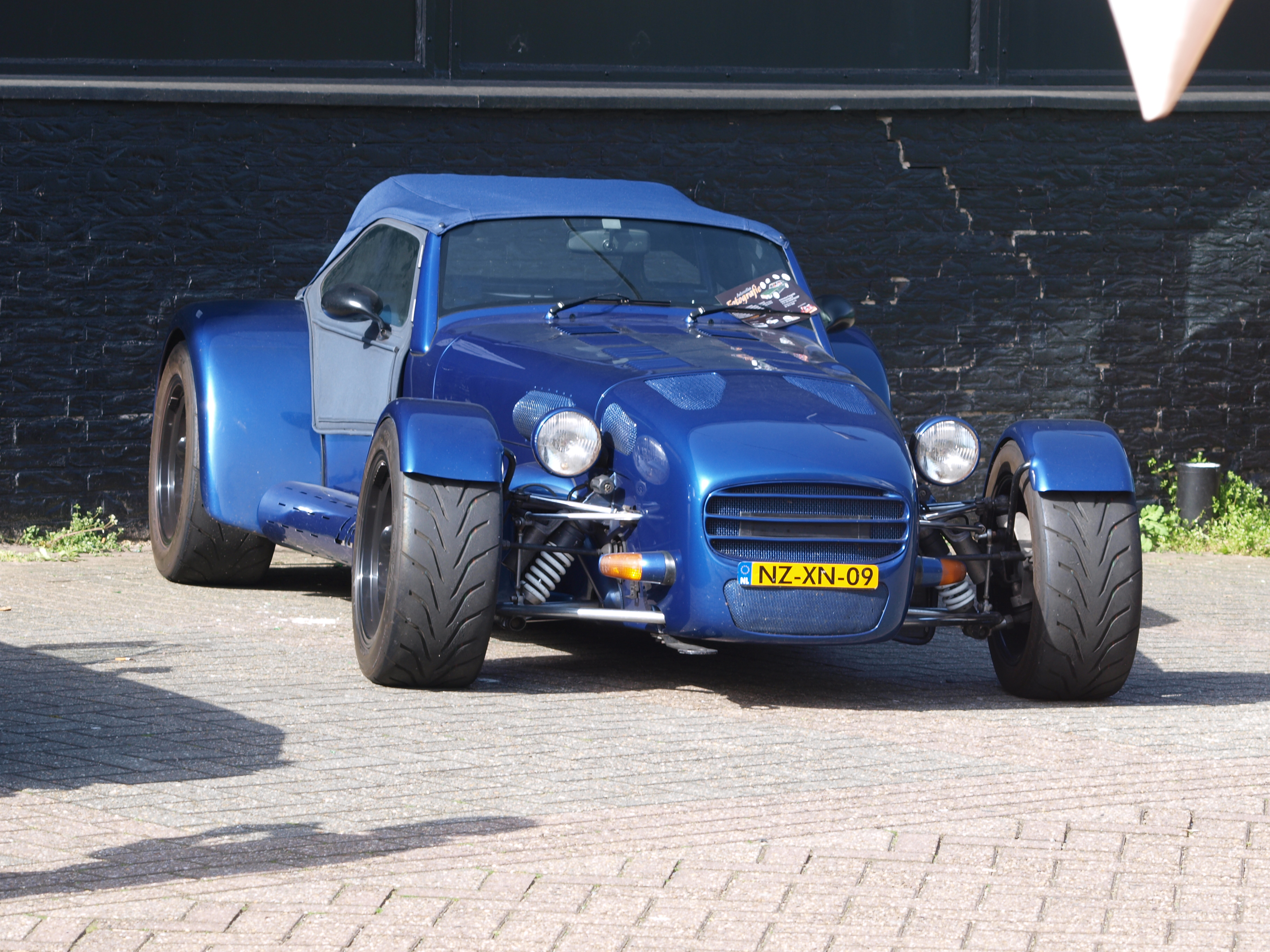
8D Cosworth Sport

The Donkervoort D8 Cosworth was introduced in 1995, available in both Classic and Sport models. The turbocharged Cosworth YB engine, better known as the powerplant for the Ford Sierra and Escort RS Cosworth homologation specials, had an output of either 220 or 280 hp (164 or 209 kW), resulting in a top speed of 235 km/h (146 mph) and acceleration from 0–100 km/h (0–62 mph) of 4.1 to 4.8 seconds. The Cosworth can be distinguished from the Zetec by the number and arrangement of D8s in the bonnet.

=== Audi engines (1999–2012) ===
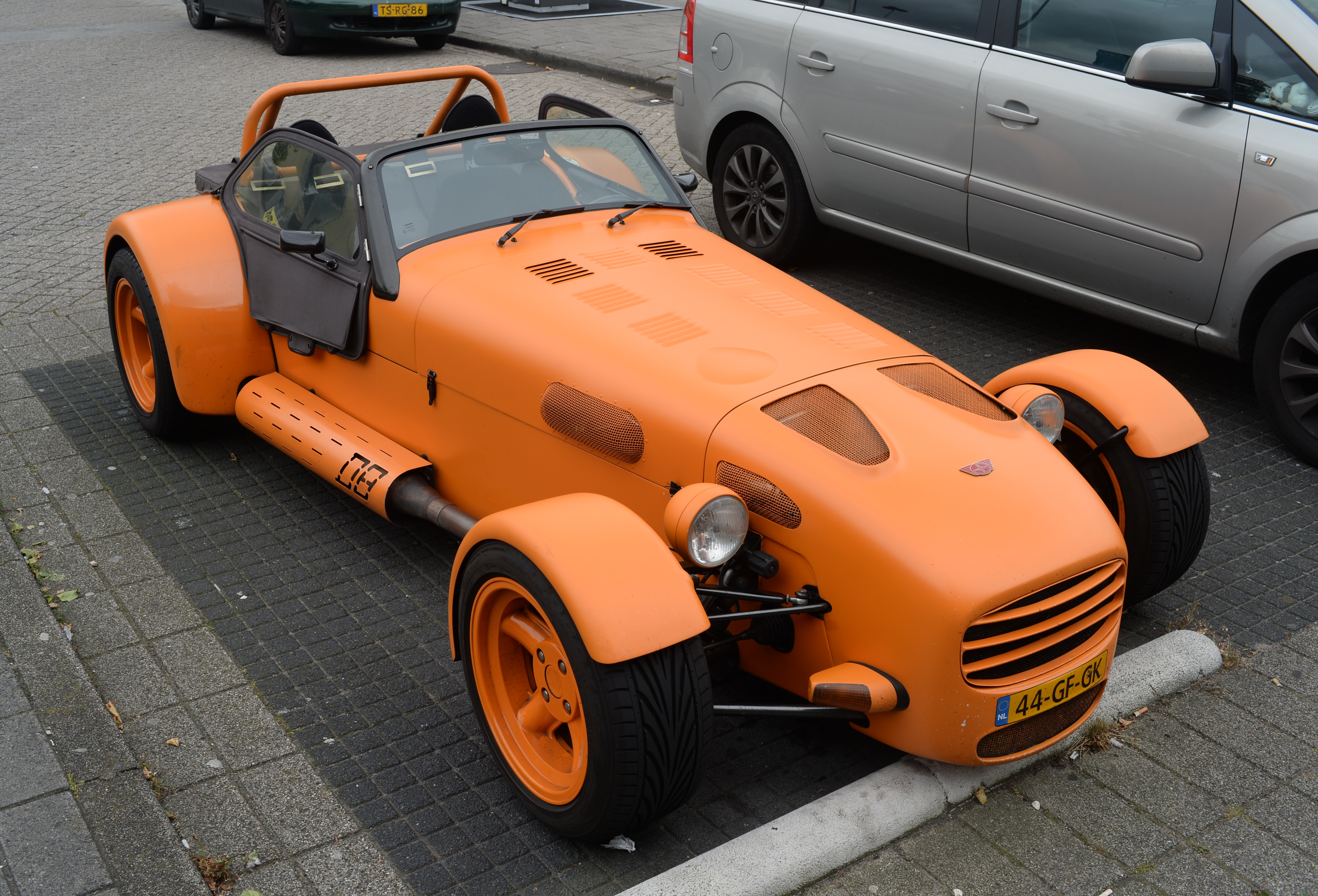
D8 150 (Audi AGU)

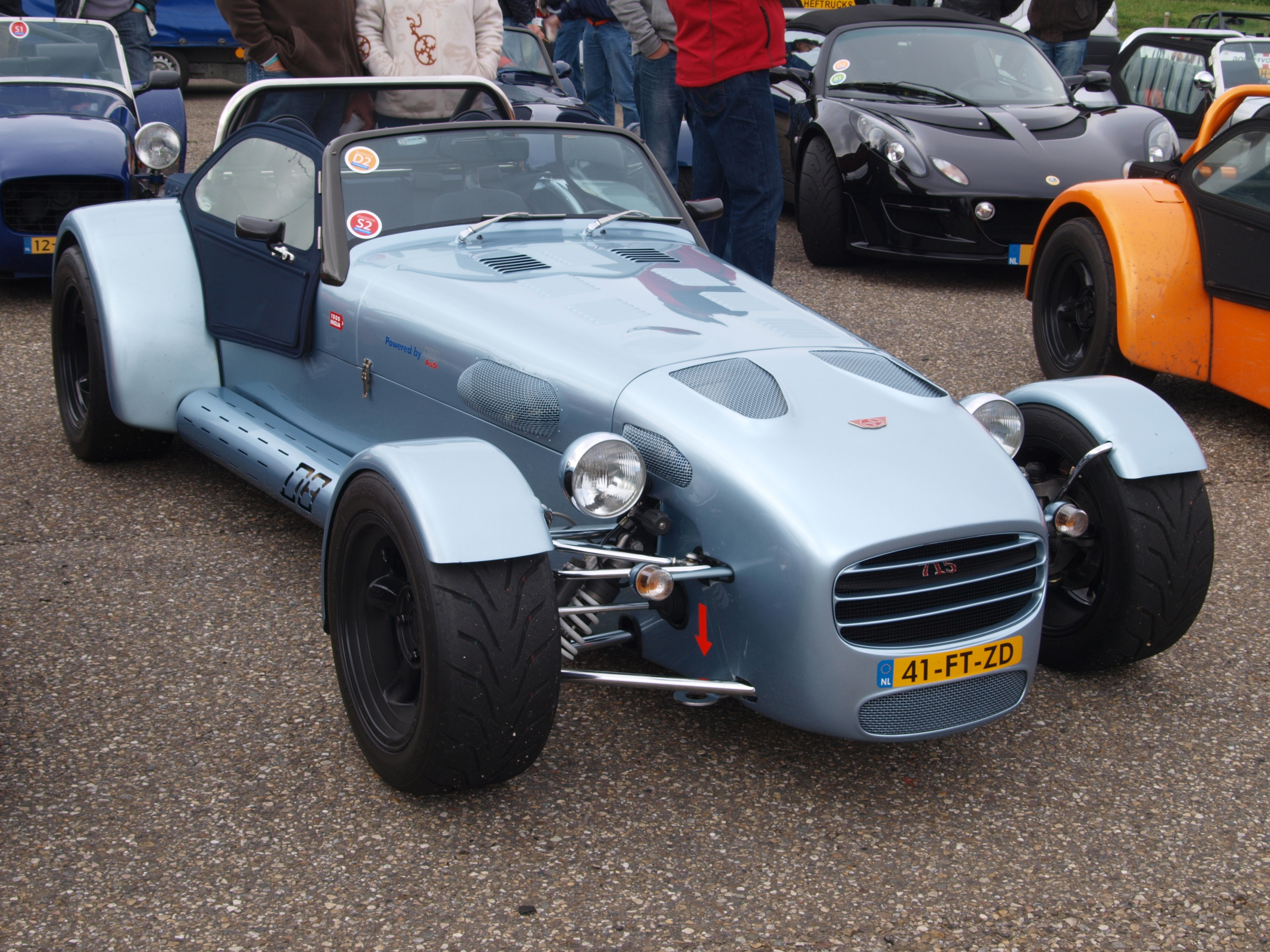
D8 e150 Wide Track (Audi E-gas)

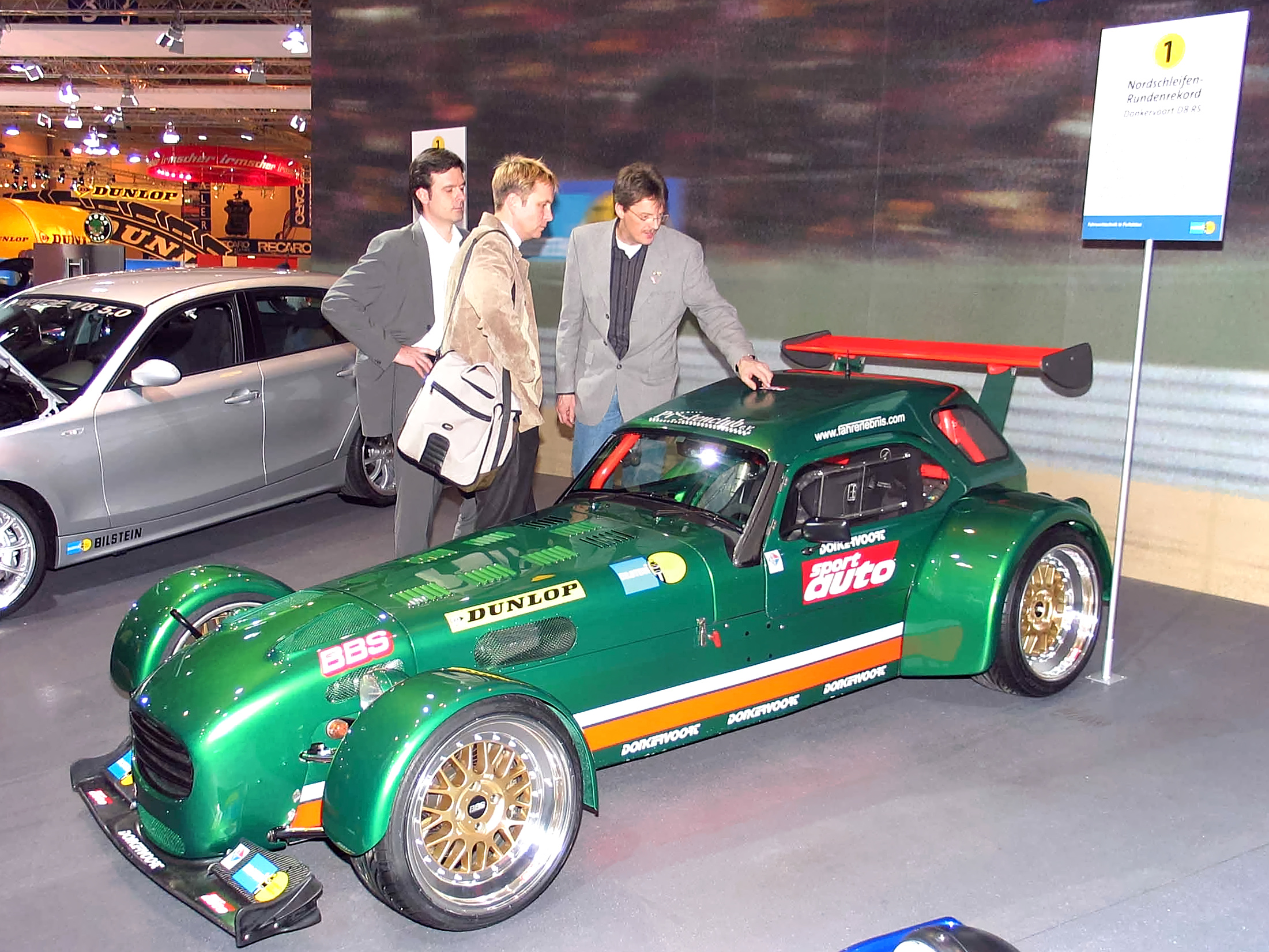
D8 RS prototype with fixed roof and aerodynamic aids used to set Nordschleife record

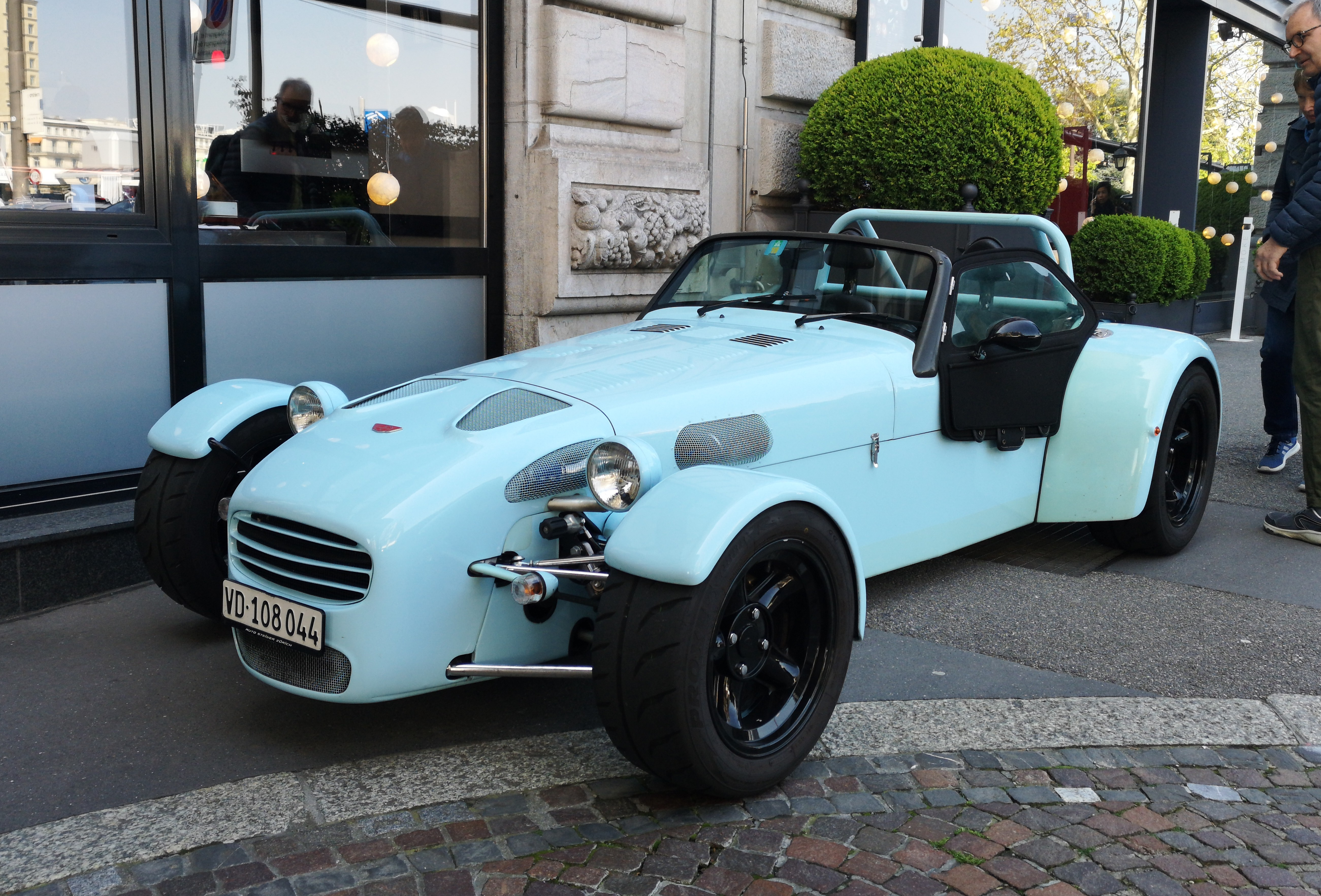
Limited production D8 2-69 RS

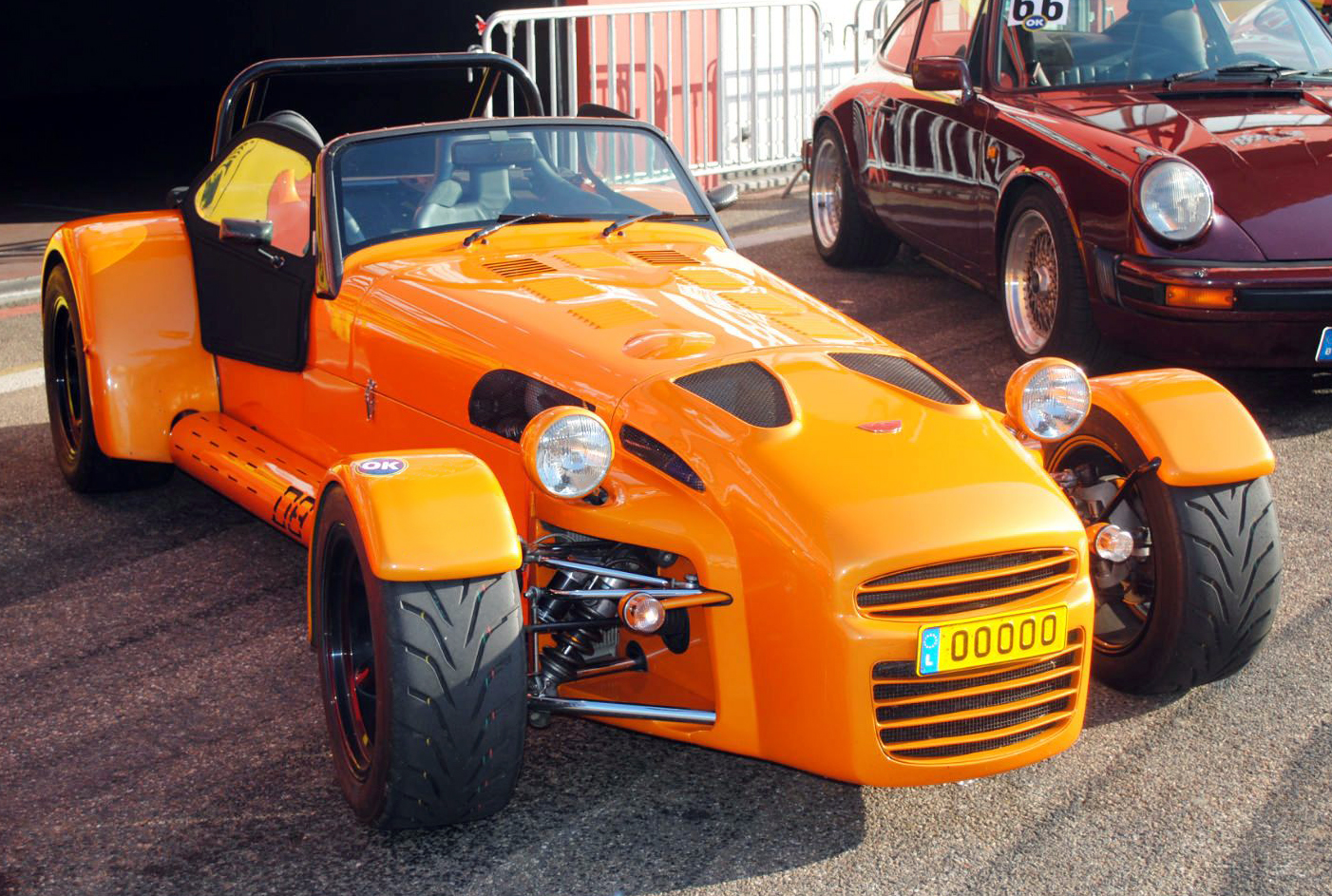
Regular-production D8 2-69

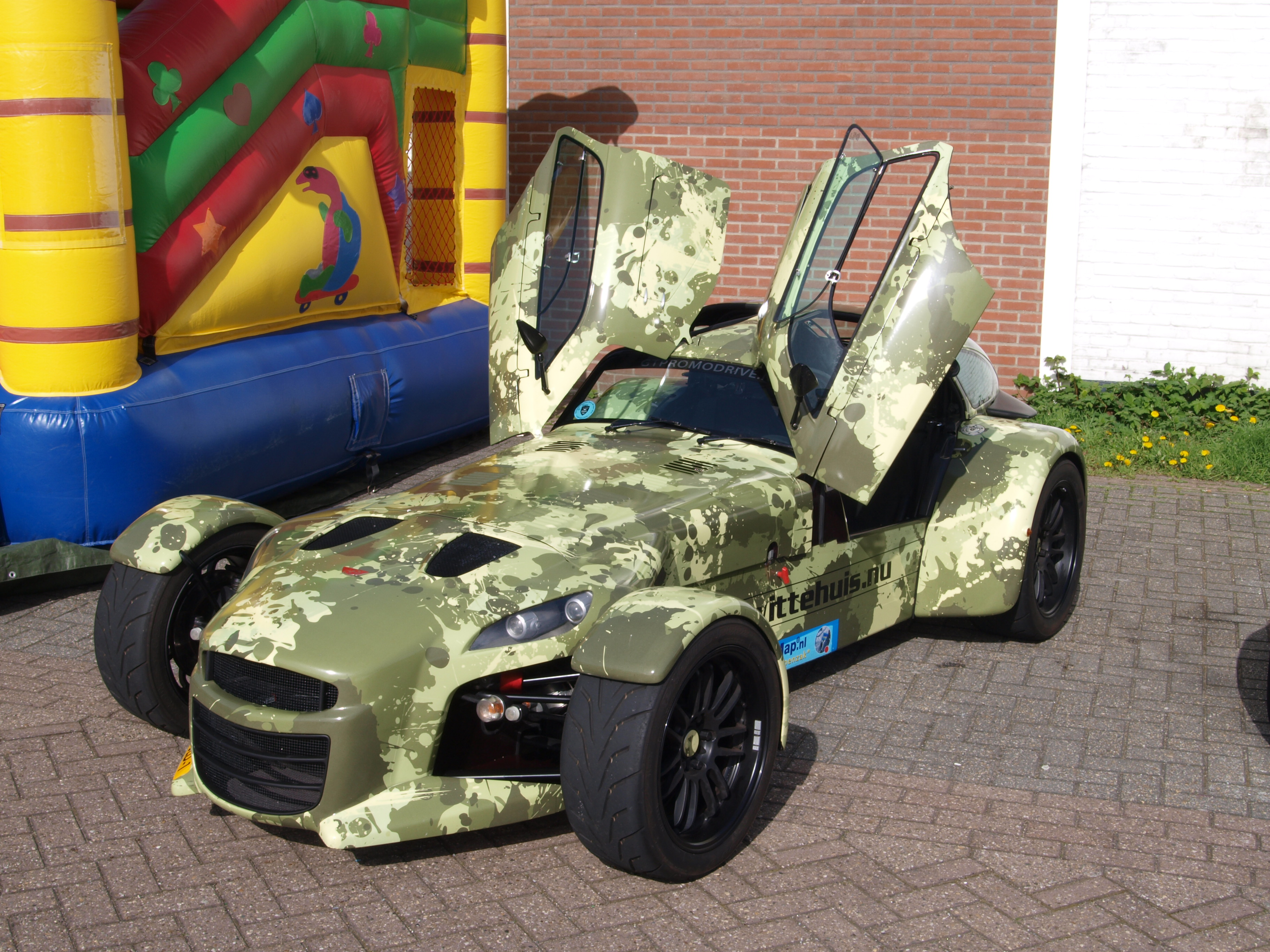
D8 GT

Donkervoort D8 Audi (1999-2003) and D8 (E-gas) Wide Track (2004-2012) followed the Zetec-engined cars. The first Audi model used the 1.8T 20V Audi R4 engine (AGU), with a choice of outputs initially selectable from 150 or 180 hp (112 or 134 kW); in 2003, the Wide Track model was made available with an electronic throttle ("E-gas") version of the same Audi engine. The D8 Sport received an uprated 155 kW (211 PS; 208 hp) version of Audi's turbocharged 1.8-liter engine that year. These were made available as Touring, Sport, and Race models and sometimes carried the nominal output as a designator, for example, the D8 150 was the original Audi (AGU) engine with 150 hp (112 kW) output, while the D8- e210 had the E-gas engine with 210 hp (157 kW).

The chassis of the Audi models was new, using lessons learned from the 20 D's project. Styling of the D8 with Audi engines followed that of the D8 Cosworth Sport, with minor changes to distinguish the former until the Wide Track model received a new nose and front light arrangement along with a wider stance.

In 2004, the Wide Track-based Donkervoort D8 RS broke the lap record for street-legal cars at the Nürburgring Nordschleife by 15 seconds; a limited series of 25 D8's 2-69 RS cars were built with an output of 270 hp (201 kW) and made available to celebrate the lap record; the D8 2-69 subsequently was placed into regular production in 2008. The D8 2-69 was the seventh fastest production car on the Nordschleife in 2011, with a lap time of 7:14.9. The 270 can be distinguished from lower-powered models by the shape of the nose and front grille, which was revised to accommodate a larger cooler and extra radiator on the side.

The first Donkervoort hardtop, the D8 GT, was introduced in 2007 at the Geneva Motor Show. It features butterfly doors for access and a revised headlamp housing; the track was widened by 8 and 4 cm (3.1 and 1.6 in) in the front and rear, respectively; overall length increased by 30 cm (12 in) with no change in wheelbase. Weight increase over the regular D8 cabriolet is minimized by extensive use of carbon fibre in the roof, rear end, doors, and fenders. A similar selection of engine outputs of 180, 210, or 270 hp (134, 157, or 201 kW) was available. Production of GT models was limited to 50 examples per year starting from 2008.

=== GTO (2013–2022) ===
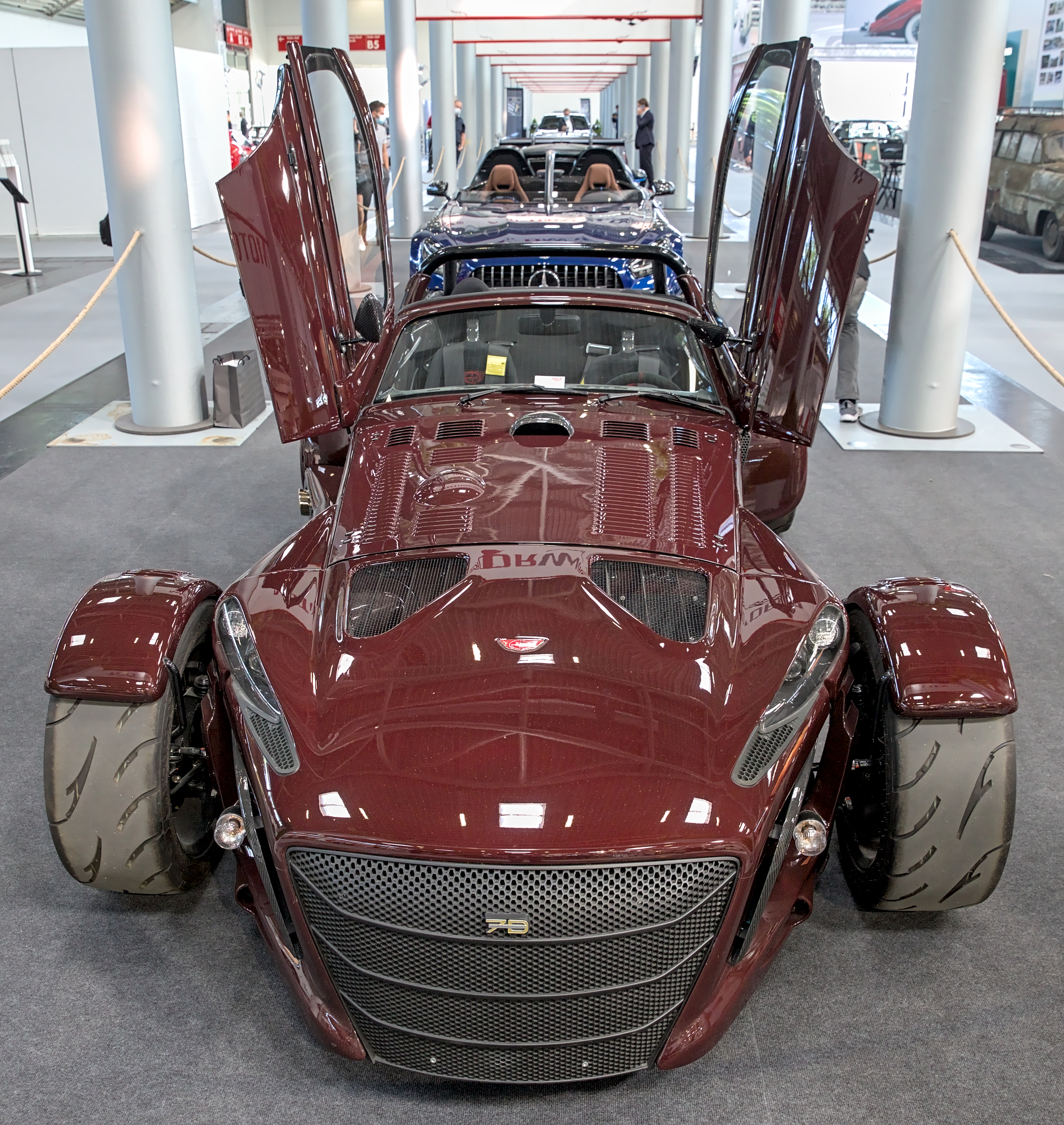
D8 GTO-JD70

Donkervoort announced the next-generation D8 GTO in December 2011, which was larger and slightly heavier than earlier D8's. All GTOs are powered by the five-cylinder 2.5T 20v Audi R5 engine.

The D8 GTO models include the Donkervoort D8 GTO (2013-2021), D8 GTO Premium (2013), D8 GTO Bilster Berg Edition (2014-2015) and the D8 GTO RS (2016-2021). In 2015 the all-carbon fiber GTO Bare Naked Carbon (BNCE) appeared. In 2019 a special edition, Donkervoort D8 GTO-JD70, was created, followed by the Donkervoort D8 GTO-JD70 R the next year, in honor of founder Joop Donkervoort's JD70.

Donkervoort released the Donkervoort D8 GTO Individual Series in September 2021 which offers the ability to customize the vehicle to the client's exact specifications. Donkervoort claims that the only limit is what's legal in the European Union. It also marks the end of D8 production. The starting price is €162,900 but the final price depends on the customizations chosen. Donkervoort released the Donkervoort D8 GTO Individual Series in the US in July 2022; it was the first Donkervoort officially released in the US with a starting price of US$240,000 and the first example was delivered to a buyer in Florida. Two others were shipped to clients in California and Colorado.
