= Donkervoort S8 =

Dutch ultra-light weight sports car

Overview
- Manufacturer: Donkervoort
- Production: 1984–1994
- Model years: 1984–1994
- Assembly: Lelystad, Netherlands

Body and chassis
- Class: Sports car (S)
- Body style: 2-door cabriolet

Powertrain
- Engine: 2.0 L Ford OHC; 2.0 L turbocharged Ford OHC

Dimensions
- Wheelbase: 2,305 mm (90.7 in)
- Length: 3,600 mm (140 in)
- Width: 1,730 mm (68 in)
- Height: 1,070 mm (42 in)
- Curb weight: 675 kg (1,488 lb)

The Donkervoort S8 is an ultra-light weight sports car manufactured by Donkervoort in Lelystad, Netherlands, between 1983 and 1993. It is the second model produced by Donkervoort, succeeding the Donkervoort S7. Three models were produced, the Donkervoort S8, the Donkervoort S8A, and the Donkervoort S8AT. It was replaced by the Donkervoort D10 in 1988 which was in turn replaced by the Donkervoort D8 in 1993.
