= Donkervoort D10 =

Dutch ultra-light weight sports car

Overview
- Manufacturer: Donkervoort
- Production: 1988–1989
- Model years: 1988–1989
- Assembly: Lelystad, Netherlands

Body and chassis
- Class: Sports car (S)
- Body style: 2-door cabriolet

Powertrain
- Engine: 2,160 cc Ford Garrett T3 turbocharger

Dimensions
- Wheelbase: 2,305 mm (90.7 in)
- Length: 3,400 mm (130 in)
- Width: 1,730 mm (68 in)
- Height: 980 mm (39 in)
- Curb weight: 650 kg (1,430 lb)

Donkervoort D10 is an ultra-light weight sports car manufactured by Donkervoort in Lelystad, Netherlands between 1988 and 1994. It is the third in series of Donkervoort sports cars, the two previous models being Donkervoort S7 and Donkervoort S8. It was first produced for celebrating Donkervoort's 10th anniversary.
