= Joop Donkervoort =

Dutch businessman

- Born: 22 August 1949 (age 76)
- Known for: Donkervoort (Founder)
- Spouse: Marianne Donkervoort
- Children: Denis; Amber

Joop A. Donkervoort (born 22 August 1949) is a Dutch businessman and founder of Donkervoort car manufacturer of Netherlands.

== Education ==
Joop Donkervoort originally wanted to go to the Art Academy, but under pressure from his father, director of a technical company that made manometers, among other things, he started studying Mechanical Engineering at the MTS in Rotterdam. After that he studied at the Institute for the Car Trade and did an internship in France at DAF for some time.

== Career ==
In the Netherlands, he worked for a while at seat belt manufacturer Dynasafe. He also worked at Renault as a service inspector. In his spare time he liked to work on improving the Lotus Seven. After some time he bought the importer of the Lotus Seven, but that turned out to be a bad buy, because the Lotus Seven did not yet have a type approval for the Netherlands, and was therefore illegal. Every time money had to be added to the project, which he received from his father, or by increasing his mortgage. Due to improvements to the model, he eventually obtained a type approval from the Netherlands Vehicle Authority (RDW) around 1973 and began to deliver the car himself as kits. This resulted in his own brand: Donkervoort.

== Company ==
The first factory was in Tienhoven. When expansion was necessary, the factory moved to Loosdrecht. In 1995 Donkervoort participated in the race he founded for the Donkervoort cup.

The Donkervoort factory has been located in Lelystad since 2000.
