= Ford Zeta engine =

Zetec engine
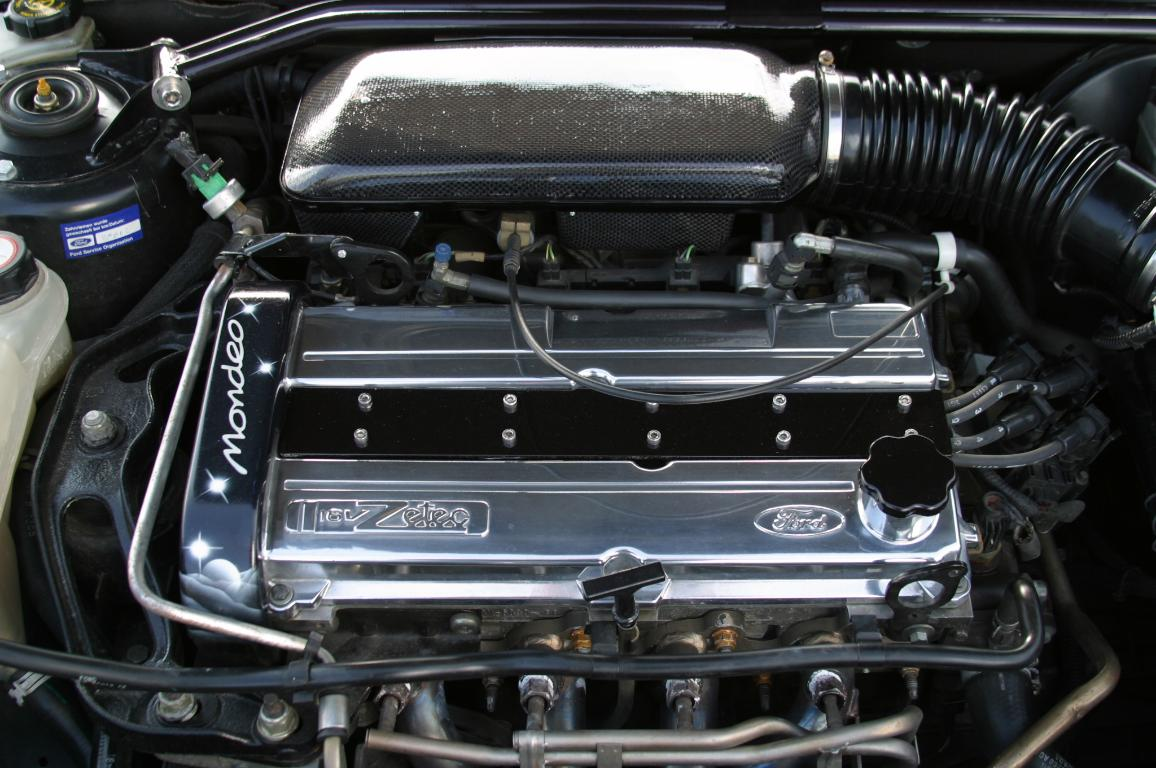
- 1.8 L Zetec-E engine

Overview
- Manufacturer: Ford
- Also called: MVH
- Production: 1991 – December 2004

Layout
- Configuration: I4
- Displacement: 1,597 cc (97.5 cu in); 1,598 cc (97.5 cu in); 1,769 cc (108.0 cu in); 1,988 cc (121.3 cu in); 1,989 cc (121.4 cu in)
- Cylinder bore: 80.0 mm (3.15 in); 84.8 mm (3.34 in)
- Piston stroke: 88.0 mm (3.46 in)
- Cylinder block material: Cast iron
- Cylinder head material: Aluminum
- Valvetrain: DOHC
- Compression ratio: 9.6:1; 10.2:1

Combustion
- Fuel system: Multi-port fuel injection
- Fuel type: Gasoline
- Oil system: Wet sump
- Cooling system: Water-cooled

Chronology
- Predecessor: Ford Pinto engine; Ford CVH engine
- Successor: Ford Duratec engine

Developed in the late 1980s by the Ford Motor Company, the Ford Zeta engine was a straight four, double overhead cam internal combustion engine intended to replace the Pinto and CVH models.

The Zeta shared some parts with other Ford engines developed at the time, including the smaller Sigma I4 and larger Duratec V6. The engine shares its bore and stroke dimensions with the 2-valve CVH engine. Ford Power Products sells the Zeta in 1.8 L and 2.0 L versions as the MVH. It is a commonly held myth that the Zeta is merely a DOHC 16-valve development of the CVH, but whilst the cylinder blocks have similarities - this is largely to do with the need to attach the engine to legacy transmissions and mounting points on existing models and also the Zeta was also made in the same factory on the same production tooling; the blocks are not actually interchangeable.

Production of the engines, renamed Zetec (the rename occurred because Lancia owned the "Zeta" trademark), began at Ford's Bridgend plant in Wales in September 1991, with later production added at Cologne, Germany in 1992 and Chihuahua, Chihuahua, Mexico, in 1993. The first Zetecs displaced 1.8 L, with a 2.0 L version arriving quickly afterwards. The final Zeta Zetec was produced on December 10, 2004 at the Bridgend factory with over 3,500,000 built at that location.

The engine fits the Ford T9, BC5/iB5, G5M/G25MR, CD4E and MTX-75 gearboxes using the same bell bolt pattern as the Crossflow.

== Phases of Production ==
Zetec Variants
Features	Phase 1	Phase 2	Phase 3
Cam Shaft Cover	Aluminium	Aluminium	Early: Black Coated Magnesium / Later: Plastic
Label on Cam Cover	DOHC 16v	16v Zetec	16v Zetec
Sump	Single Part Aluminium	Single Part Aluminium	Two Part: Aluminium & Steel
Water Pump	Directly Above Crank	Directly Above Crank	Offset to Exhaust Side of Crank
Oil Filter	Angled Downwards	Angled Downwards	Horizontal
Cam Belt Cover	Plastic	Plastic	Plastic / Aluminium
Cam Followers	Hydraulic	Hydraulic	Solid

== Overview of applications ==
Zetec manufacturing facilities
Factory	Market
Bridgend, Wales	Europe
Cologne, Germany	Europe
Valencia, Spain	Europe
Chihuahua, Mexico	North America
Zhongli, Taiwan	Asia
İnönü, Turkey	Various

- 1992–05/1998 — Ford Mondeo Mk 1 1.6 90 bhp (Engine codes: L1F, L1J)
- 05/1998–2001 — Ford Mondeo Mk 2 1.6 88 bhp (Engine codes: L1N, L1Q)
- Ford Fiesta Mk 3 1992–1995 (1.6 90 bhp Si) (1.8 105 bhp S/XR2i 16V) (1.8 130 bhp RS1800)
- Ford Escort 1992–1998 (Europe) (1.6 90 bhp Si) (1.8 105/130 bhp XR3i) (1.8 115 bhp Si/GTi)
- 1995–2000 Ford Contour and Mercury Mystique
- 1999–2002 Mercury Cougar
- 2000–2003 Ford Escape and Mazda Tribute
- 2000–2003 Ford Focus Mk 1
- 1998–2003 Ford Escort ZX2.
- Formula Ford 2000 series (2003–present)
- Donkervoort D8 Classic
- Donkervoort D8 Sport

== 2.0 ==
The 2.0 L Zetec shared its 84.8 mm (3.339 in) bore and 88.0 mm (3.465 in) stroke with its predecessor, the 2.0 L 2-valve CVH. On top of the 16 Valve DOHC head, the Zetec for the US Market Escort ZX2, Contour, and Cougar gained Variable Valve Timing on the Exhaust Cam, removing its requirement of EGR for US Emissions. The SVT variant was equipped with Variable Valve Timing on the Intake Cam.

A high 10.2:1 compression ratio and larger valves contributed to the SVT version's much higher output; while a special ECU tune that modified the Variable Valve Timing, among other settings, contributed to the 10% power increase on the ZX2 S/R.

Applications:

- 1995–2000 Ford Contour
- 1995–2000 Mercury Mystique
- 1998–2003 Ford Escort (North America) ZX2, 130 hp (97 kW) and 127 lb⋅ft (172 N⋅m)
- 1999–2000 Ford Escort ZX2 S/R, 143 hp (107 kW) and 146 lb⋅ft (198 N⋅m)
- 1999–2002 Mercury Cougar
- 2000–2004 Ford Focus Mk1, 128 hp (95 kW) and 135 lb⋅ft (183 N⋅m)
- 2001–2004 Ford Escape
- 2001–2004 Mazda Tribute
- 2002–2004 SVT Focus, 170 hp (127 kW) and 145 lb⋅ft (197 N⋅m)

=== Turbo ===
The European Ford Focus RS featured a turbocharged version of the 2.0 L Zeta unit producing 215 hp (160 kW) and 229 lb⋅ft (310 N⋅m) of torque, although it was badged as Duratec-RS.

== See also ==
- Ford Zetec engine
