= Denis Donkervoort =

Dutch racing driver

- Born: 13 January 1988 (age 38)
- Occupations: Chairman of Donkervoort (present) & CEO (2021-present)
- Parent: Joop Donkervoort

Denis Donkervoort (born January 13, 1988) is a Dutch racing driver and the son of Joop Donkervoort, the founder of Dutch sports car manufacturer Donkervoort.

In January 2021, Joop Donkervoort announced his resignation from the company, giving his son Denis ownership of the company as Chairman.
