= Donkervoort =

Manufacturer of hand-built, light weight sports cars

Donkervoort Automobielen B.V.
- Industry: Automotive
- Founded: 1 July 1978; 48 years ago
- Founder: Joop Donkervoort
- Headquarters: Lelystad, The Netherlands
- Area served: Europe; North America; Israel; United Arab Emirates
- Key people: Denis Donkervoort (Chairman and CEO),
- Products: Hand-built ultra-light weight sport cars
- Number of employees: 20–25
- Website: Donkervoort site – English homepage

Donkervoort Automobielen BV is a Dutch manufacturer of hand-built and ultra light weight sports cars based in Lelystad, Netherlands. The car brand was founded in 1978 by Joop Donkervoort. In 1996, Donkervoort's Ford engines were replaced by Audi engines. Donkervoort's motto – "No Compromise" – means driving without any electronic aids such as ABS (anti-lock braking system), electronic stability program (ESP) or power steering.

== Corporate history ==
Donkervoort is a privately held company controlled by founder Joop Donkervoort until he retired in 2019, and his son Denis succeeded him as Managing Director in 2021. Marianne Donkervoort, who is married to Joop, and Amber, their daughter, also have played key roles in developing the business and branding of the company. Amber was an equestrian who joined the company as the marketing manager following an internship in China. The Donkervoort S8A was named for Amber, while the D8 was named for Denis'.

Joop started the company as a kit car importer in 1978, but upon learning he needed to make significant modifications to make the assembled kit cars street legal, began building the first S7 automobiles using a design derived from the Lotus Seven in a Tienhoven shed. In 1983, Donkervoort moved to a larger production facility in Loosdrecht, followed by another move in 2000 to its present headquarters and factory in Lelystad. Chassis production, which previously had been contracted to an external supplier, was brought in-house to Lelystad in 2003.

=== Future plans ===
Donkervoort announced on their website that is expanding its worldwide locations and services, most recently being available as a car brand in the US.

== Automobiles ==
Model overview
Vehicle	Image	Year	Engine	Output
S7		1978–1984	1.6 L Ford OHV engine	90 hp (67 kW)
S8		1980–1984	2.0 L Ford OHC	103 hp (77 kW)
S8A		1985–1993	2.0 L Ford OHC	117 hp (87 kW)
S8AT		1986–1994	Turbocharged 2.0 L Ford OHC; Garrett T3 turbocharger with intercooler	170 hp (127 kW)
S8AT		1986–1994	Turbocharged 2.2 L Ford OHC; Garrett T3 turbocharger with intercooler	190 hp (142 kW)
D10		1988–1989	Turbocharged 2.2 L (2,160 cc) Ford OHC (Garrett T3)	190 hp (142 kW)
D8 Zetec		1993–1998	1.8 L 16V Zetec engine	140 hp (104 kW)
D8 Zetec		1993–1998	2.0 L 16V Zetec engine	160 hp (119 kW)
D8 Cosworth		1994–1998	Turbocharged 2.0 L DOHC Cosworth YB engine	220 to 280 hp (164 to 209 kW)
D8 Audi (AGU)		1999–2002	Turbocharged 1.8 L 20vT Audi engine	150 to 245 hp (112 to 183 kW)
D8 Audi (E-gas)		2003–2012	Turbocharged 1.8 L 20vT Audi engine	150 to 270 hp (112 to 201 kW)
D8 270 RS		2005–2007	Turbocharged 1.8 L 20vT Audi engine, drive by wire	270 hp (201 kW)
D8 270		2008–2012	Turbocharged 1.8 L 20vT Audi engine, drive by wire	270 hp (201 kW)
D8 GT		2007–2012	Turbocharged 1.8 L 20vT Audi engine, drive by wire	270 hp (201 kW)
D8 GTO		2013–2022	Turbocharged 2.5 L TFSI 5-cylinder Audi engine	250 to 280 kW (335 to 375 hp)
D8 GTO RS		2016–2022	Turbocharged 2.5 L TFSI 5-cylinder Audi engine	386 kW (518 hp)
D8 GTO 40		2018	Turbocharged 2.5 L TFSI 5-cylinder Audi engine	283 kW (380 hp)
D8 GTO JD-70		2019	Turbocharged TFSI 5-cylinder Audi engine	305 kW (409 hp)
D8 GTO JD-70 R		2020	Turbocharged TFSI 5-cylinder Audi engine	310 kW (416 hp)
D8 GTO Individual Series		2021–present	Turbocharged TFSI 5-cylinder Audi engine	325 kW (436 hp)
F22		2022–2025	Turbocharged TFSI 5-cylinder Audi engine	367 kW (492 hp)
P24 RS		2026–present	Twin-turbocharged 3.5 L Ford EcoBoost D35 V6 engine	441 kW (591 hp)

=== Current models ===
==== Donkervoort P24 RS (2026–present) ====
First teased in 14 March 2025, the P24 RS was introduced in 24 January 2026, serving as the successor to the F22. It was the first model to be powered by a Ford engine since the D8 Zetec and D8 Cosworth ended production in 1998, after having been powered by Audi engines since starting production with the D8 Audi in 1999 until 2025, when the F22 ended production.

The P24 RS is powered by a 3.5-litre twin-turbocharged Ford EcoBoost D35 V6 engine from the Ford GT, producing 441 kW (591 hp) and 800 N⋅m (590 lb⋅ft) while weighing in at 780 kg (1,720 lb), which creates a power-to-weight ratio of 570 kW (760 hp), than. It is equipped with a 5-speed manual transmission with a Torsen limited-slip differential, and powers the rear wheels. Though the 0–100 km/h (0–62 mph) time is described by the manufacturer as "appropriate", therefore making it undefined, the car will go from 0–200 km/h (0–124 mph) in 7.4 seconds, reach a top speed of more than 300 km/h (186 mph), and have a lateral acceleration of 2.3 G. The car can be optioned with power steering, anti-lock braking system (ABS), AP Racing carbon ceramic brake calipers (saves 2.1 kg (5 lb) per corner), and a removable aero kit, which adds 90 kg (198 lb) of downforce. Production is only limited to 150 units.

=== Previous models ===
==== Donkervoort S7/S8 ====
===== S7 =====
The first Donkervoort – the S7 – was introduced in 1978. It is an ultra-light weight sports car manufactured in Tienhoven between 1978 and 1982. It was replaced by the Donkervoort S8 in late 1983. These cars have a Ford Crossflow 1.6 liter OHV engine with 90 PS (66 kW) and a four-speed manual transmission, or a 2.0 liter Ford OHC engine with 110 hp (82 kW). Mechanically, the car used a Triumph front axle and an Escort rear axle. Top speed was 170 km/h (106 mph).

===== S8/S8A =====
Introduced in late 1983, the S8 and later S8A were the first Donkervoorts of notice, with the "Eight" implying an improvement over the Lotus Seven. Of exactly the same dimensions as the Donkervoort Super Seven, these cars originally used a two-liter inline-four engine from Ford of Europe. In 1985, the S8 was upgraded with a five-speed gearbox, a Donkervoort front axle, and a rear axle from the Ford Capri. The S8A also was introduced that year with a wider front track and an independent rear suspension, distinguished by refreshed styling and new adhesive-based manufacturing. Production of the S8 ended in 1989, and the S8A was discontinued in 1993.

===== S8AT =====
Responding to the need for more power, a turbocharged version of the S8A was introduced in 1986; this car is identifiable by a profusion of various vents and openings to cool the engine. Power output rose to 170 hp (127 kW). The S8AT was improved in 1988, receiving the chassis and larger engine from the D10 until it was discontinued in 1994.

==== Donkervoort D8 ====
===== D8 Zetec (1993–1998) =====
From 1993 the new D8 was built, marking the continuing departure from being merely a Super Seven copy. The first D8s were the last Donkervoorts to receive Ford engines; 1.8 and 2.0-liter versions from the Zetec family. Donkervoort offered a "Sport" version that changed to cycle-style front fenders and reduced weight through the use of carbon fibre body parts.

===== D8 Cosworth (1995–1998) =====
The D8 also was fitted with the 2.0-liter turbocharged Cosworth YB engine starting in 1995.

===== D8 Audi (1999–2008) =====
During 1999, Donkervoort switched from Ford to Audi's 20-valve turbocharged 1.8-liter R4 engine, available in a variety of outputs ranging from 150 to 245 PS (110 to 180 kW).

===== D8 Audi (E-gas) Wide Track (2003–2012) =====
Since 2003, the Donkervoort is equipped with the Audi 1.8T 20V E-gas (electronic throttle) turbocharged engine. In the D8, the engine is available with 150 bhp, 180 bhp, 210 bhp and 270 bhp. Thanks to its total weight of 630 kg (1,389 lb), this results in an acceleration time from 0 to 100 km/h (0 to 62 mph) between 3.8 and 5.2 seconds depending on the type. The Wide Track models can be distinguished from earlier Audi-powered models by the front light arrangement.

===== D8 270 (2008–2012) =====
The Donkervoort D8 270 is available since the summer of 2008. This version of the D8 series became the successor of the D8 270 RS, the limited edition that was introduced in 2005 and restricted to 25 numbered units. The D8 270 has a restyled nose and grill that refer directly to the D8 GT and accelerates from 0–100 km/h (62 mph) in 3.6 seconds.

This car was the seventh fastest production car on Nürburgring's famous Nordschleife of 2011, at 7m 14.9s.

===== D8 GT (2007–2012) =====
The Donkervoort D8 GT - introduced in 2007 - is the first closed Donkervoort. Compared to the open version of the D8, the D8 GT has entirely new front and rear suspension, increased track width by 8 centimeters, larger brakes for increased stopping power and 17-inch aluminum wheels. With a total weight of 650 kg (1,433 lb), the D8GT is the lightest GT in the world. This is largely due to the extensive use of carbon fiber: the entire roof, the entire rear and the doors and fenders of the car are made of this material.

==== Donkervoort D8 GTO ====
===== D8 GTO (2013–2022) =====
The Donkervoort D8 GTO is a completely new creation. The engine, a 2.5L TFSI 5-cylinder turbocharged Audi engine, has a power output of 250-280 kW (340-380PS/335-375 bhp) and 450 N⋅m (332 lb⋅ft) of torque at 1600 rpm, and the whole car weighs less than 700 kg. This low weight is due to composite materials such as the full carbon fibre body of the D8 GTO. With a power-to-weight ratio of 1.8 kg/PS, the car can accelerate from 0–100 km/h (62 mph) in 2.8 seconds and from 0–200 km/h (124 mph) in 8.6 seconds.

The very first GTOs were produced in a limited series of 25 Premium D8 GTOs in 2013. The production of the regular D8 GTO, available in a Touring or a Performance version, started in 2014.

===== D8 GTO RS (2016–2022) =====
Donkervoort introduced the D8 GTO RS in October 2016 as the successor to their D8 270 RS. Donkervoort states that they have reduced the D8 GTO's drag coefficient by 20 percent. The GTO RS offers a new suspension system as an additional option, and also offers a dual-clutch automatic transmission setup. It is not street legal.

===== D8 GTO Individual series (2021) =====
In July 2021 Donkervoort announced on their website that they were launching a newer vehicle, and their motto was "Any company can sell their cars. Only Donkervoort can create your car - The choice is yours". The model D8 GTO Individual series was launched on 9 September 2021 and was the first Donkervoort model available in purple color.

==== Donkervoort F22 (2022–2025) ====
Donkervoort announced in October 2022 on their website that they had ended the production of D8 series and are planning to produce a new model, the Donkervoort F22. It will be less than 800 kg and will have similar features to the previous models. Further details were provided in a November press release announcing the F22 will be launched on December 10, 2022. Donkervoort stated the F22 would be faster, larger, more rigid, and more efficient than the D8 GTO. Initial reports, which stated the F22 would weigh less than 1,000 kg (2,200 lb) and boldly advertised "it will be worth the weight", caused speculation the F22 would be considerably heavier than the D8 GTO; Donkervoort later clarified the target weight was "considerably less than" 800 kg (1,800 lb).

As announced in December 2022, the F22 was a limited-production model with 75 examples produced; of these, 50 were sold already. The vehicle is 4,039 mm (159.0 in) long and the chassis uses steel tubes and the company's "Ex-Core" carbon fibre sandwich technology, bringing the total weight of the vehicle to 750 kg (1,653 lb). The drivetrain uses a five-cylinder engine from Audi that develops 492 hp (367 kW) / 640 N⋅m (472 lb⋅ft) and drives the rear wheels through a five-speed manual transmission. Donkervoort touted it as having improved "practicality, comfort, and ease of use", featuring the car's 298 L (10.5 ft^{3}) trunk. It is named for Filippa, the daughter of managing director Denis Donkervoort, born in 2022.

=== Limited editions and prototypes ===
==== Donkervoort D10 (1988) ====
This sleek, minimalist version was built in a very limited series of ten to celebrate Donkervoort's tenth anniversary in 1988. The cars lacked a spare wheel as well as a windshield, but benefitted from an enlarged (2,160 cc) version of the Ford engine with a bigger Garrett T3 turbocharger, producing 190 PS (140 kW). The last car was only built in 1994, with some of the later examples receiving Cosworth engines with up to 300 PS (221 kW).

==== Donkervoort D20 (1998) ====
Intended as the 20th anniversary special, the D20 was developed in conjunction with Audi under the sponsorship of CEO Dr. Franz-Josef Paefgen. Until the D20, all Donkervoorts had the engine and gearbox in the front, but the D20 had the engine in the front and the gearbox in the rear as a transaxle. The D20 was the first Donkervoort with a V6 engine, which was actually intended for larger, more comfortable Audi cars. The engine was modified to produce 280 hp (210 kW). The D20 was built as a prototype, but never went into production, as it was unable to meet emissions standards with the larger engine.

==== Donkervoort J25 (2003) ====
Intended as the 25th anniversary special, the J25 used the nose and doors from the D20 with modernized styling and was the first Donkervoort to develop 270 hp (200 kW). A prototype was built but it never entered regular production.

==== Donkervoort D8 270 RS (2005) ====
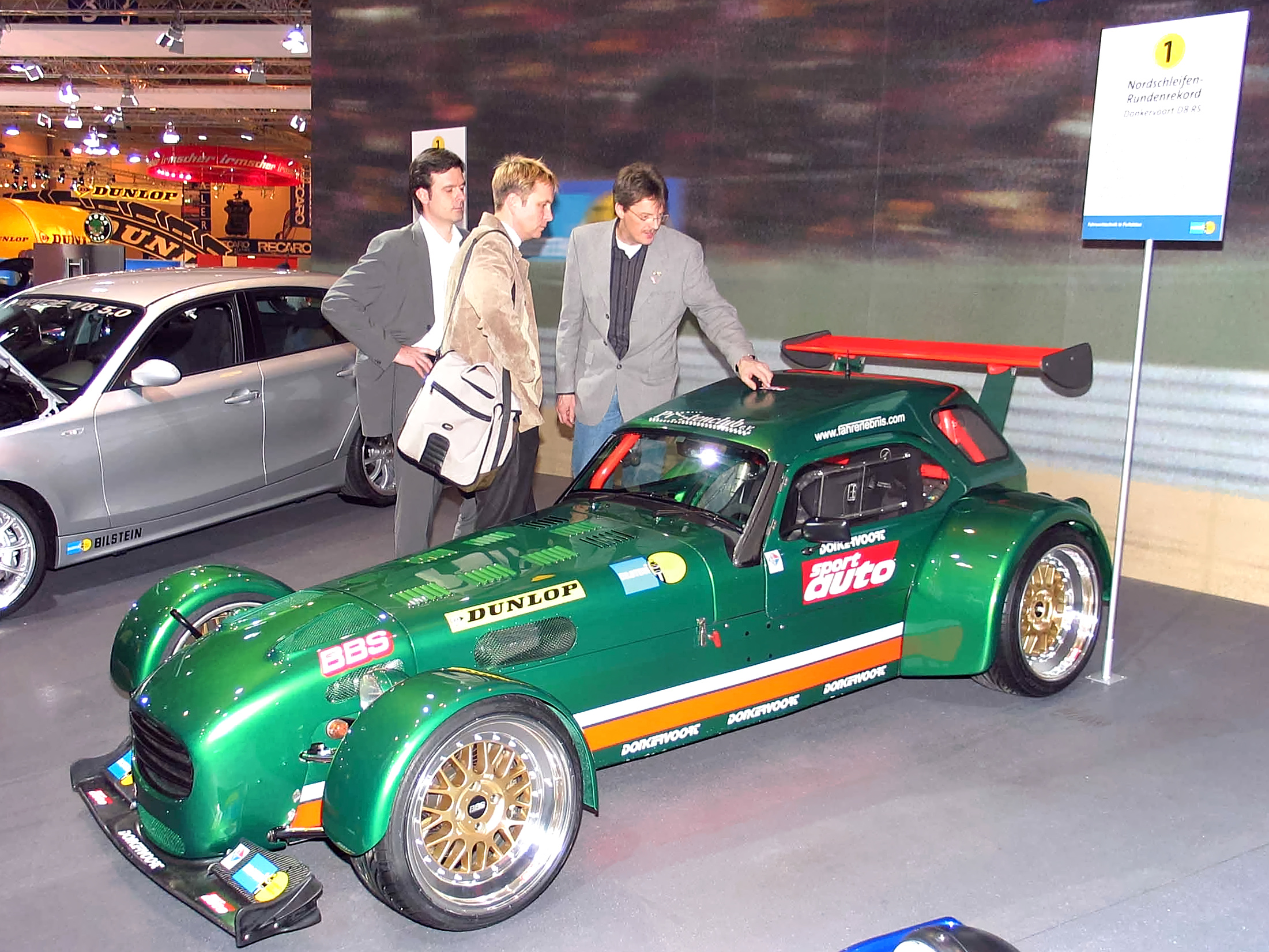
D8 RS used to set the Nordschleife record

The D8 270 RS was built in a limited edition of 25 examples to celebrate the prototype RS that was used to set the production car lap record at the Nurburgring Nordschleife.

==== Donkervoort D8 GTO Premium (2013) ====
The Premium D8 GTOs were the first GTOs to be produced. After a sneak preview event introducing the D8 GTO in December 2012, existing customers were able to obtain one of these full option GTOs. The Premium D8 GTO was built as a limited series of 25 cars and had a little more power (380+ BHP) than, e.g., the D8 GTO Performance.

==== Donkervoort D8 GTO Bilster Berg Edition (2014–2015) ====
In September 2014, the Donkervoort D8 GTO broke the lap record at the German Bilster Berg Drive Resort. The 380 hp Performance version set the new record for street-legal production cars at 1 minute 46.12 seconds. To celebrate this milestone – along with the opening of a Donkervoort subsidiary at that same location that year—Donkervoort introduced the Bilster Berg Edition, which was based on the record-breaking test car and built in a limited series of 14 cars, a number that represented the successful year 2014. Technical developments included the further development and fine-tuning in the areas of chassis and road-handling. Furthermore, this edition is easily recognisable by its dark nose section, made entirely of carbon fibre.

==== Donkervoort D8 GTO-40 (2018) ====
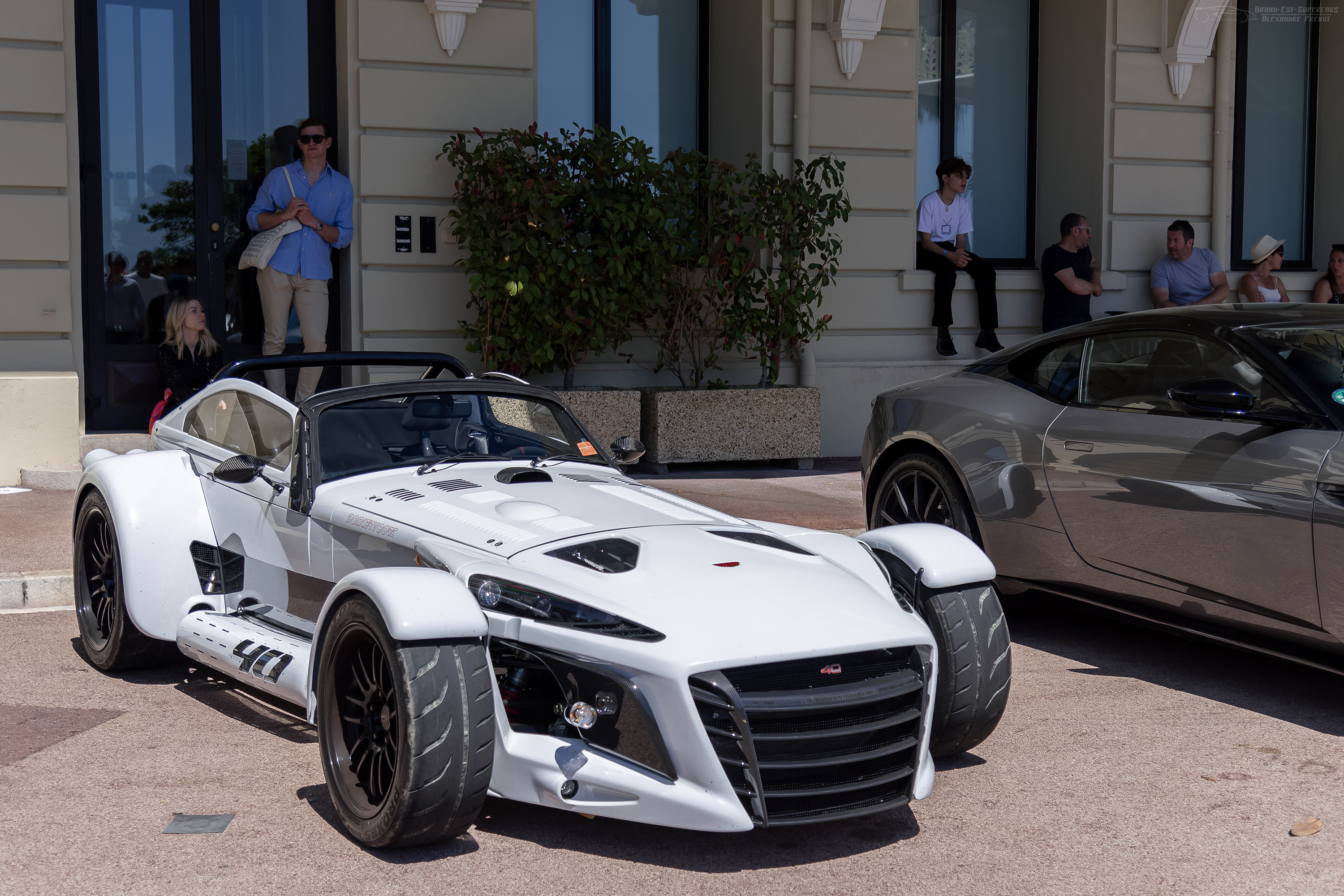
Donkervoort D8 GTO-40

For the firm's 40th anniversary, the GTO-40 was released as a limited edition of 40. Weight has been reduced by 22 kg (49 lb) compared to the conventional GTO through the use of carbon fibre sandwich panels (branded and patented by Donkervoort as EX-CORE) and an optimized steel tubular chassis.

==== Donkervoort D8 GTO JD-70 (2019) ====
For the founder's 70th birthday, Joop Donkervoort a special edition called Donkervoort D8 GTO JD-70 was produced, again making use of Donkervoort's EX-CORE technology. In total, there were 70 produced, including the Bare Naked Carbon Edition and JD70 R sub-variants. The Bare Naked Carbon Edition highlighted the extensive use of carbon fibre body panels by changing the painted finish to a clear coat, and was offered in four levels corresponding to the degree of paint reduction, ranging from "Exposed Carbon" (matte or gloss clear coats over the side panels, engine-bay wings, bonnet scoop, triangular cover scoops, and interior) to "Full-Exposed Coloured Carbon" (tinted clear coat finish over all carbon fibre parts). The JD70 R is a track-tuned edition with racing-specific improvements, and Donkervoort includes driver coaching and data analysis services with the purchase of the car.

==== Donkervoort F22 Art Edition (2024) ====
The F22 Art Edition was created for the brand's ambassador and the car's owner Cees Lubbers. The design was created by Dutch artist and winner of the 2006 Royal Dutch Award for painting Anneke Wilbrink, however the representation of the artwork wasn't told by the creator. It is currently on display at the owner's gallery.
