= Ford Fairlane (Australia) =

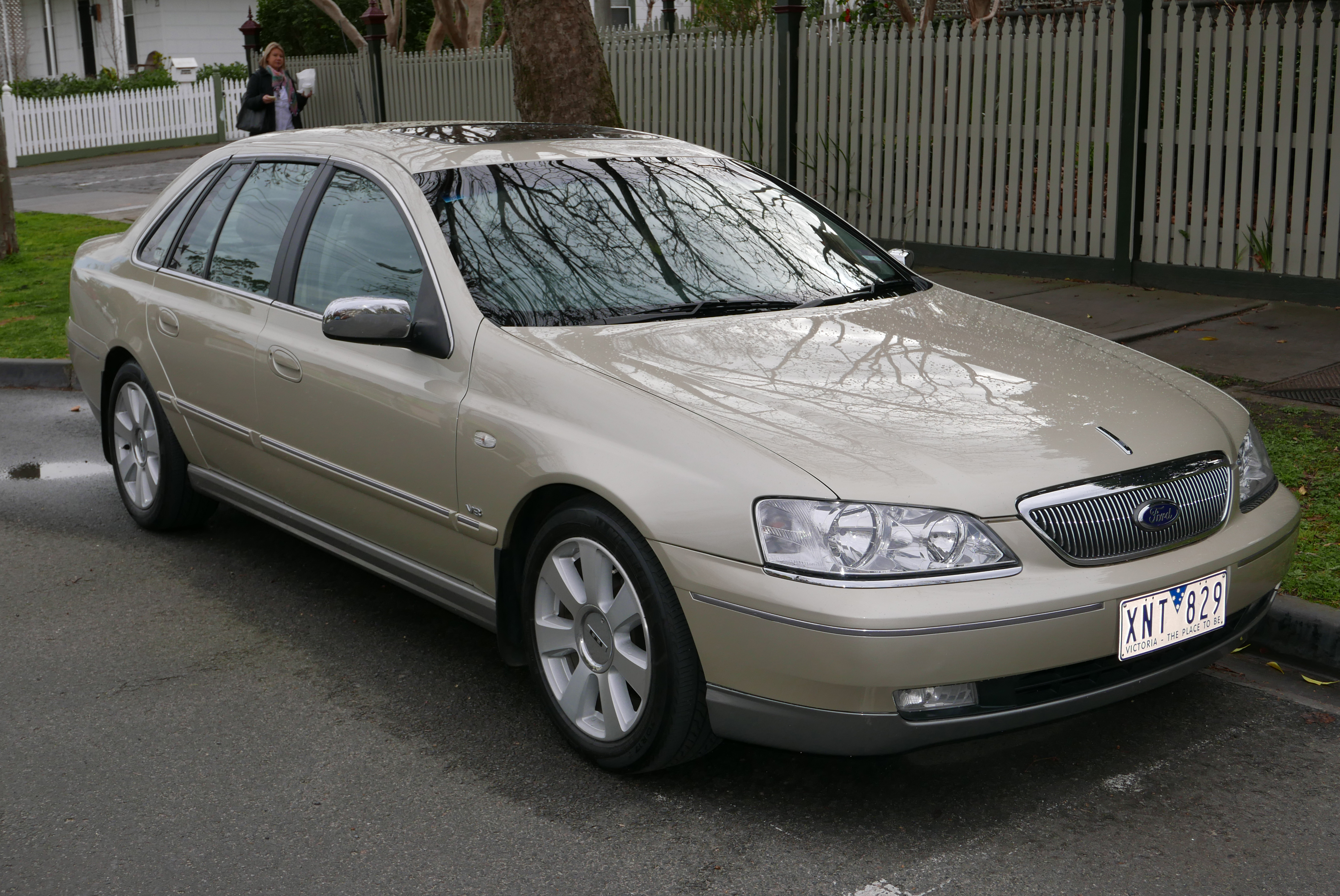

Overview
- Manufacturer: Ford Australia
- Also called: Ford LTD
- Production: 1959–2007
- Assembly: Broadmeadows; Eagle Farm

Body and chassis
- Class: Full-size luxury car
- Body style: 4-door sedan
- Related: Ford Falcon (Australia)

The Ford Fairlane and LTD are full-sized luxury vehicles produced in a series of models by Ford Australia between 1959 (with the LTD commencing production in 1973) and 2007.

From 1959 to 1964, the Fairlane was a locally assembled version of the American Ford Fairlane, which had taken its name from Henry Ford's estate, Fair Lane, near Dearborn, Michigan. The car was Ford Australia's top-of-the-range model until replaced by an Australian-assembled version of the full-sized American Ford Galaxie. In 1967, Ford Australia reintroduced the Fairlane, this time as an Australian-developed, luxury, long-wheelbase version of its mainstream Falcon/Fairmont, positioned between the Falcon and the Galaxie. The locally assembled Galaxie evolved into the LTD which was itself replaced in 1973 by an Australian-developed, Fairlane-based model, also known as the Ford LTD. Unlike its designation in Australia, in North America the LTD was not considered a luxury vehicle. In Australia, "LTD" originally stood for "Lincoln Type Design", although Ford Australia later promoted a connection with the meaning "Limited".

The Fairlane and LTD competed in the marketplace with the Holden Brougham (1968–1971), the Statesman (1971–1984), and later with the Holden Statesman and Caprice (1990–2007).

Ford produced the Fairlane/LTD at the Broadmeadows Assembly Plant and Eagle Farm, Queensland, in the early years. Until around March/April 1978 with the upcoming release of the XD Falcon and its derivatives, Ford consolidated Falcon production at Campbellfield and Fairlane/LTD manufacturing to Eagle Farm. Around the release of the next generation during the EA Falcon era (1988), Eagle Farm ceased manufacture of cars and only produced heavy trucks until its closure in 1998.

== Australian-assembled US Fairlanes ==
=== Full-size Fairlane (1959–1962) ===
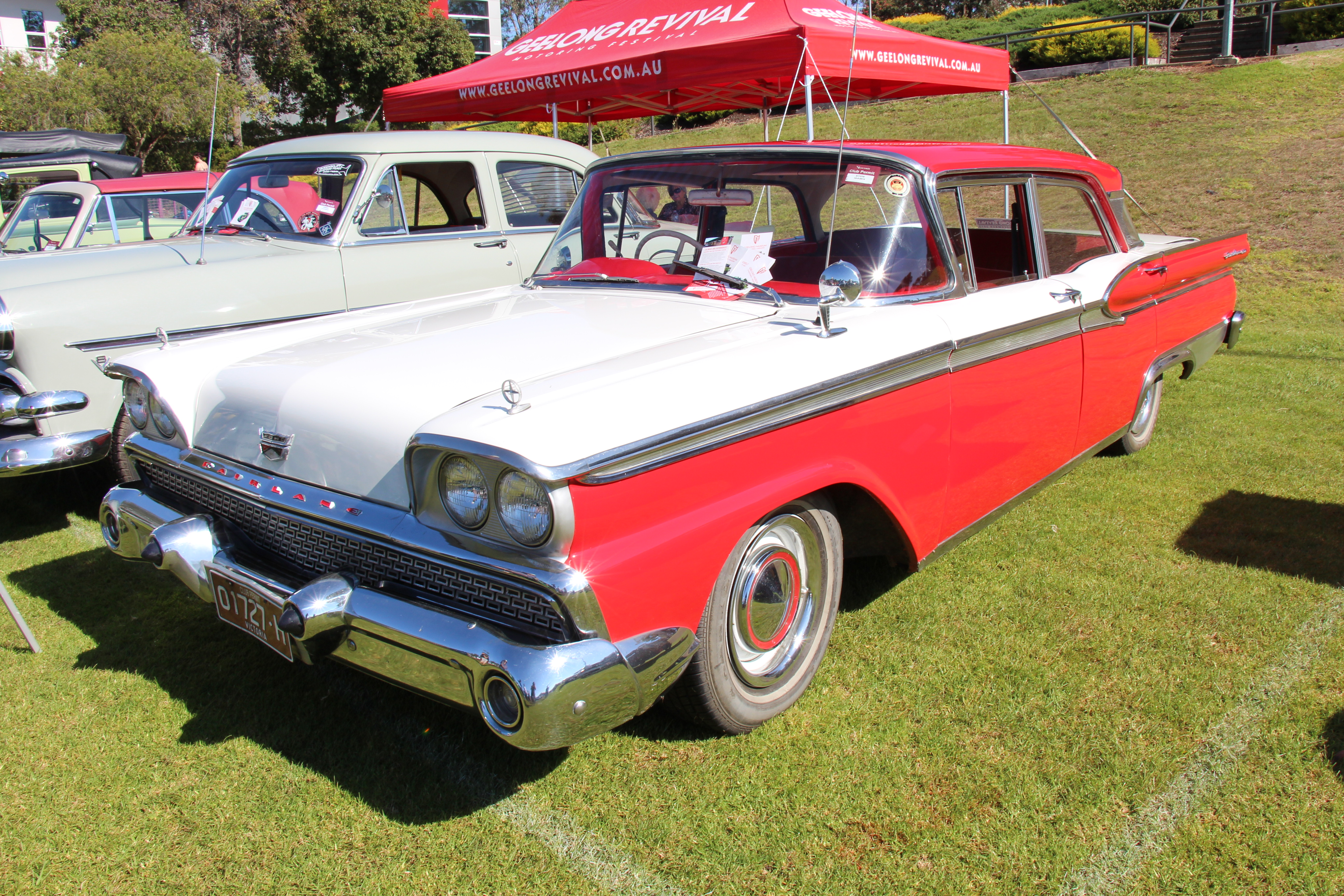
1960–1961 Ford Fairlane 500 sedan (facelift)

In September 1959, Ford Australia released three new locally-assembled models, the Fairlane 500, the lower specification Custom 300, and the Ranch Wagon. They were sourced from Ford of Canada, but were essentially the same as their 1959 US Ford counterparts. Tooling for local manufacture had taken nearly two years and had been completed at a cost of almost £1.5 million Australian.

The sedans were 9½ inches longer and 5 inches lower than the Ford Customline models which they replaced and all three models featured a 204 bhp (152 kW)332-cubic-inch (5.44 L) V8 engine. The Custom 300 and Ranch Wagon was fitted with a three-speed manual transmission as standard equipment and the Fairlane 500 used a fully automatic transmission. Wheelbase was 118".

For 1960, the range was updated with the grille and trim from the 1959 Canadian Meteor and engine power was increased to 220 bhp (164 kW).

=== Intermediate Fairlanes (1962–1965) ===
==== FB (1962) ====
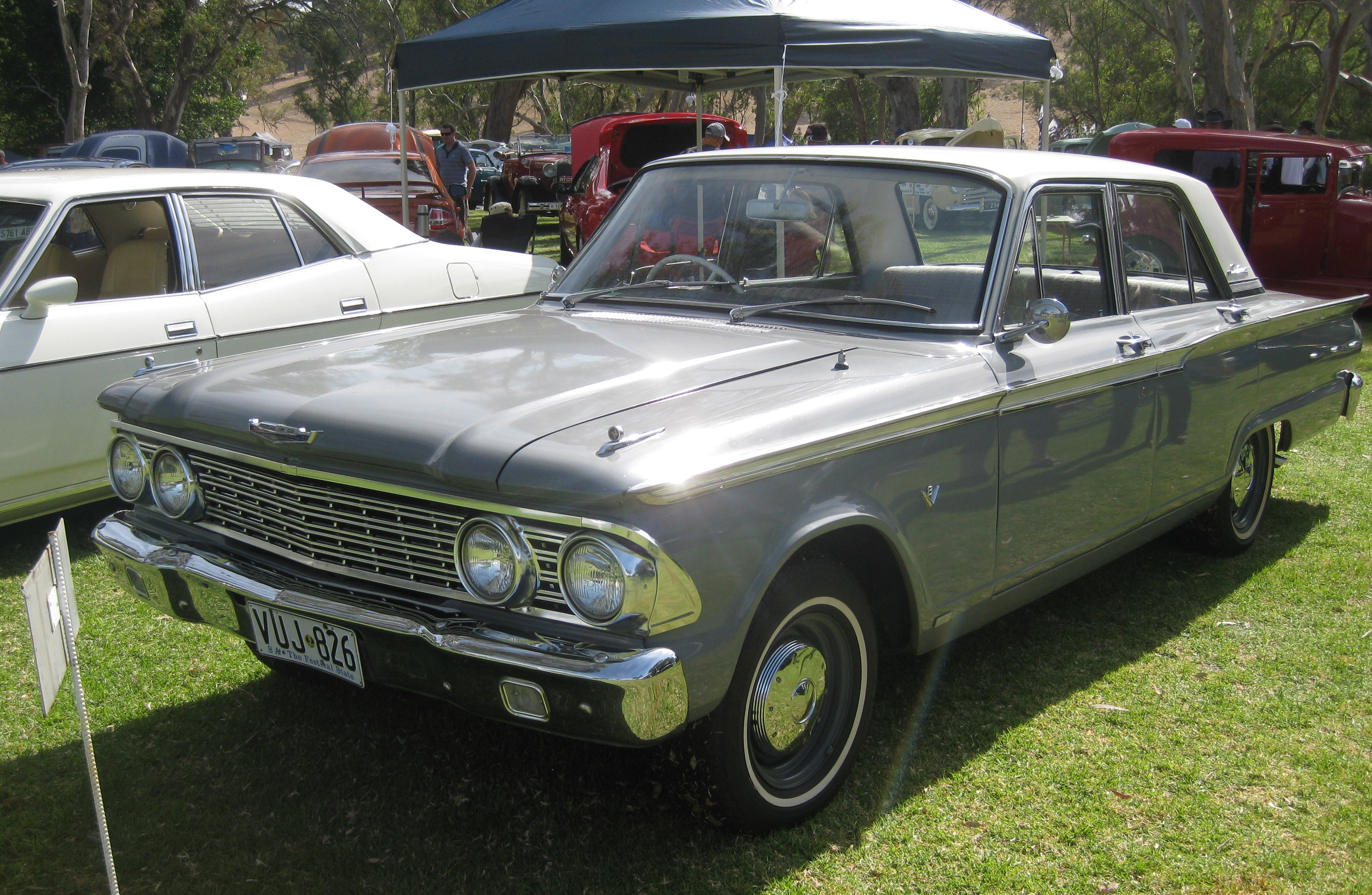
Ford Fairlane (FB) 500

In May 1962, the smaller 1962 US Fairlane 500 sedan was introduced as the FB model and a 221-cubic-inch (3.62 L) Windsor V8 was fitted in lieu of the 332. Although classified as an intermediate-sized car in the United States, the new model was referred to in Australia as the "compact" Fairlane. The new model, which was assembled in Ford Australia's Homebush plant in Sydney, New South Wales, was £200 cheaper than its predecessor at £2,000; 1,632 examples were produced.

==== FC (1963) ====
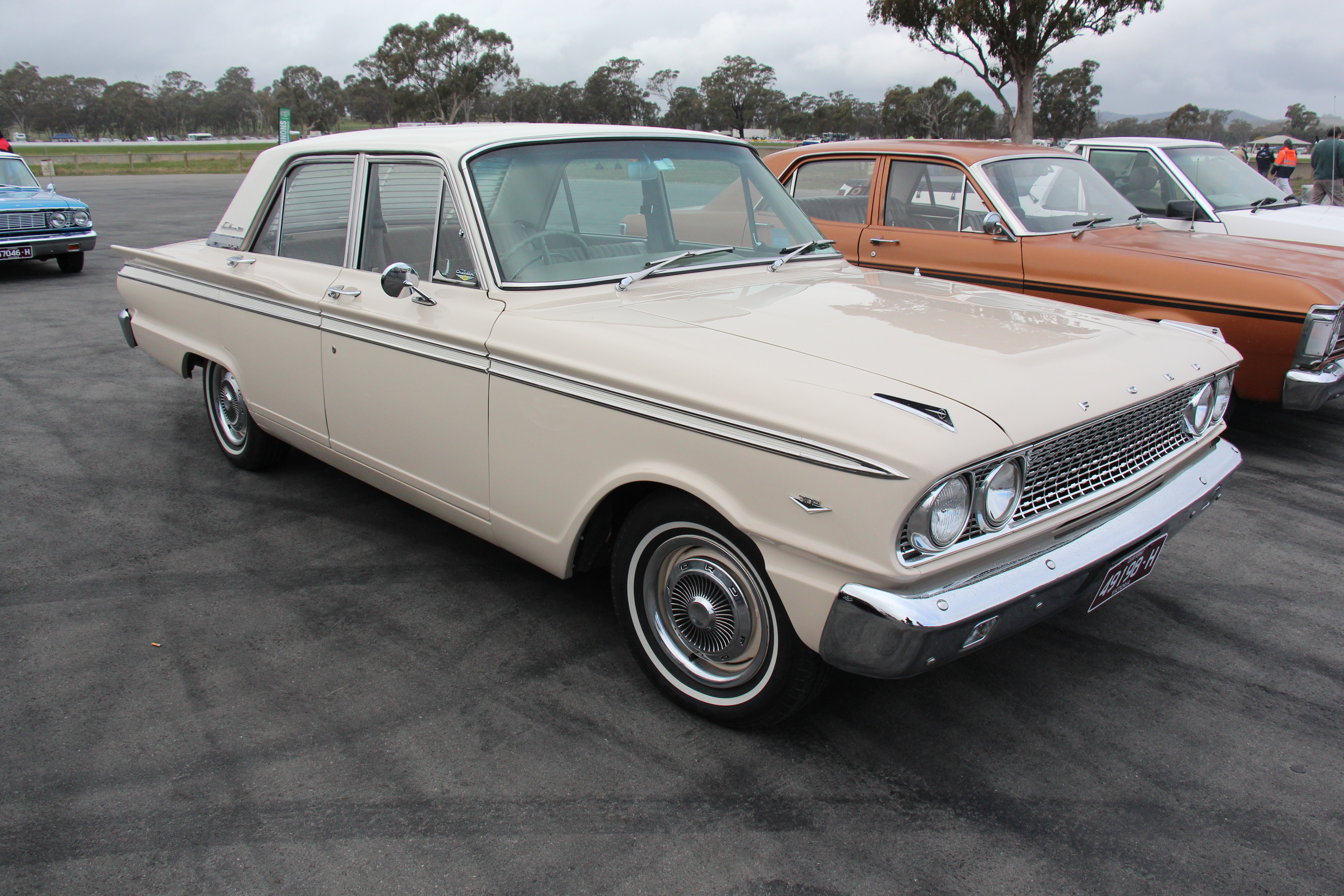
Ford Fairlane (FC) 500

Assembly of the 1963 US Fairlane 500 sedan as the FC model was commenced by Ford Australia in November 1962. It featured a revised bonnet, front guards, grille, headlights, and taillights, and was fitted with the "Ford-O-Matic" automatic transmission as standard equipment, and a 260-cubic-inch (4.3 L) Windsor V8 engine was now offered as an option. The Australian production of the 1963 model totalled 1,771 units.

==== FD (1964) ====
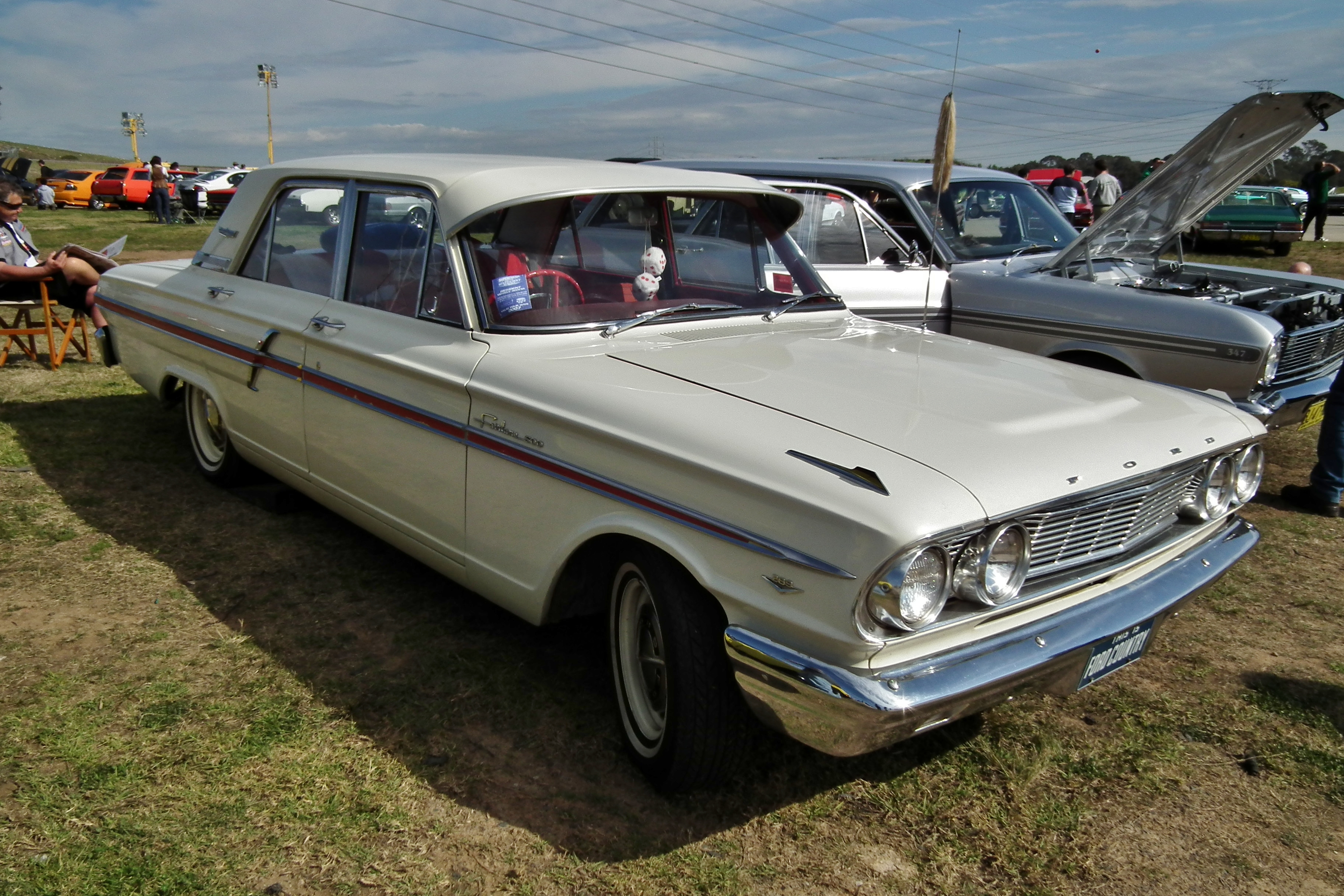
Ford Fairlane (FD) 500

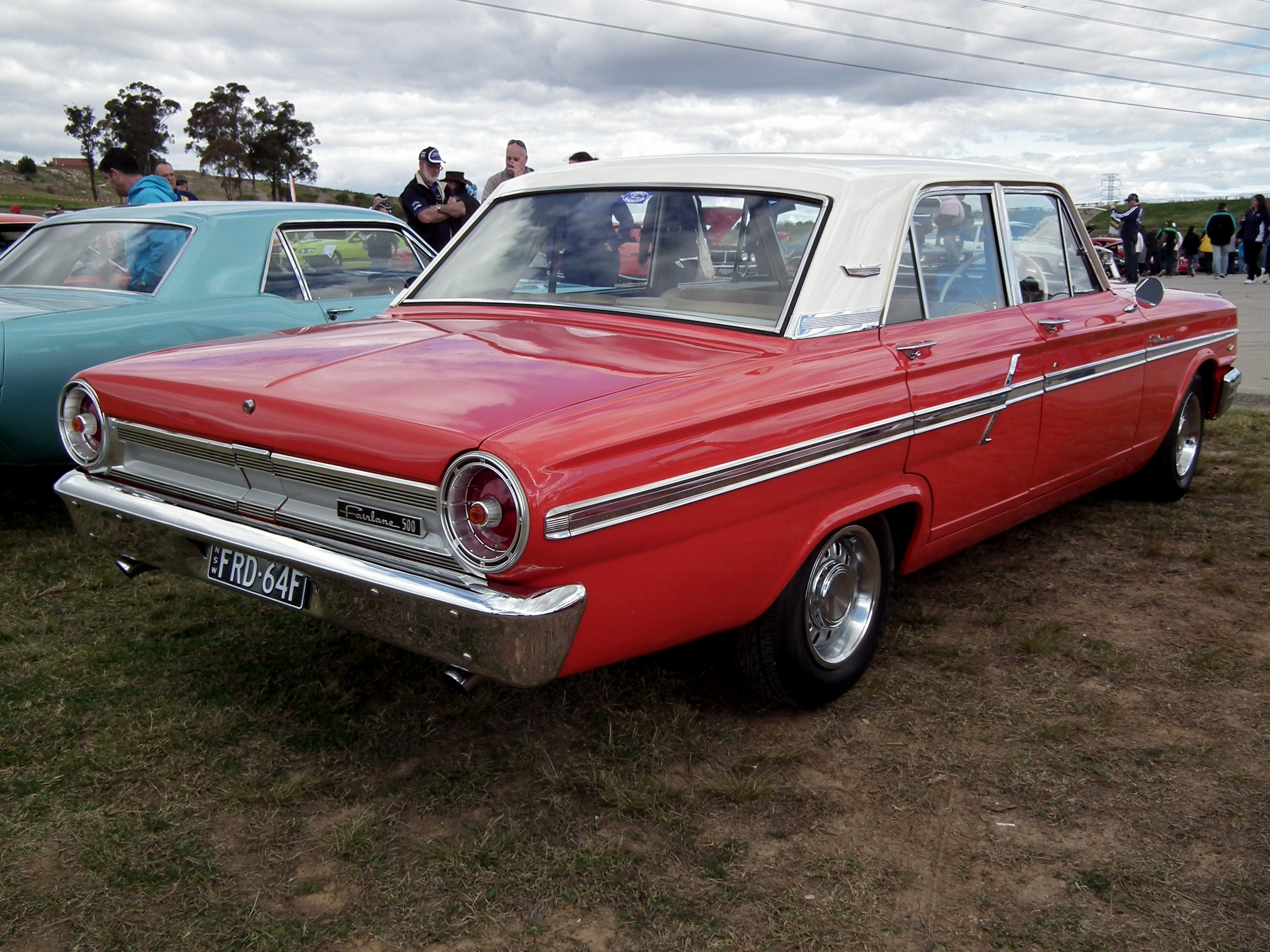
Ford Fairlane (FD) 500

The 1964 US Fairlane 500 sedan was assembled by Ford Australia from December 1963 as the FD model. It was introduced in April 1964, distinguished by a lack of tail fins and a new grille with seven vertical bars. A choice of two powertrains was offered in the new model, a 260-cubic-inch (4.3 L) Windsor V8 with Ford-O-Matic automatic transmission or a 289-cubic-inch (4.74 L) Windsor V8 with Cruise-O-Matic automatic transmission. The 1964 model was the last of the US Fairlanes in Australia, as Ford discontinued the model locally in 1965 to make way for the larger Ford Galaxie; 1,344 examples were produced in Australia.

== Australian Fairlanes ==
=== First generation ===
==== ZA (1967–1968) ====
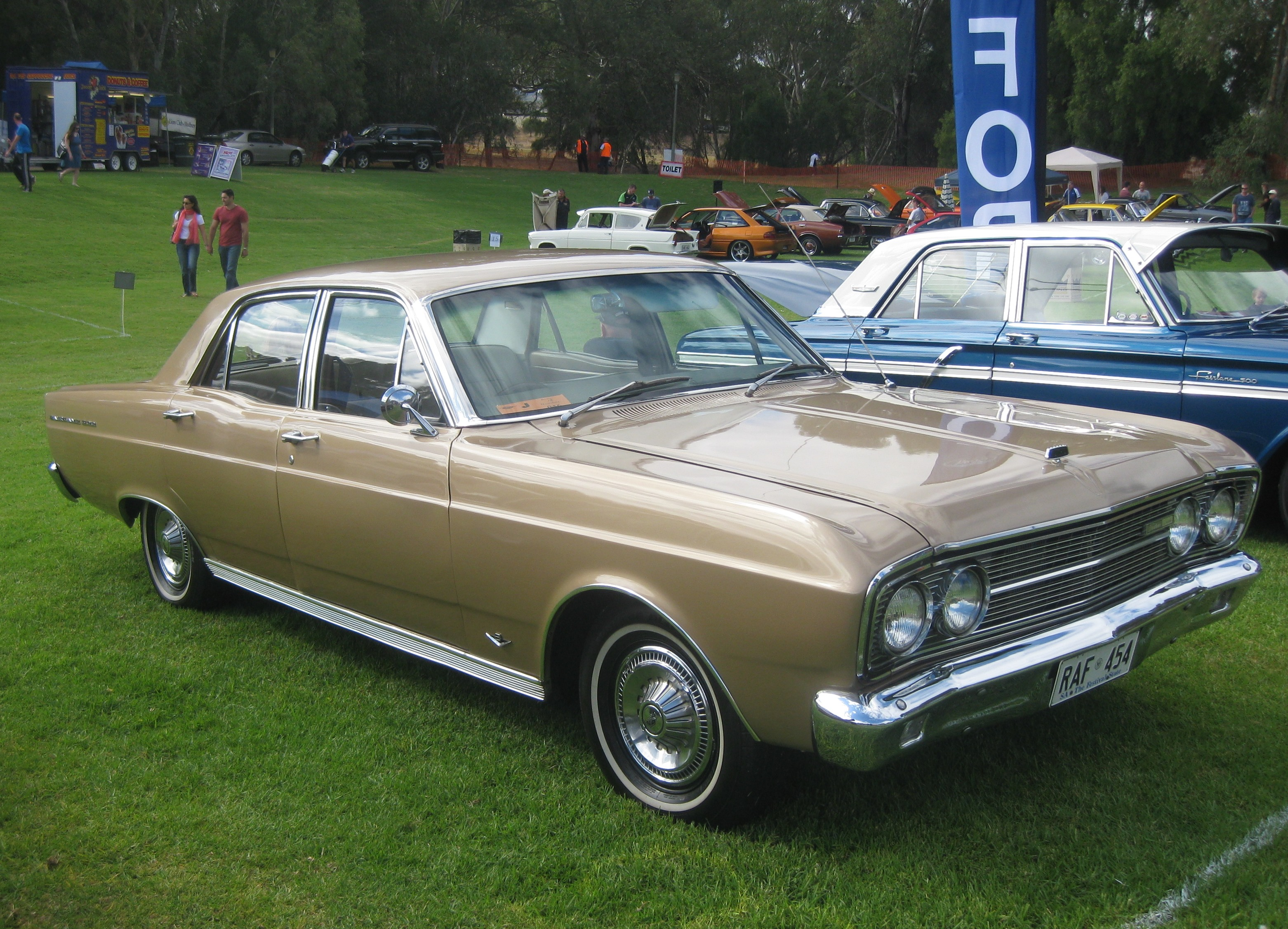
Ford Fairlane (ZA) 500

The ZA Fairlane series, introduced in March 1967, was designed and built in Australia, although its front-end styling resembled the American Ford Falcon sedan of that year (except for the quad headlights). The body shape was similar to the 1966–67 US Fairlane sedan, however. Offered as the Fairlane and the Fairlane 500, it was based on the Australian XR Falcon. The 2819 mm wheelbase of the Falcon was stretched to 2946 mm, the front and centre body sections were retained and a new twin-headlight grille was added. The rear quarter panels and boot from the US Fairlane were used, and square taillights (sourced from the 1966 USA Fairlane) replaced the round units used on the Falcon.

The Fairlane was equipped with a 200-cubic-inch (3.3 L) six-cylinder engine as standard with a 289-cubic-inch (4.74 L) V8 as an option. The Fairlane 500 featured the 289-cubic-inch (4.74 L) V8 as standard equipment. The six-cylinder engine was available with manual or automatic transmission and the V8 only with an automatic. Production of the ZA Fairlane totalled 8,814 vehicles.

==== ZB (1968–1969) ====
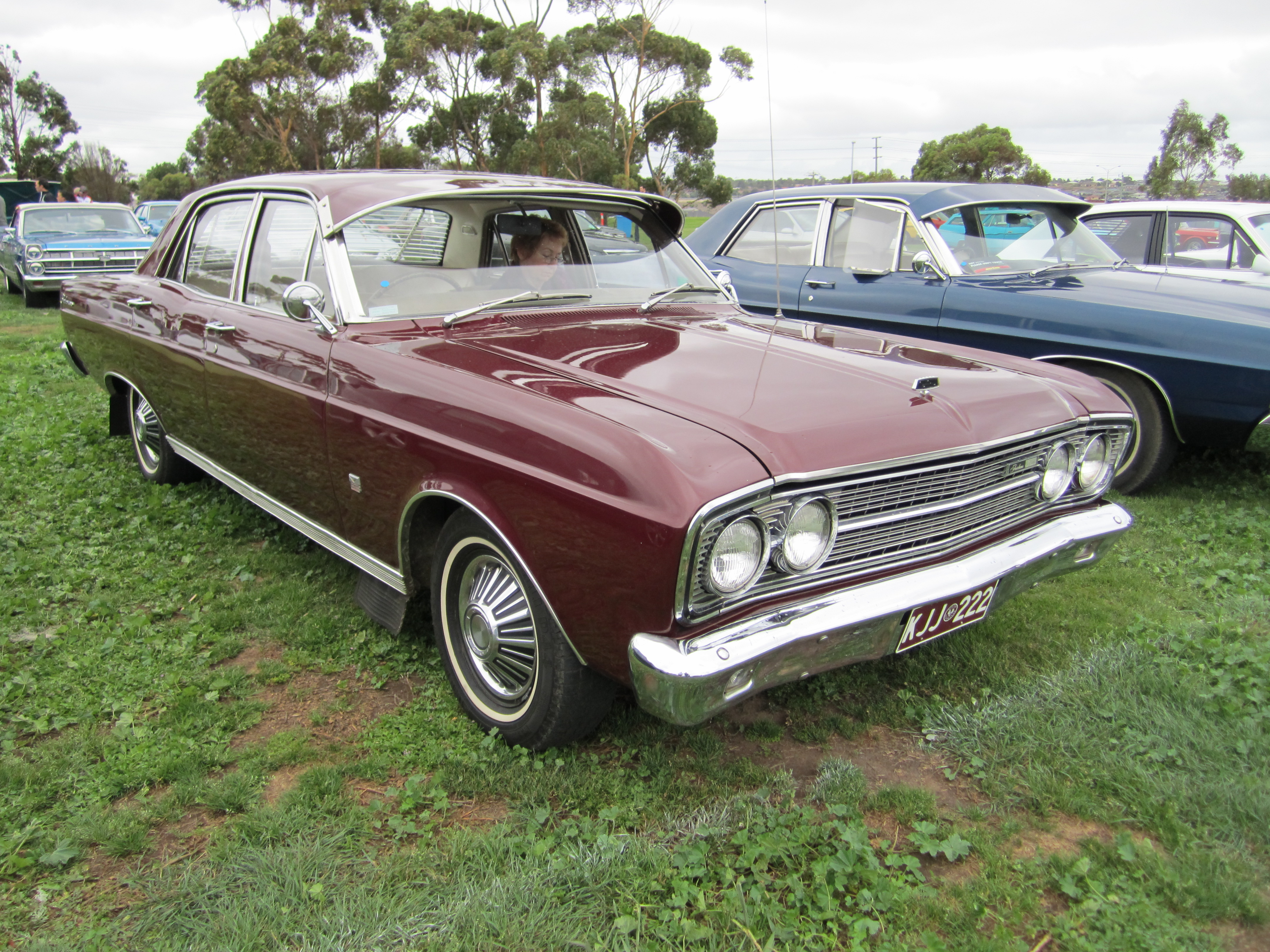
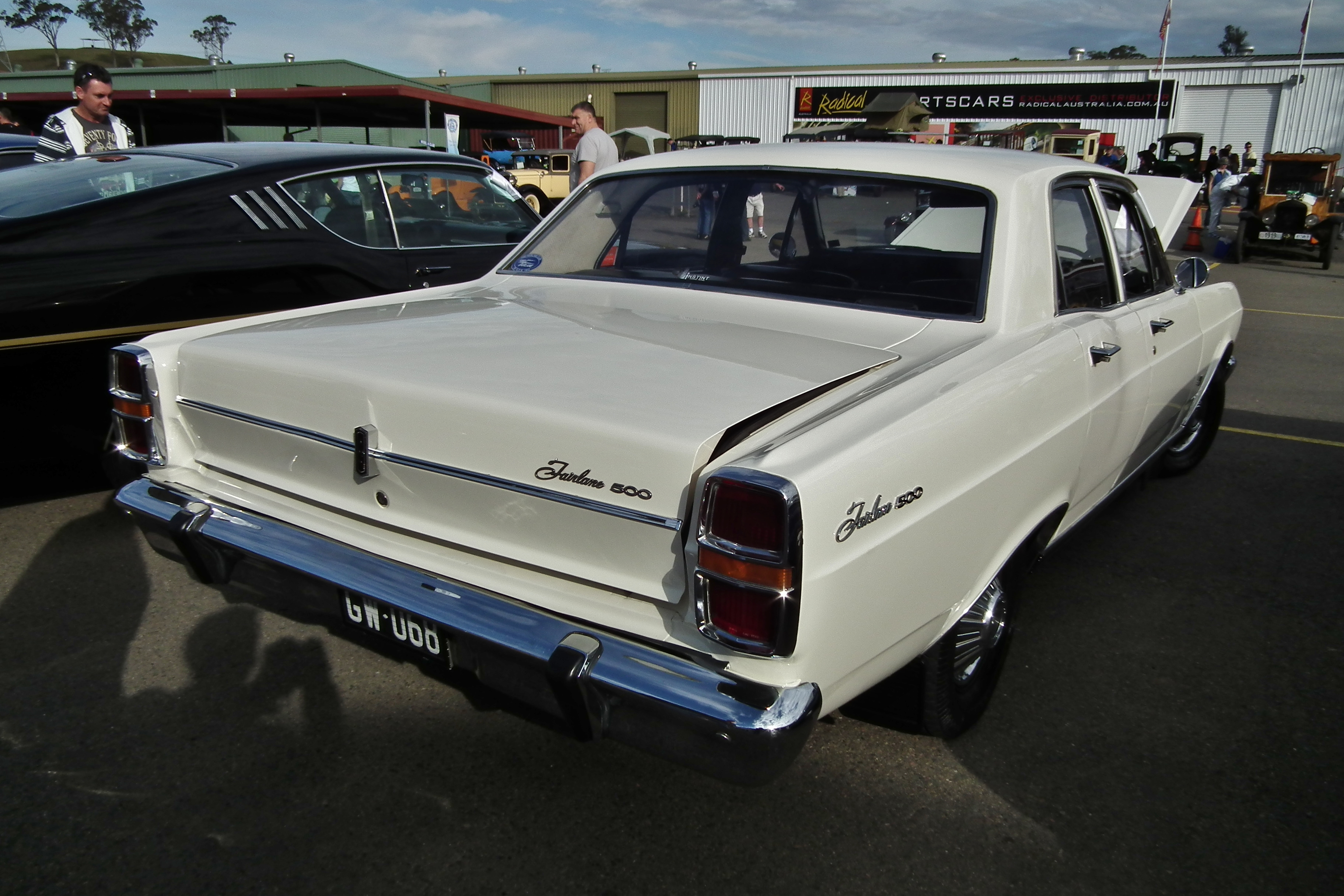
Ford Fairlane (ZB) 500

A model change to the ZB series in March 1968 had the 200 grow to 221-cubic-inch (3.62 L) and the 289 grow to 302-cubic-inch (4.95 L), the top model remaining the Fairlane 500 with the larger engine. The Fairlane name badge on the rear guards was now in script rather than capitals as it had been on the ZA. The only notable external change was the taillight design (sourced from the 1967 USA market Fairlane), again following the general look of the Falcon (in this case the XT). The base model was now known as Fairlane Custom.

Year	Engines	HP	Transmission	Wheelbase	length
1968	3.6L six-cylinder;302CID V-8	210(V8)	Cruise-O-Matic	116"	196.1"

==== ZC (1969–1970) ====
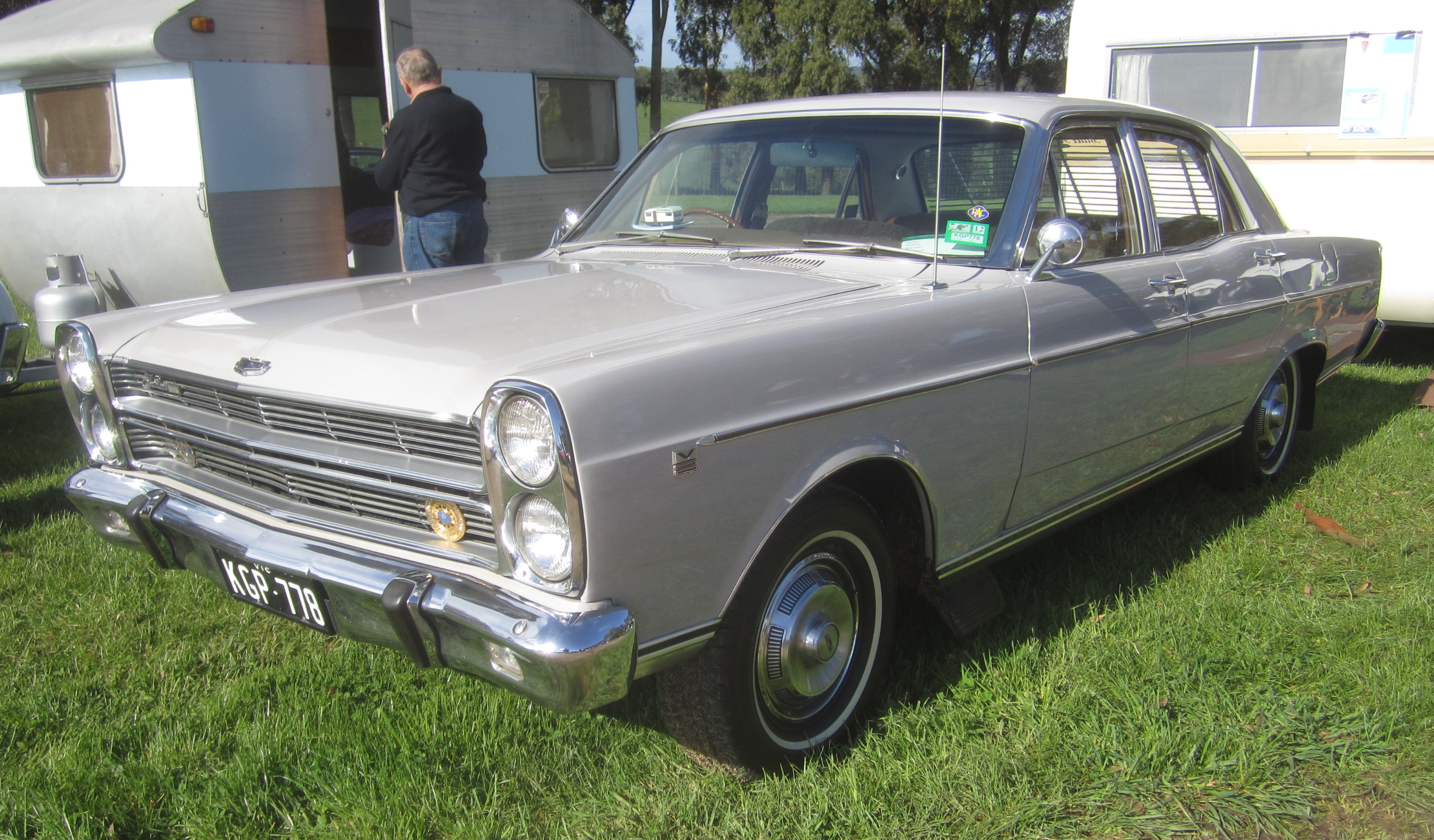
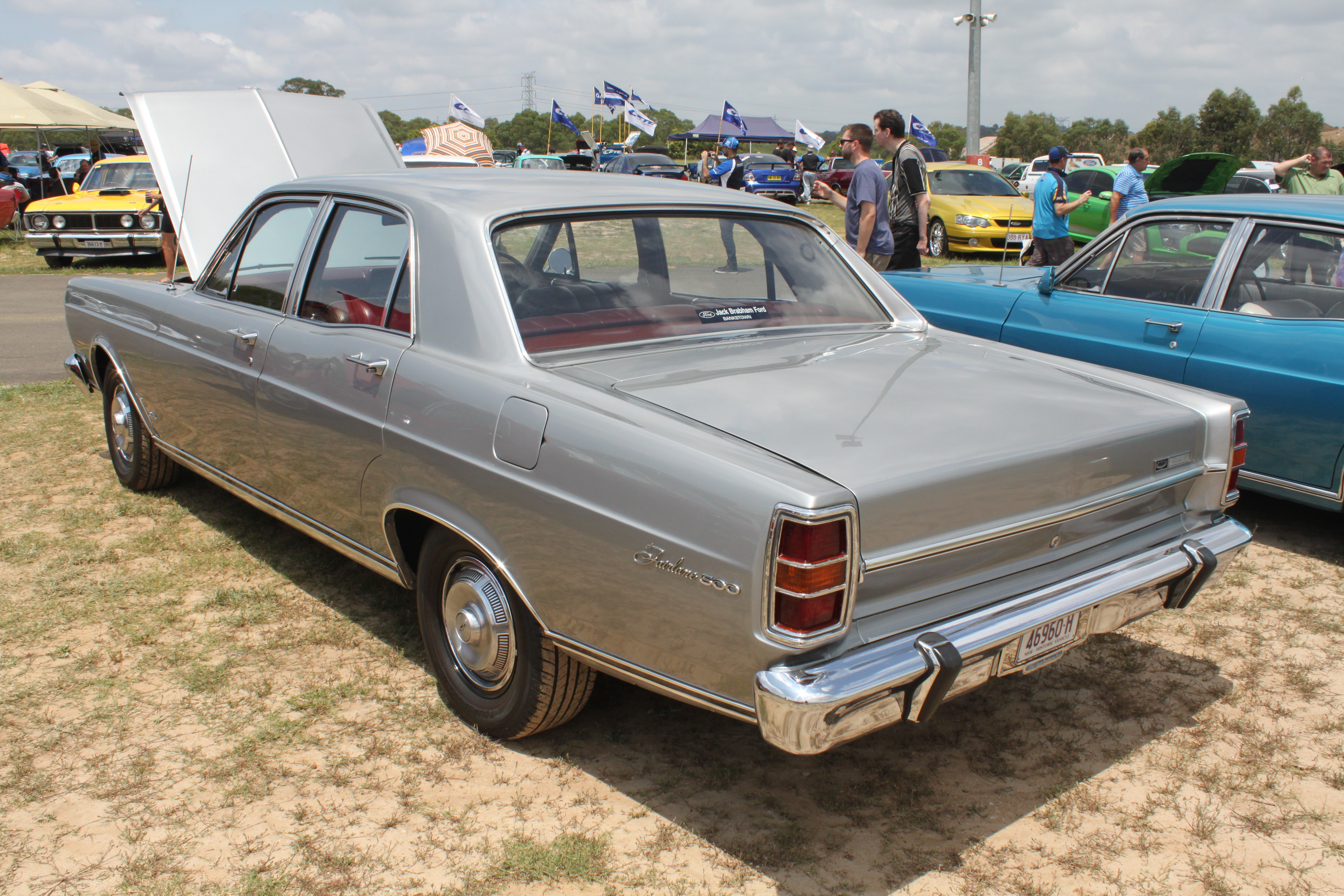
Ford Fairlane (ZC) 500

The facelifted ZC Fairlane series, which was introduced in July 1969, featured vertically stacked rather than horizontal headlights, harking back to the look of the 1966–67 US Fairlane models. Taillights were similar to those on the ZB (again, similar in style to the 1967 US Fairlane with the inclusion of the required amber lens), but with wrap-around styling. The ZC was available in Fairlane Custom and Fairlane 500 models. A 221 cu in (3.6L) straight 6 engine was standard on the Custom, a 302 cu in (4.9L) V8 was standard on the Fairlane 500 and optional on the Custom, and a 351 cu in (5.8L) V8 was optional (with the same specs as the XW GT) on both models. Air conditioning was offered as an option for the first time. 12,513 ZC series Fairlanes were produced.

==== ZD (1970–1972) ====
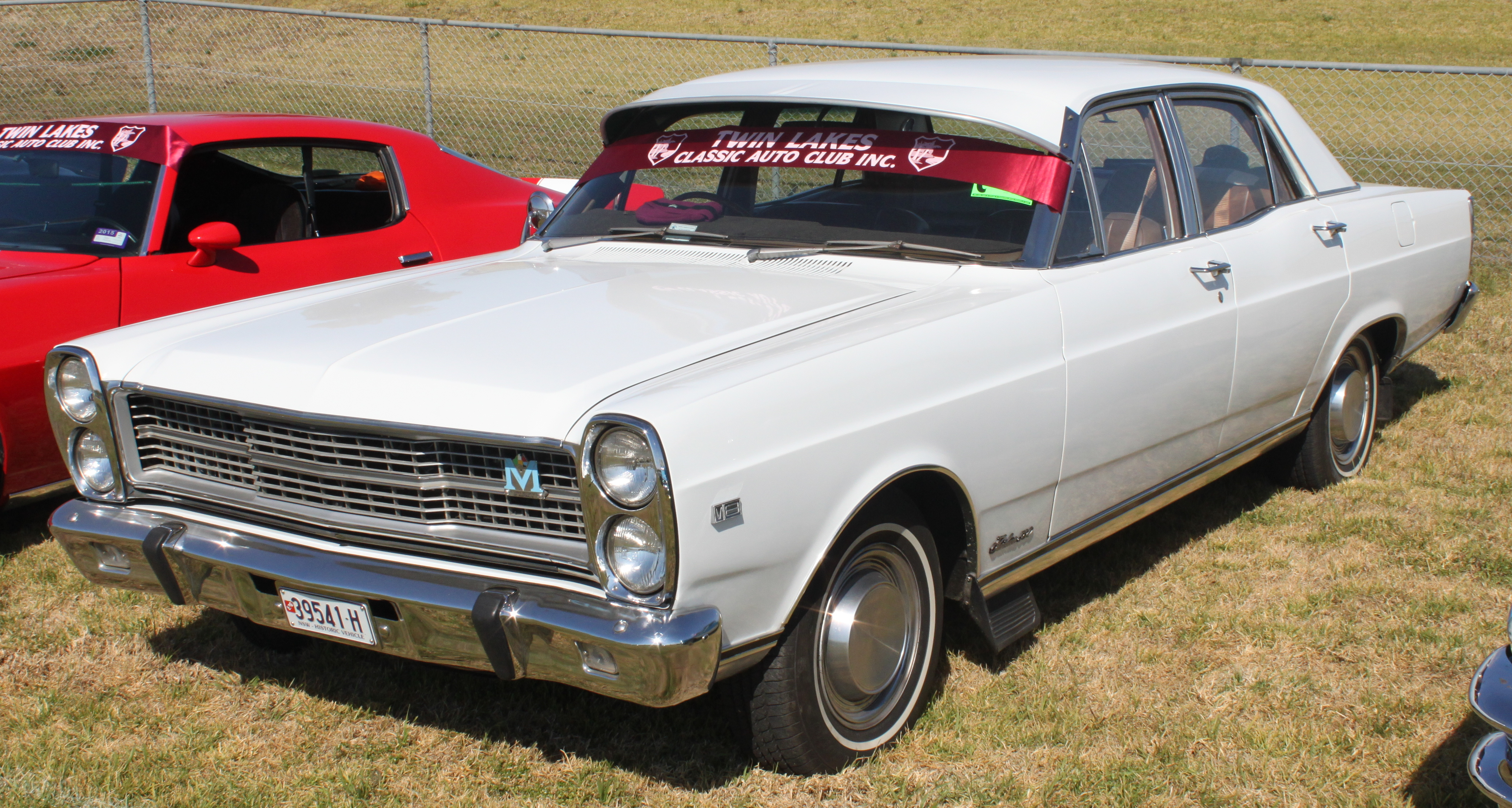
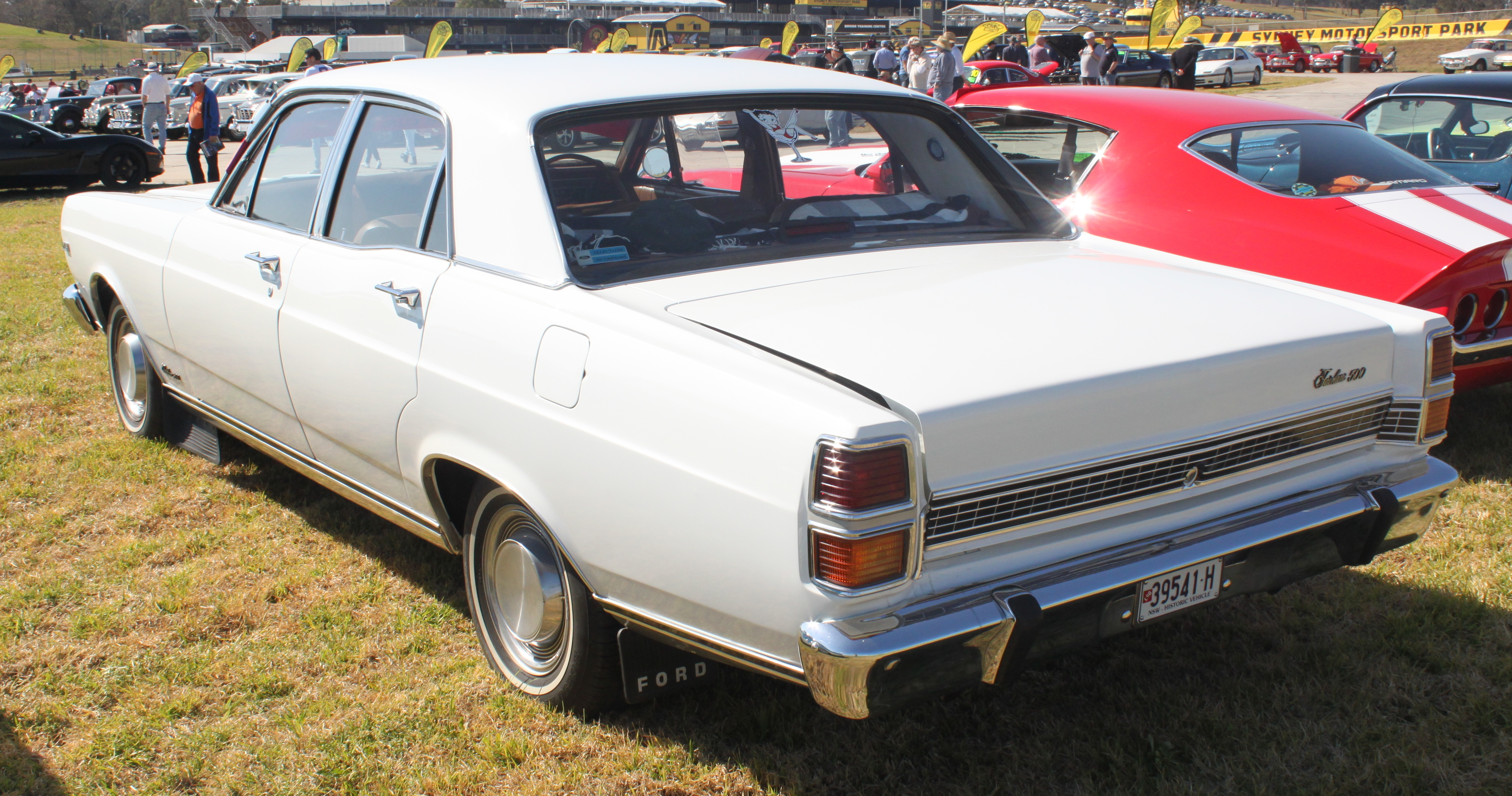
1970–1972 Ford Fairlane (ZD) 500

The ZD series was released in November 1970 for the 1971 model year. The base engine became a 250-cubic-inch (4.1 L) six-cylinder unit, while the 302 and 351 V8s remained, the latter found only in the Fairlane 500. Externally, the taillights were restyled (similar to XY Falcon), and a new plastic grille with metal surround (mimicking the USA and Brazilian market 1966 model year Galaxie 500) and new boot garnish were used. Internally, new door trim patterns debuted and the speedometer backing was now black instead of the silver used on ZCs.

The ZA to ZD were basically stretched versions of the XR to XY series Ford Falcons, respectively, with the extra length added behind the rear door, moving the rear seat back and giving more leg room.

=== Second generation ===
==== ZF (1972–1973) ====
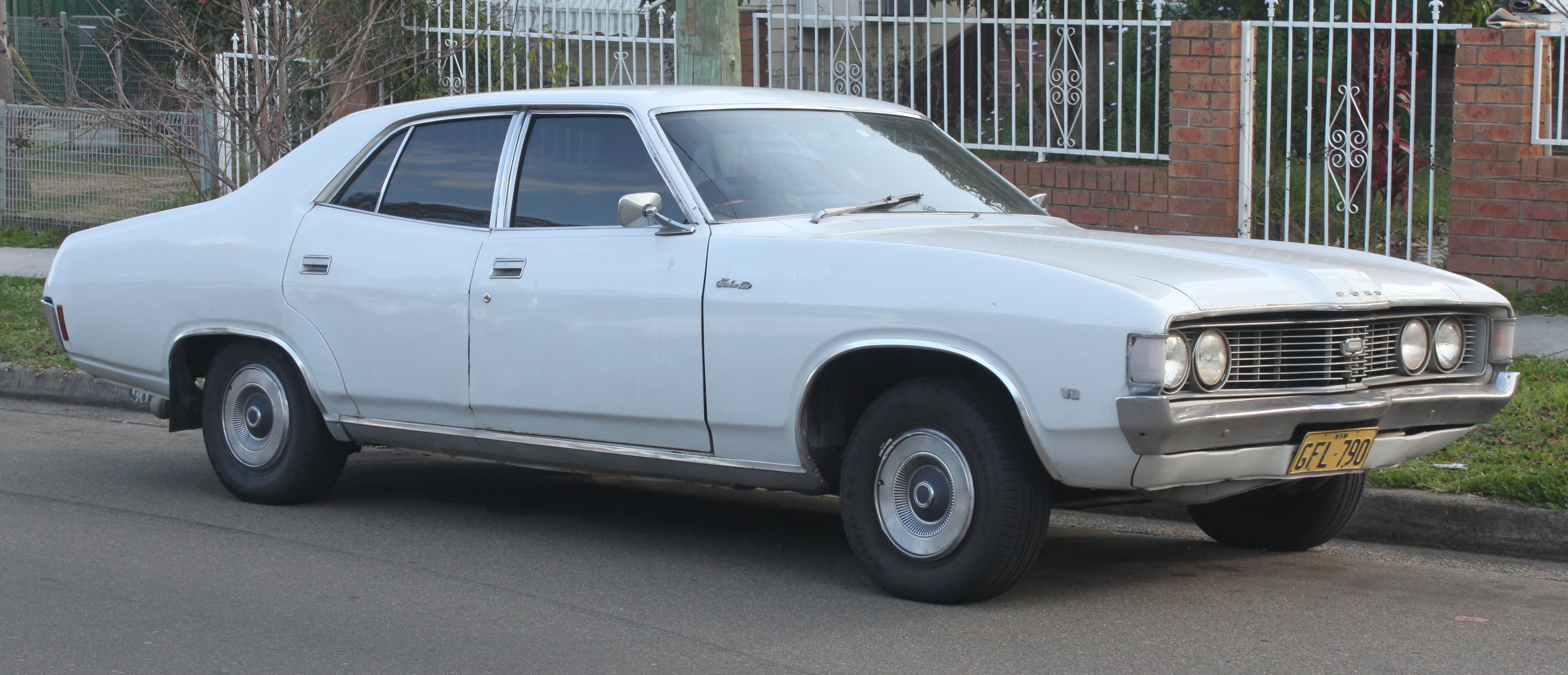
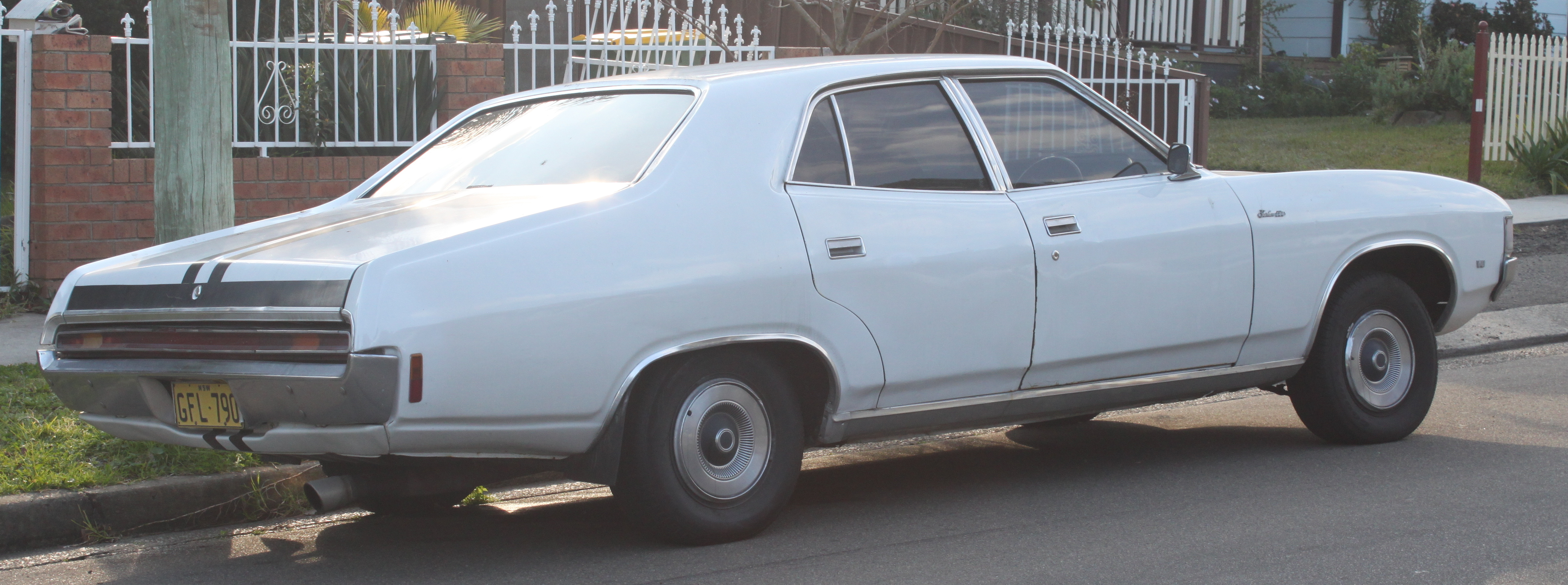
Ford Fairlane (ZF) 500

An all-new, Australian-designed ZF series Fairlane was launched in April 1972, with swoopier bodywork, but criticisms launched that it looked too much like a four-headlamp version of the basic XA Falcon. The ZF Fairlanes were joined by an even more upscale LTD in August 1973, with hidden headlamps and vinyl roofs. Model names remained the same (Custom and 500), as did the engine choices, as the previous model year. Although this car was designed and built exclusively in Australia, its styling is reminiscent of the US-market Mercury Montego. The 1973 ZF also had the last manual transmission; afterwards, all Fairlanes were automatics.

This model was also sold in South Africa, unlike the Falcon, which was discontinued in favour of the European Granada. Only the Fairlane 500, with column shift and seating for six, was available in South Africa. These cars were fitted with the 250 hp (186 kW) Cleveland 351 (5.8-litre) V8 engine.

==== ZG / P5 (1973–1976) ====
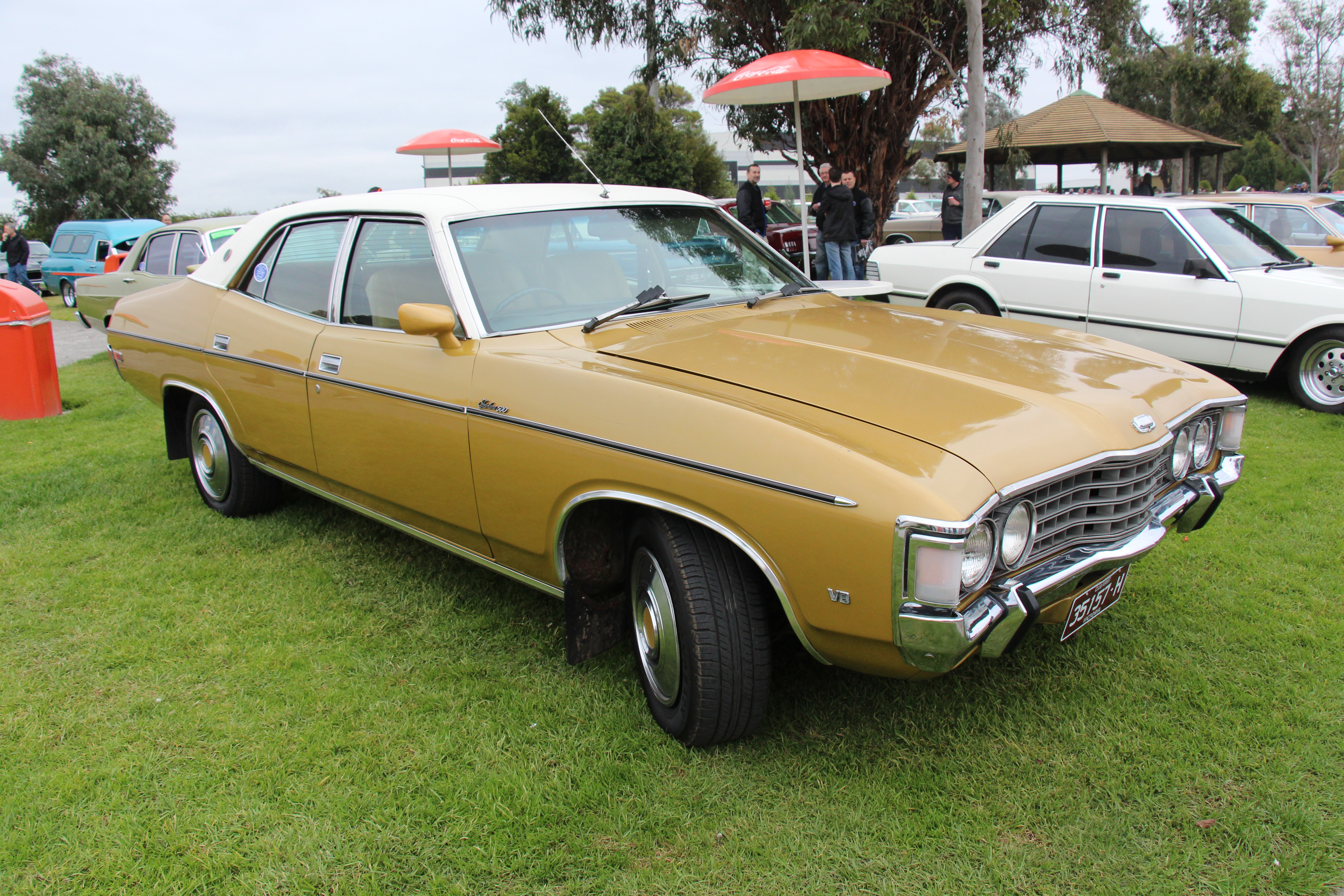
1973–1976 Ford Fairlane (ZG) 500

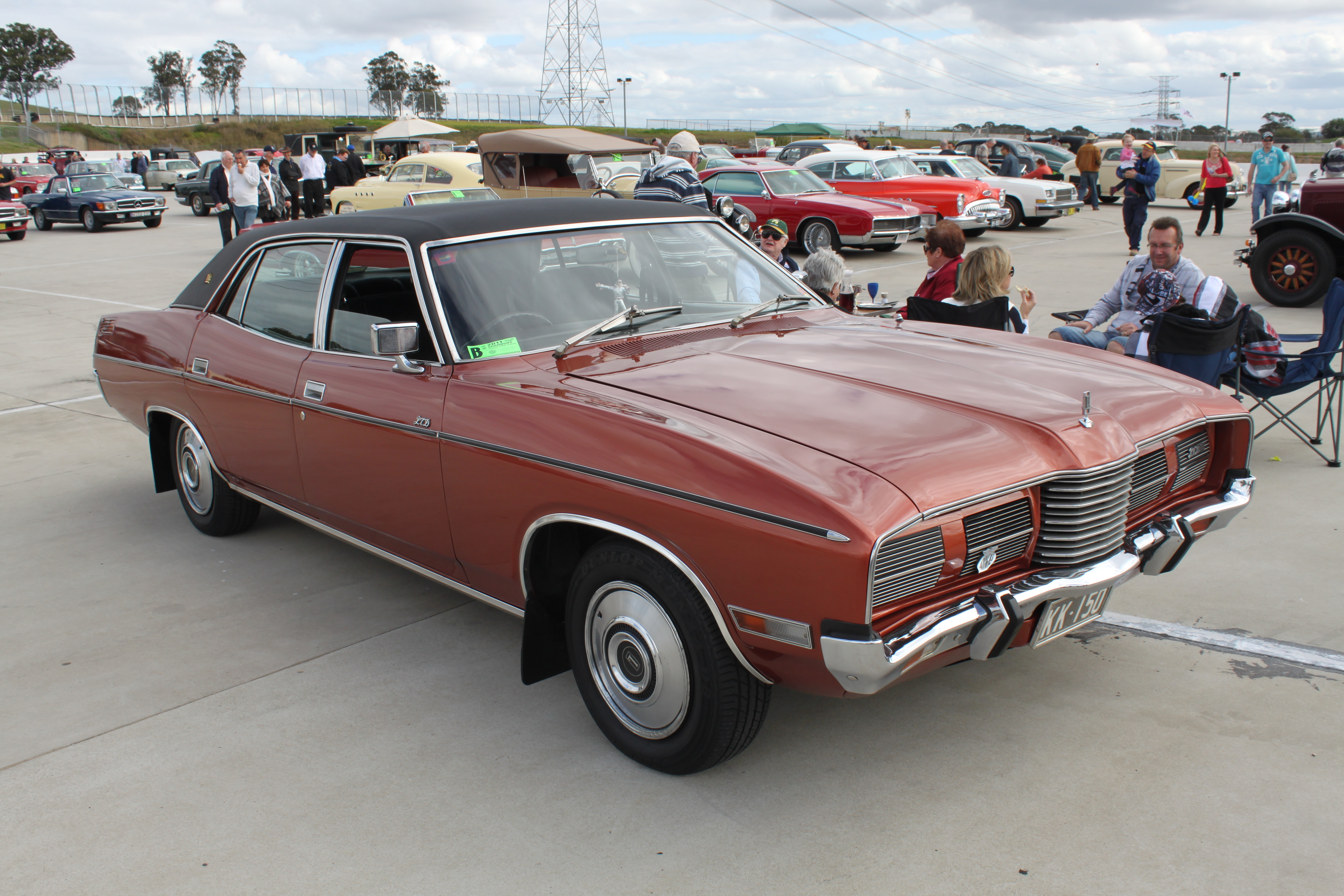
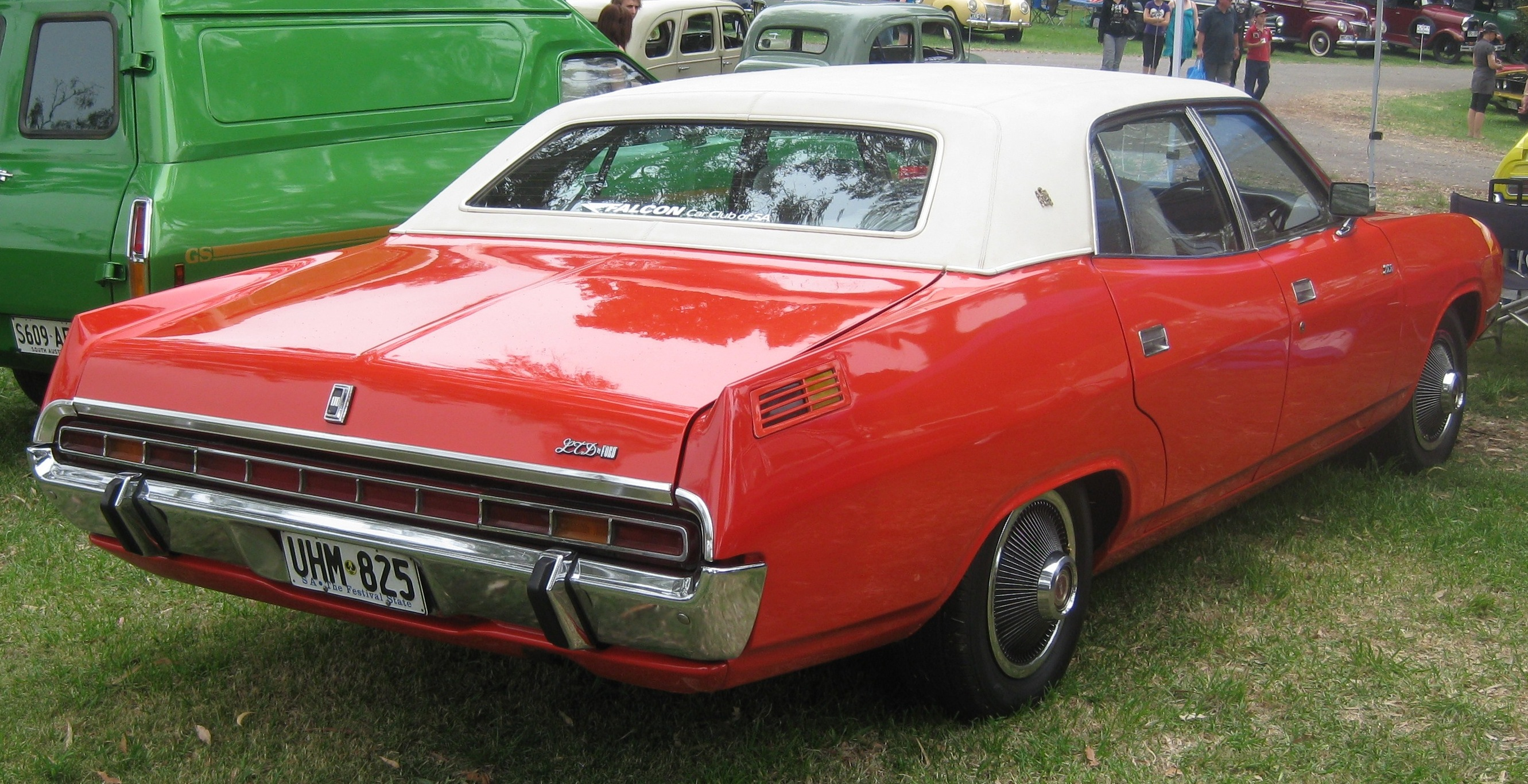
1973–1976 Ford LTD (P5)

November 1973 had the next series of changes, to the ZG-series Fairlane. The changes were mainly cosmetic, with a four-horizontal-bar grille and revised taillight lenses and garnish panel. An anniversary model with a standard 302 was released in 1975, but otherwise the range stayed the same as the 1974 versions. The Fairlane-based P5 series Ford LTD was released very late in the ZF model run in August 1973, three months prior to the ZG Fairlane. The LTD was only available as a four-door sedan, and the wheelbase was even longer than that of the Fairlane, itself a stretched Falcon. A luxury two-door coupé called the Ford Landau (also designated P5) was released at the same time. The Landau was based on the Australian Falcon Hardtop, so featured a 111-inch (2,800 mm) wheelbase as opposed to the 121-inch (3,100 mm) wheelbase of the LTD. Both models were notable for their concealed headlamps, which were revealed when their vacuum-operated grille sections were retracted. The technology was similar to that found on earlier models of the American-built Ford Thunderbird. Standard equipment on both the LTD and the Landau included integrated air conditioning, automatic transmission, electric windows, and a 351ci / 5.8L V8 engine.

Also in July 1975, Ford commenced a release of the Town Cars. These were 50th-Anniversary models, celebrating 50 years of Ford in Australia. They produced 250 of each in the LTD and Fairlane ranges. The Fairlanes in particular were optioned with LTD components, 15-inch wheels, leather interior, and electric windows to name some options. In the Fairlane, only a small handful was special-ordered with a 351 motor. All others were 302s. The LTD was 351-engine cars.

50th Anniversary Model badge

As the P5 was released during the ZF model run, it retained many ZF components. For example, the main interior upgrade from the Fairlane ZF to ZG was the turn signal stalk. The ZF had the older-style stalk with the high beam "dipper" switch on the floor. When the ZG Fairlane was released a big item was the new multifunction column stalk which incorporated the dipper switch and horn. The P5s, however, used the ZF-style stalk and still had a "squeeze rim" horn similar to Falcon GTs of the era. Because the P6 LTD was not released until about five months after the ZH Fairlane, some of the last P5s actually had a few minor ZH parts fitted.

==== ZH / P6 (1976–1979) ====
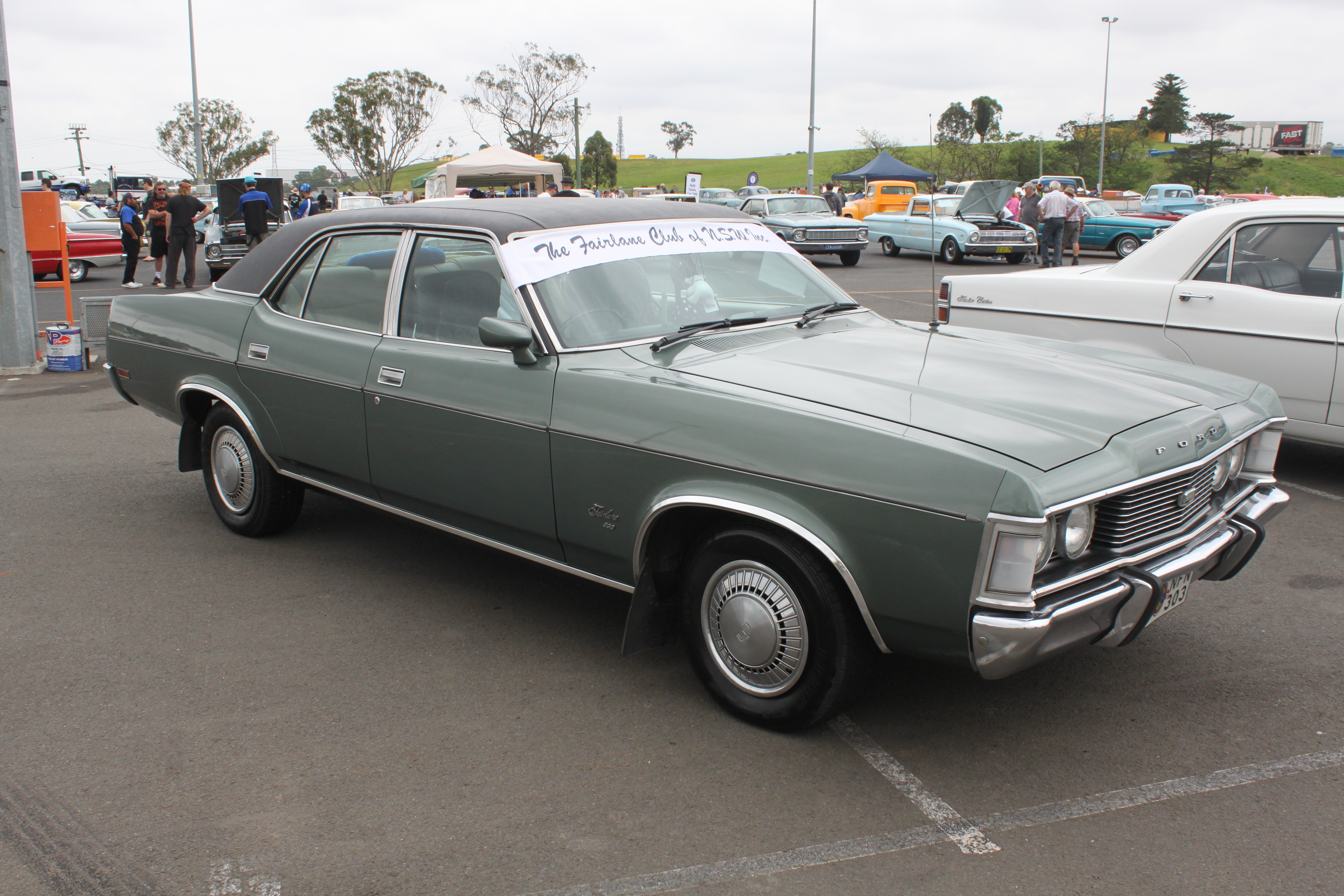
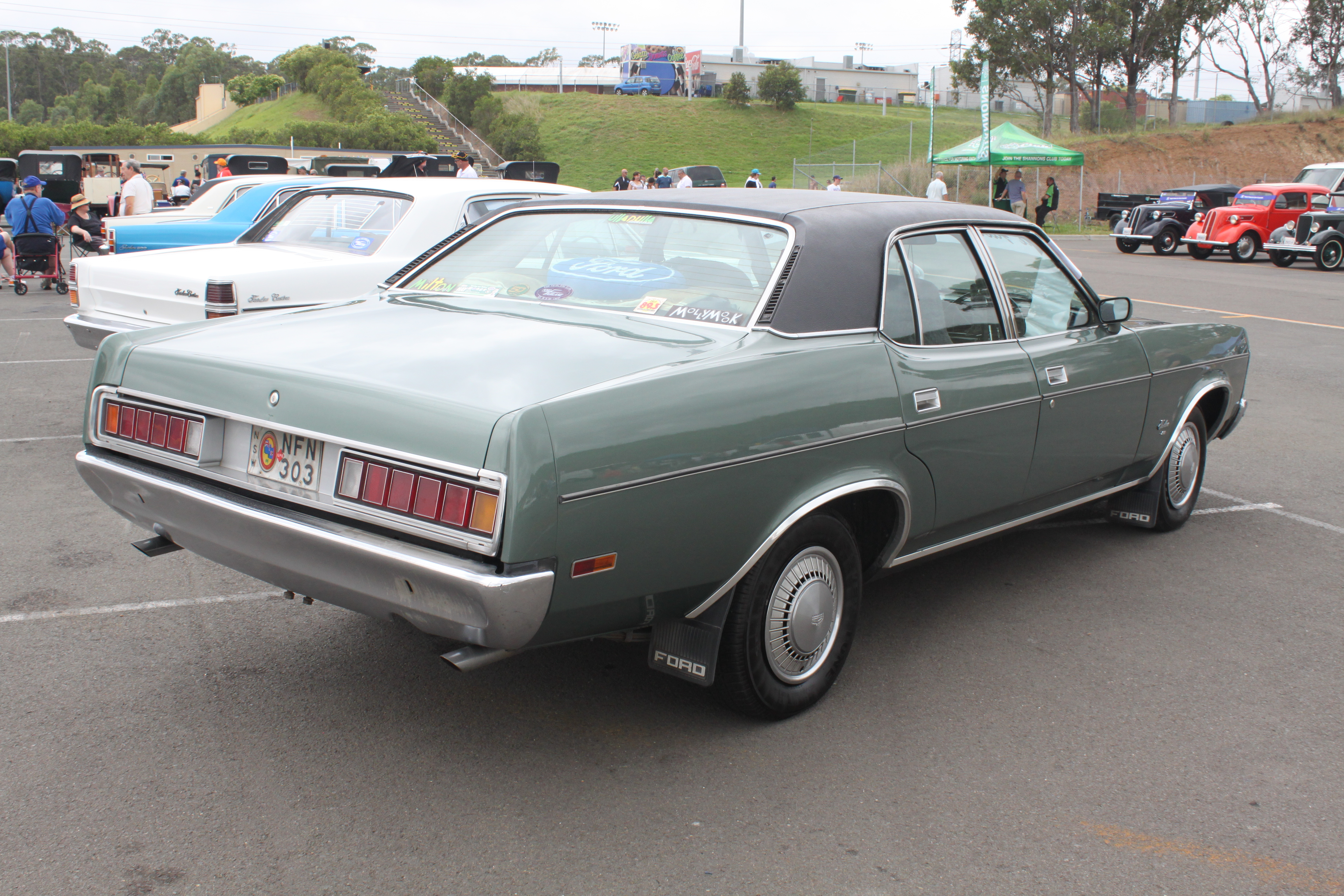
1976–79 Ford Fairlane (ZH) 500

The ZH series addressed earlier complaints about the Fairlane being too close to the Falcon in May 1976. The designers retained the same central section from the upcoming XC Falcon (including that car's new rear doors), but put on lengthened front and rear ends, giving the car more bulk and a luxury impression. The styling was reminiscent of the 1968 Mercury Marquis. The range-topping LTD went further upmarket with a fancy, Rolls-Royce-inspired grille (not dissimilar to that found on the Continental Mark V. Another sign of the upmarket move was the 500 becoming the basic trim (the Custom was deleted), and the Fairlane Marquis being the upscale version. The Marquis was Ford's response to the Statesman Caprice, which was introduced in 1974 as an LTD rival. ZH also moved to the use of the metric system to denote the engine sizes: the basic engine was known as the 4.9 L, the other as the 5.8 L. All ZH Marquises built after January 1979 had Borg-Warner differentials instead of the Ford 9-inch.

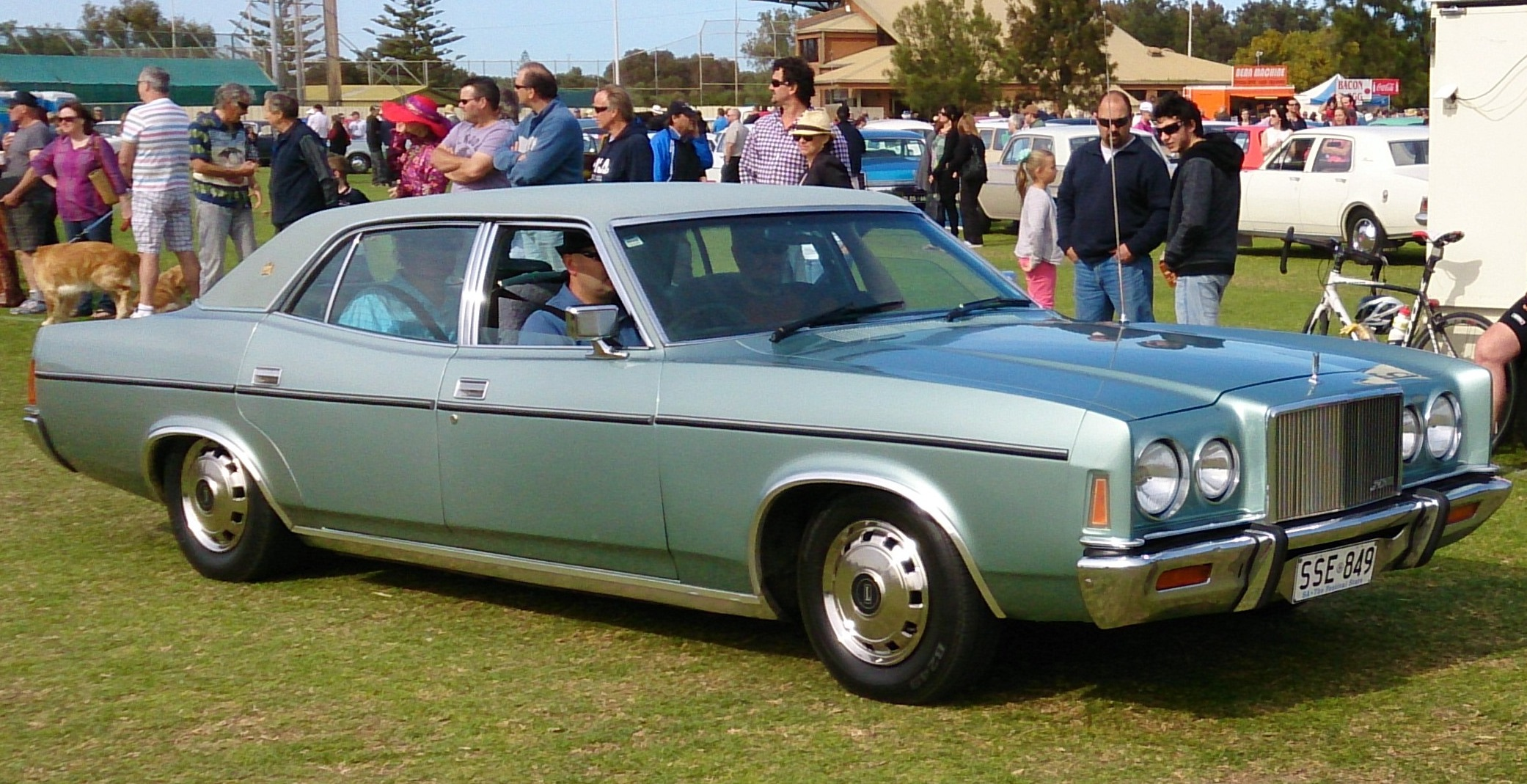
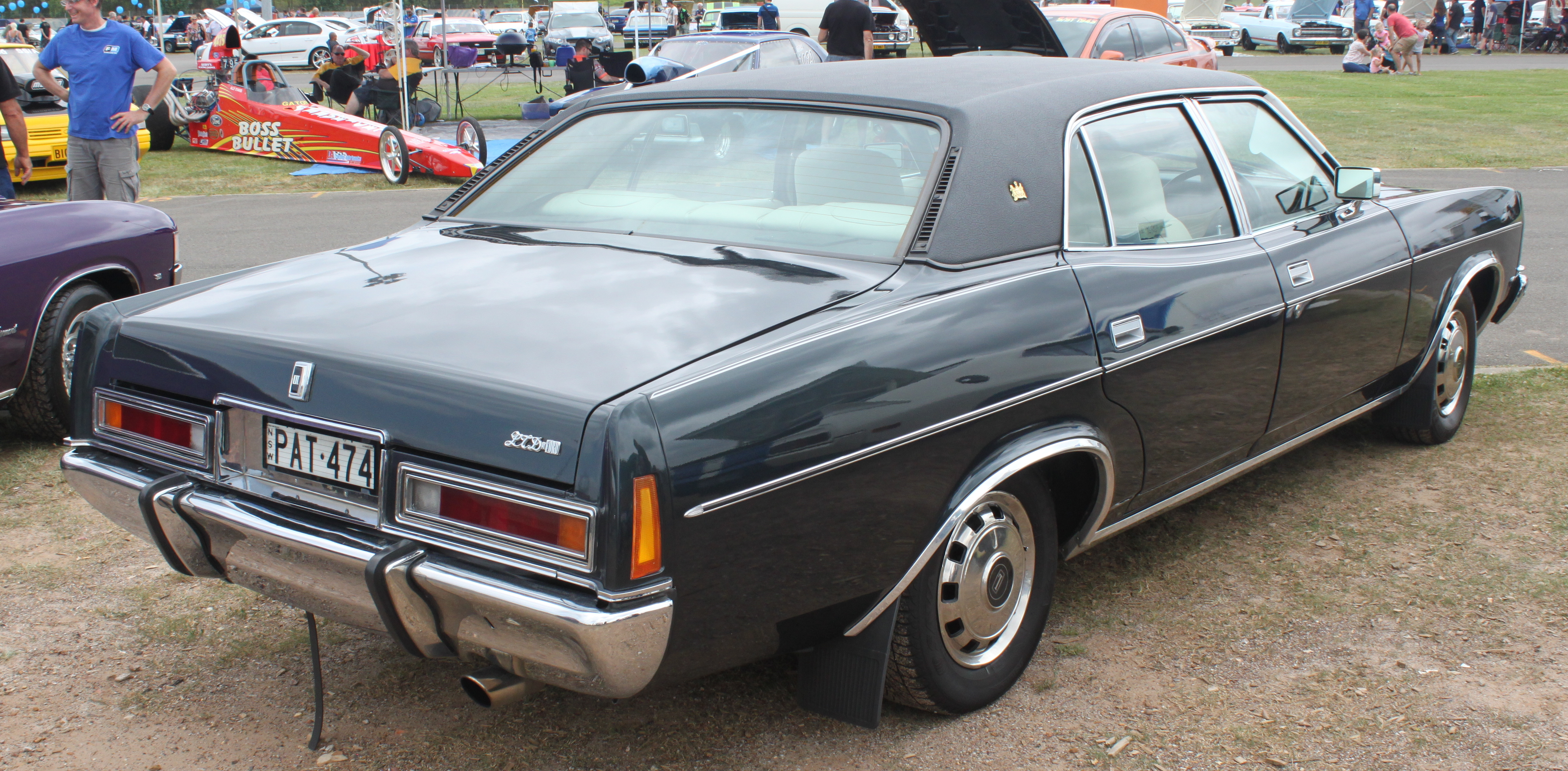
1976–1979 Ford LTD (P6)

The P6 Series LTD was introduced in September 1976. This model had an even more flamboyant grille with four round headlamps, aping Rolls-Royces and other luxury models. The Landau was discontinued at this time. In 1977, a limited-edition LTD "Silver Monarch" model (referencing the Silver Jubilee of Elizabeth II) was released and was only available in a "Stardust Silver" colour, a specially imported silver vinyl roof, and a Cranberry red velour interior. Another limited-edition model, the LTD Town Car was offered in 1978.

=== Third generation ===
==== ZJ / FC (1979–1982) ====
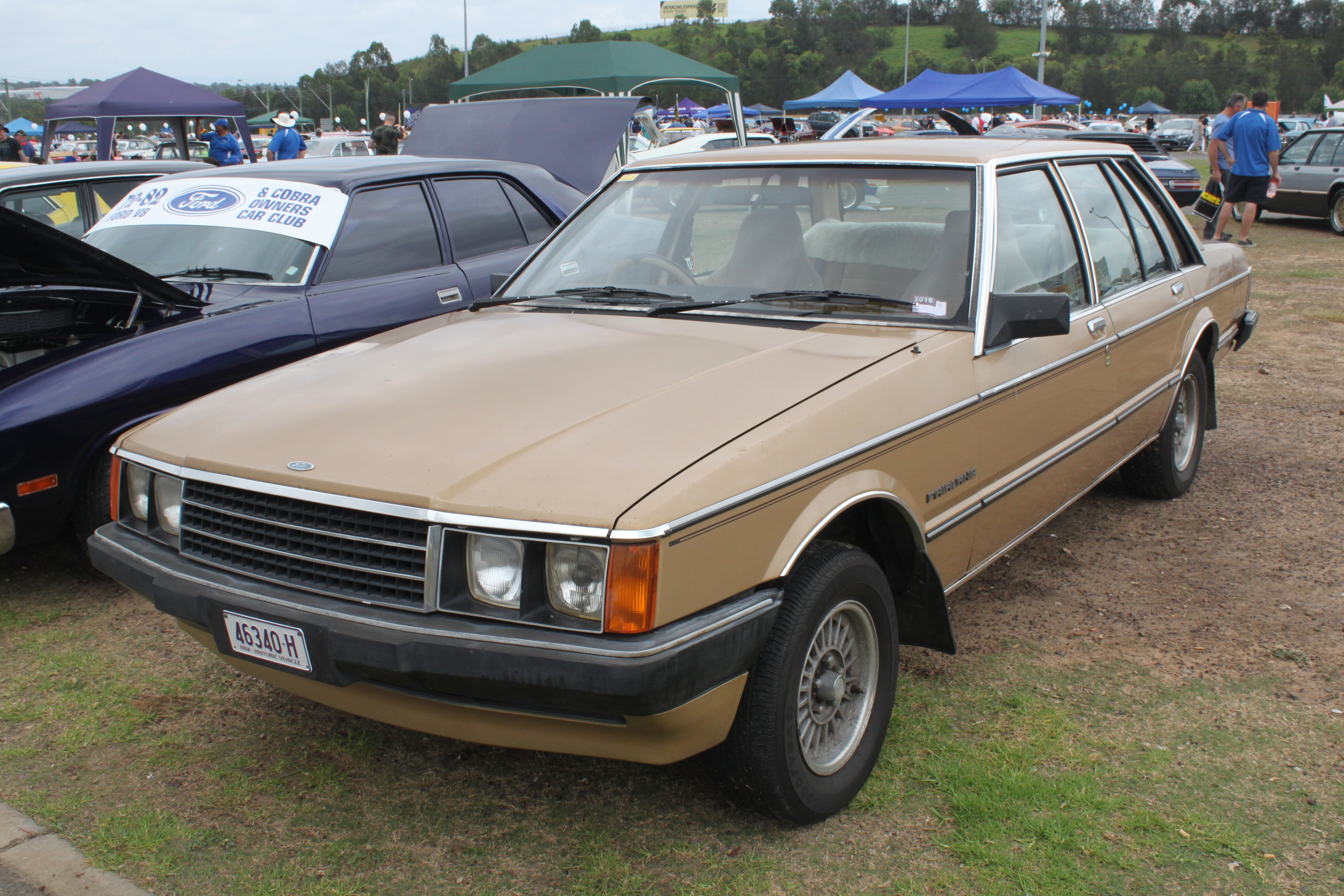
Ford Fairlane (ZJ)

Ford waited until May 1979 before updating the Fairlane to the ZJ Series. This model was a leap ahead into the new decade, with squared-off lines and a six-light bodyshell clearly distinguishing Fairlane from the new XD Falcon of that year. The traditional quad headlights and distinctive vertically striped taillights further differentiated the luxury model from Falcon. The trim levels were deleted: now, only a single Fairlane was available, with 4.9-litre (302 cu in) or 5.8-litre (351 cu in) V8 engine choices. In October, recognising the fuel crisis, Ford introduced a Fairlane with a 4.1-litre (250 cu in) inline-six from the Falcon.

The LTD version of the ZJ surfaced in October 1979 as the FC Series, using the same wheelbase and body panels as the Fairlane. In mid-1980, the Falcon 4.1-litre alloy head engine was made optional, the first time the LTD was available in six-cylinder guise.

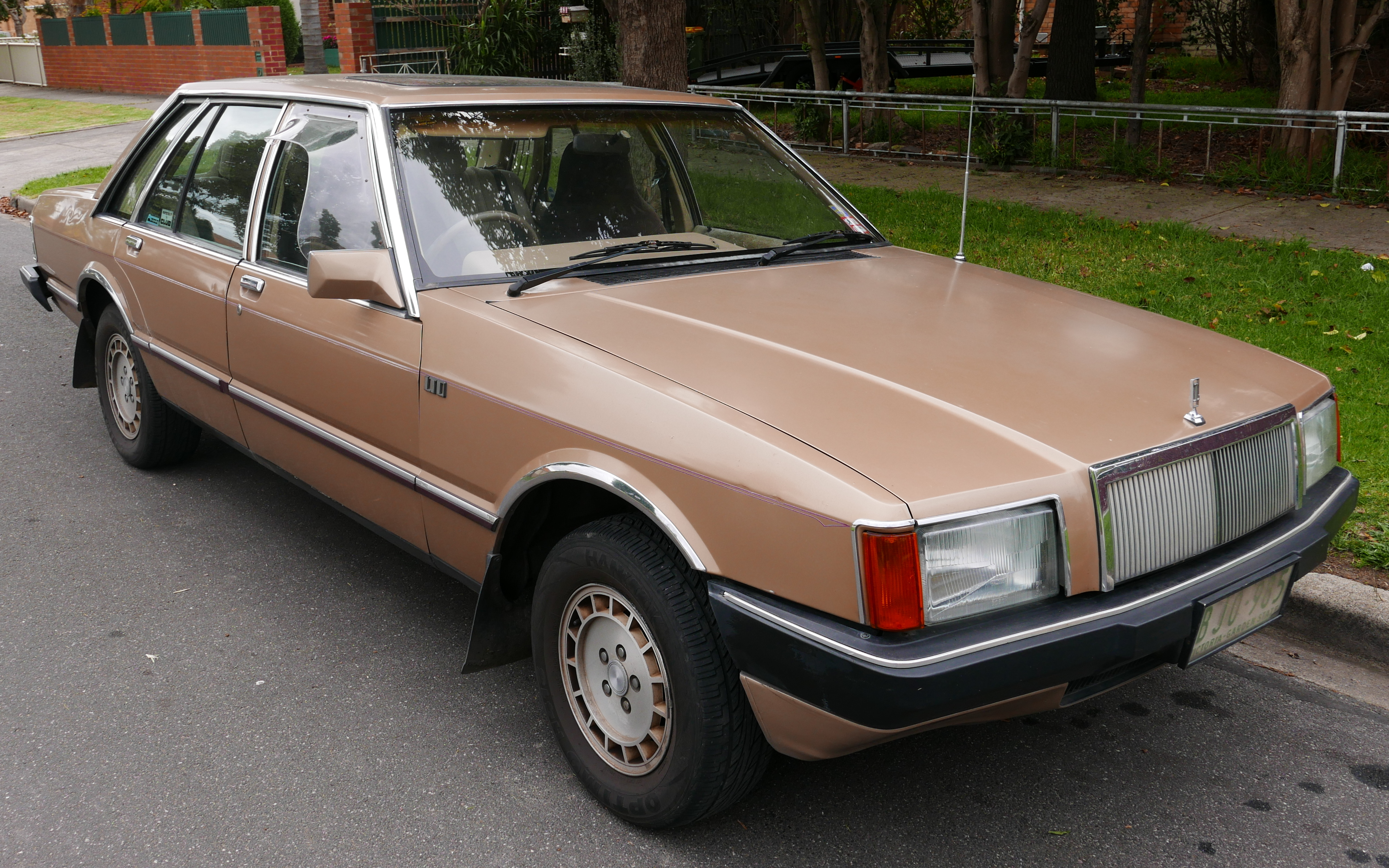
Ford LTD (FC)

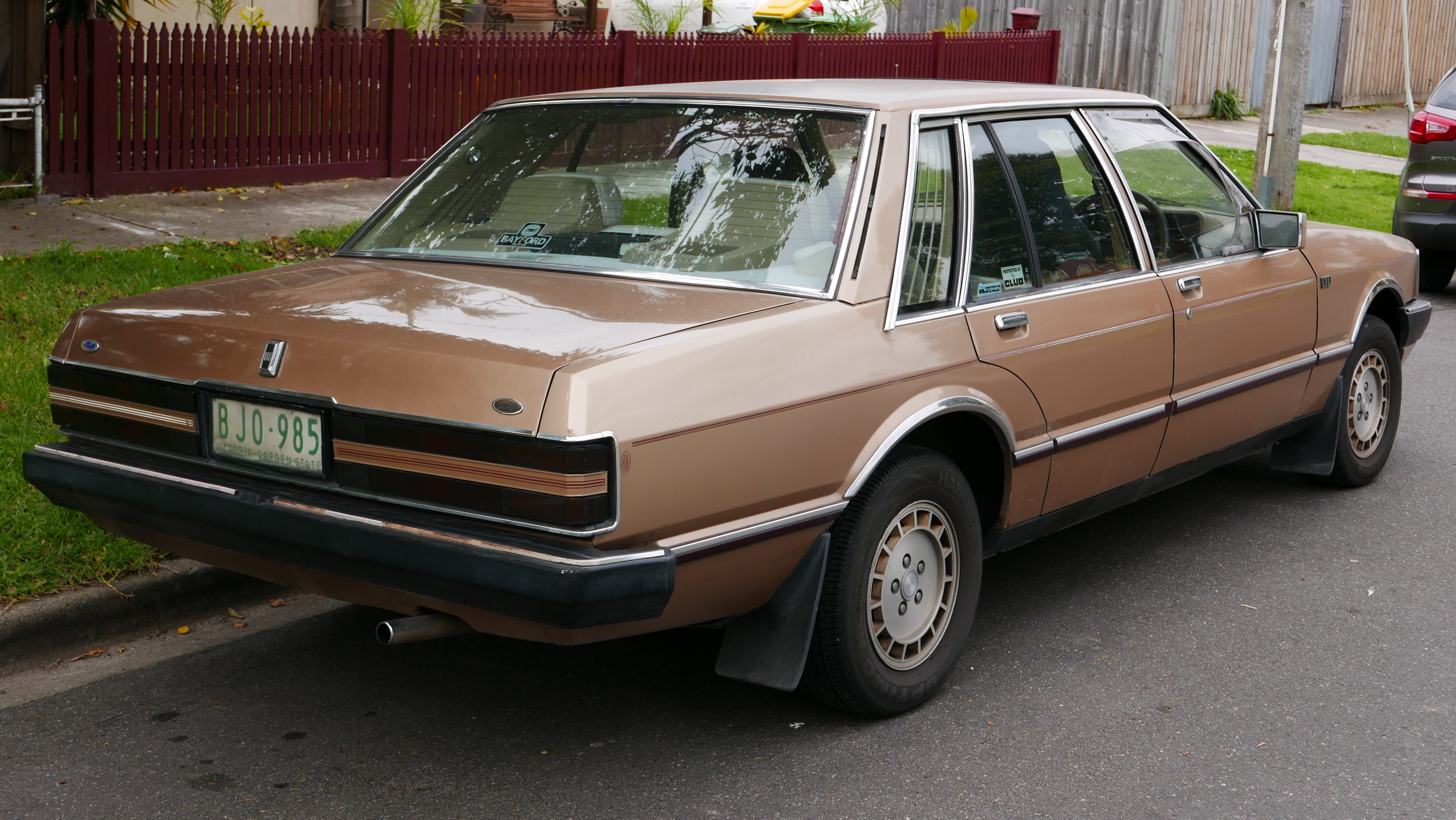
Ford LTD (FC)

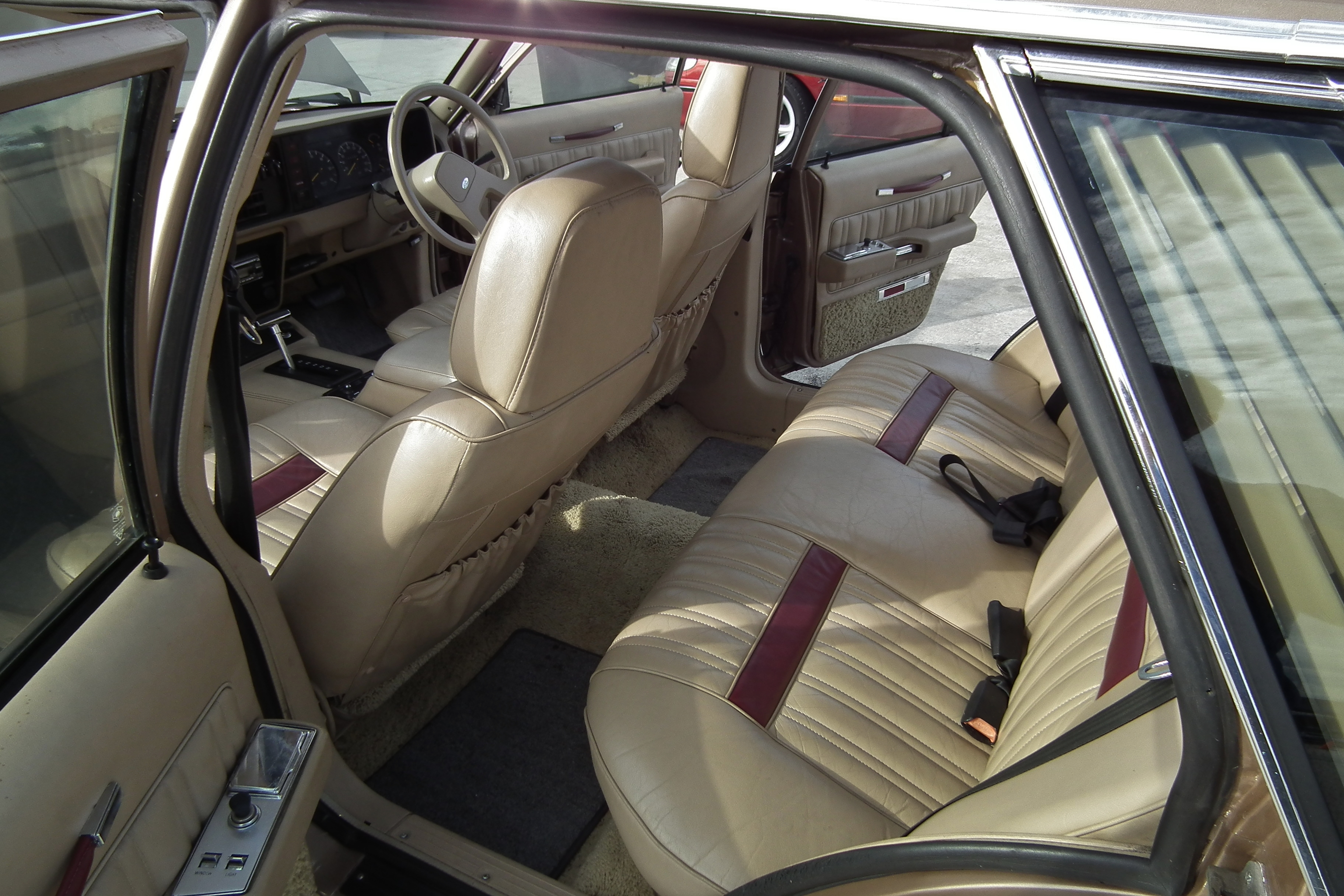
Ford LTD (FC) Cartier

==== ZK / FD (1982–1984) ====
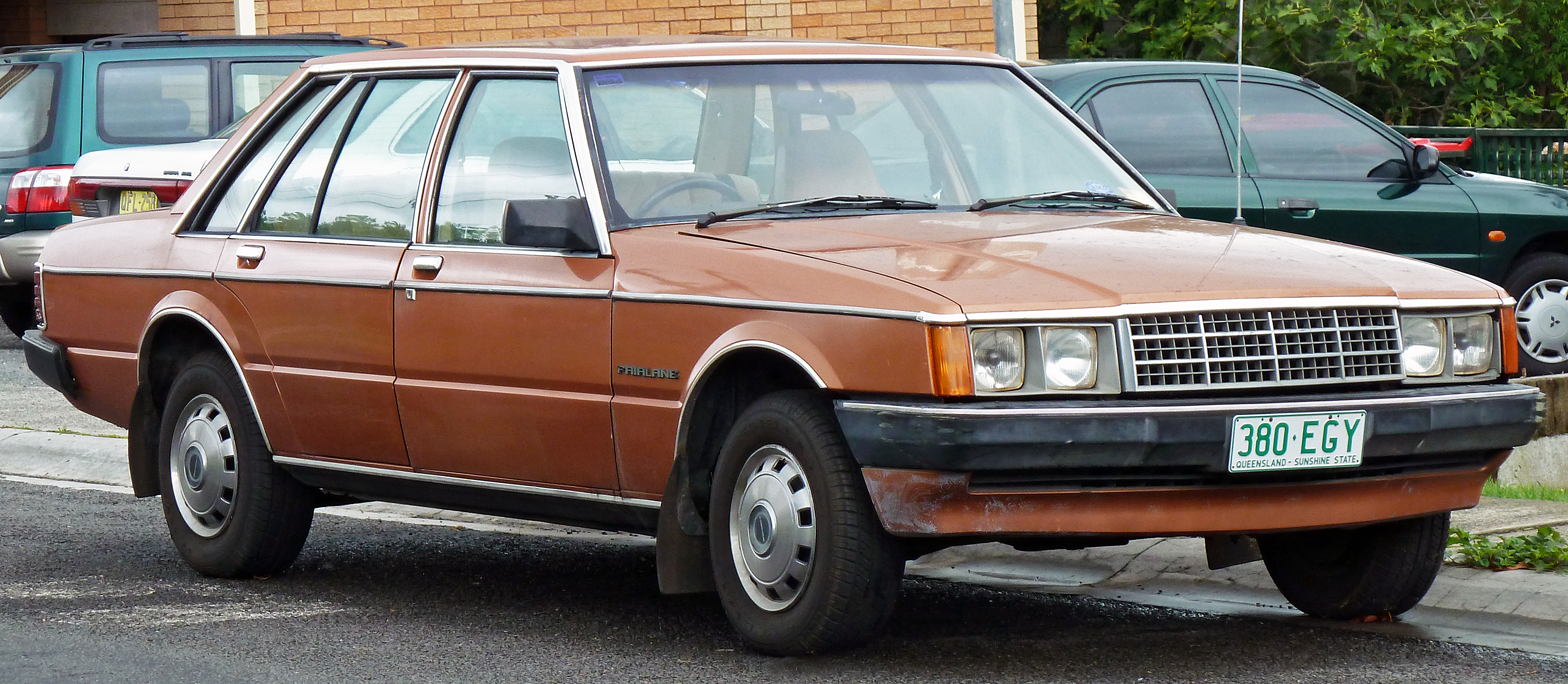
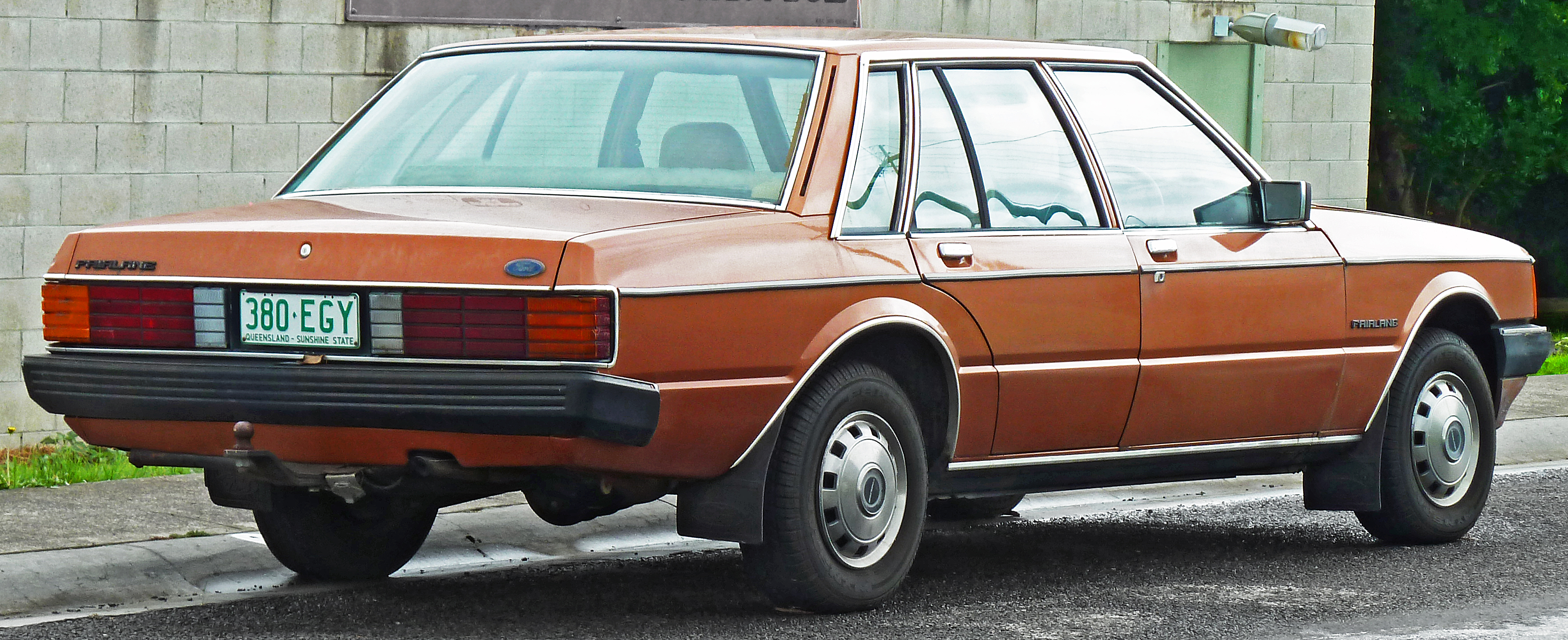
1982–1984 Ford Fairlane (ZK)

The ZK series of March 1982 had the deletion of the 5.8 L V8, which was the first warning the company would soon drop V8s from the local line-up. Minor changes were made to grille and taillights, but otherwise, the external changes were negligible. In March 1983, the 4.9 L V8 was deleted, too, with Ford introducing a fuel-injected version of the six to take its place, claiming the new engine had acceleration figures equivalent to the V8.

The main notable mechanical change was the introduction of the coil sprung, watts link-located rear axle, one of the best live rear-axle configurations.

The LTD FC series was updated to and designated FD in March 1982 with the V8 engine option deleted the following year.

==== ZL / FE (1984–1988) ====
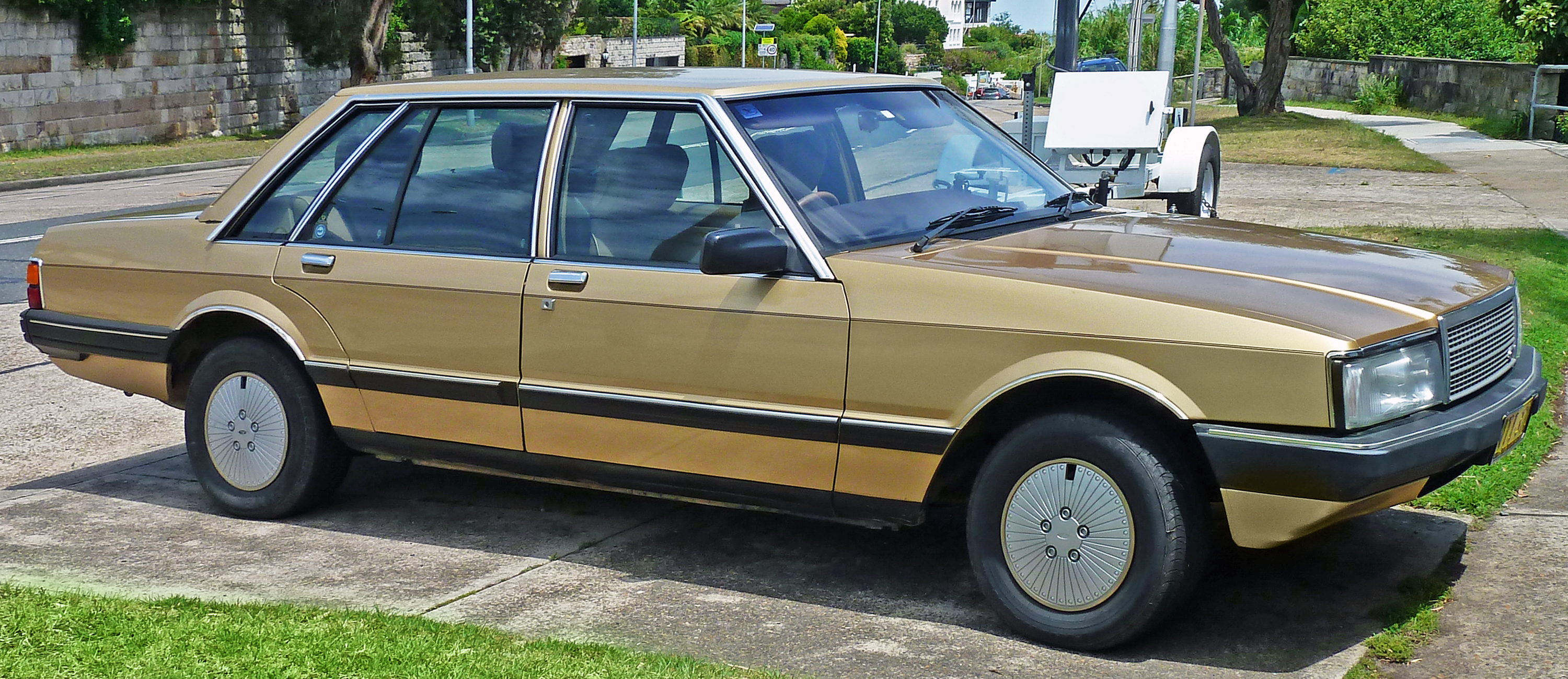
Ford Fairlane (ZL)

The revised ZL series of 1985 (launched October 1984) kept the two six-cylinder engine options; only at the end of 1986 was the carburettor version of the Fairlane removed. The ZL again carried over all external panels, but now had integrated headlights with clear indicators, full wrap-around bumpers, and new taillights of the XF Falcon. Inside, a full digital dashboard was introduced with push-button controls at either end of the instrument binnacle. The FE series LTD was also released in October 1984.

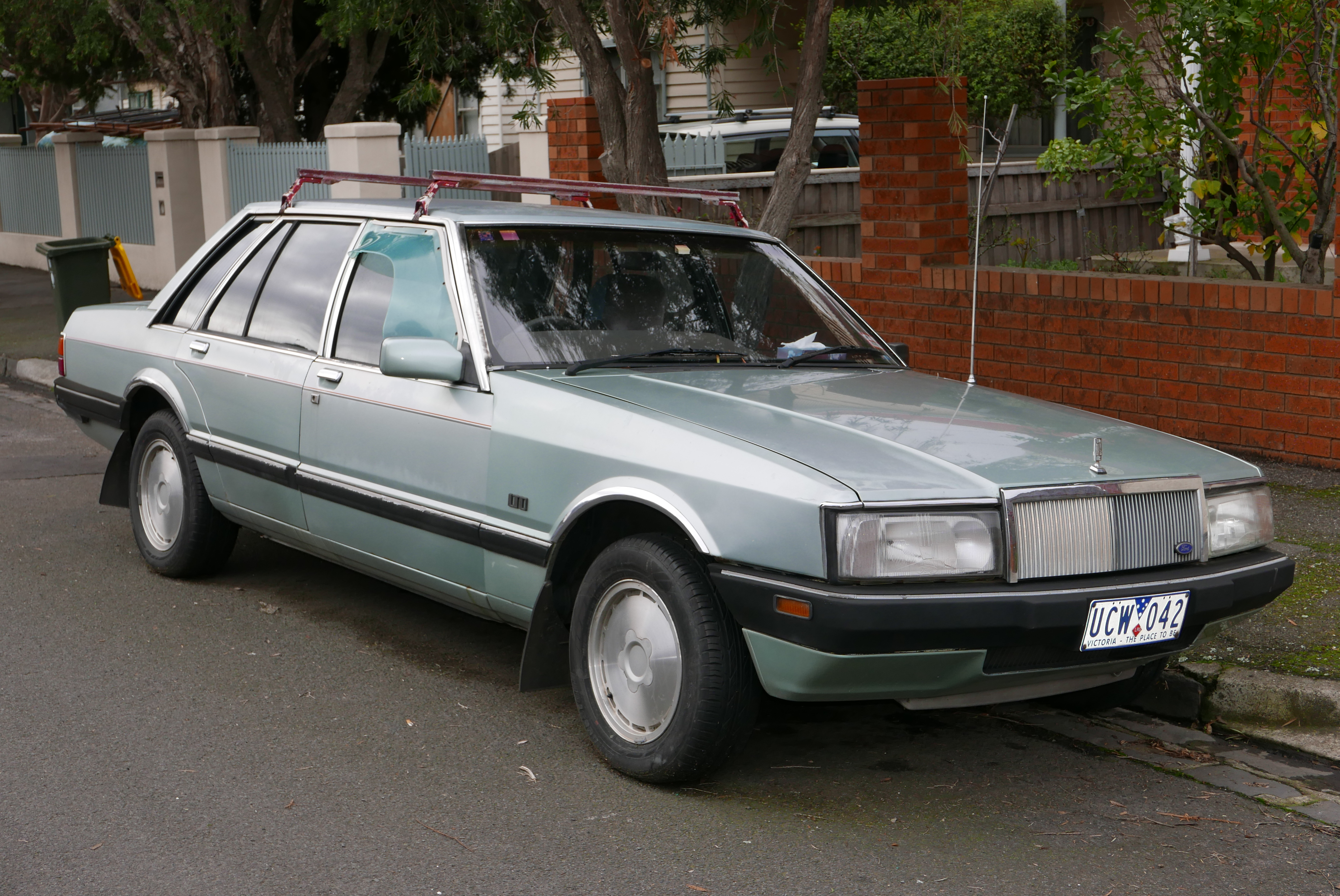
Ford LTD (FE)

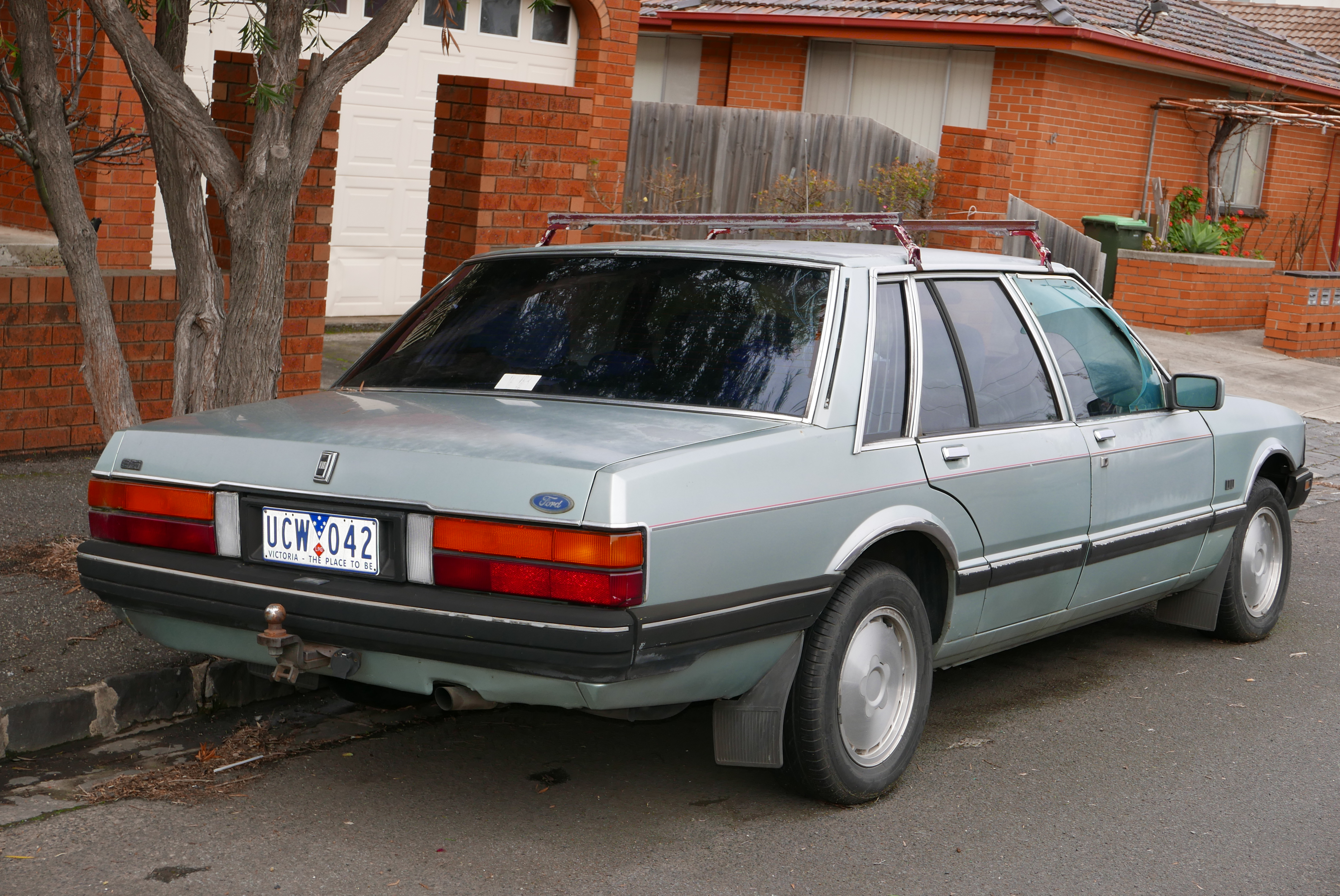
Ford LTD (FE)

=== Fourth generation ===
==== NA / DA (1988–1991) ====
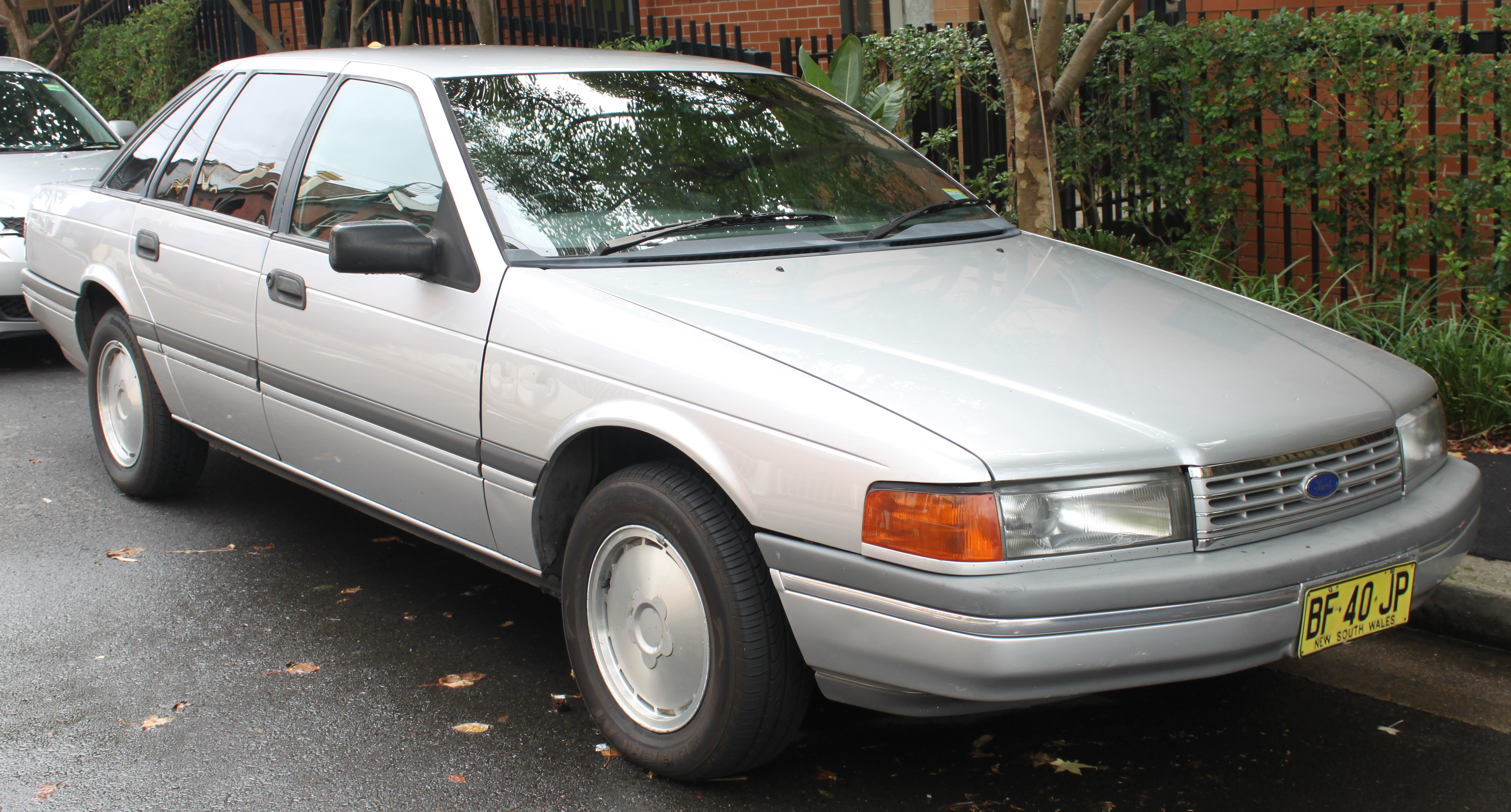
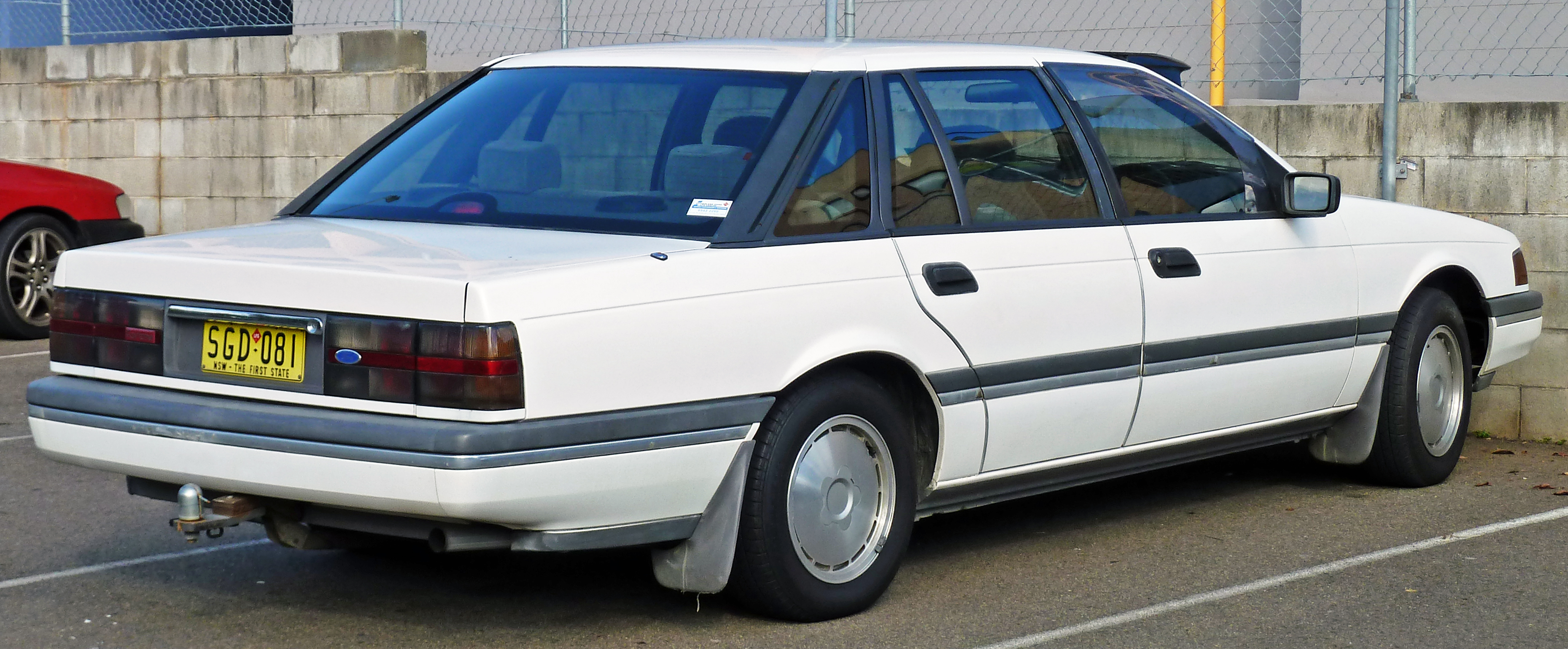
Ford Fairlane (NA II)

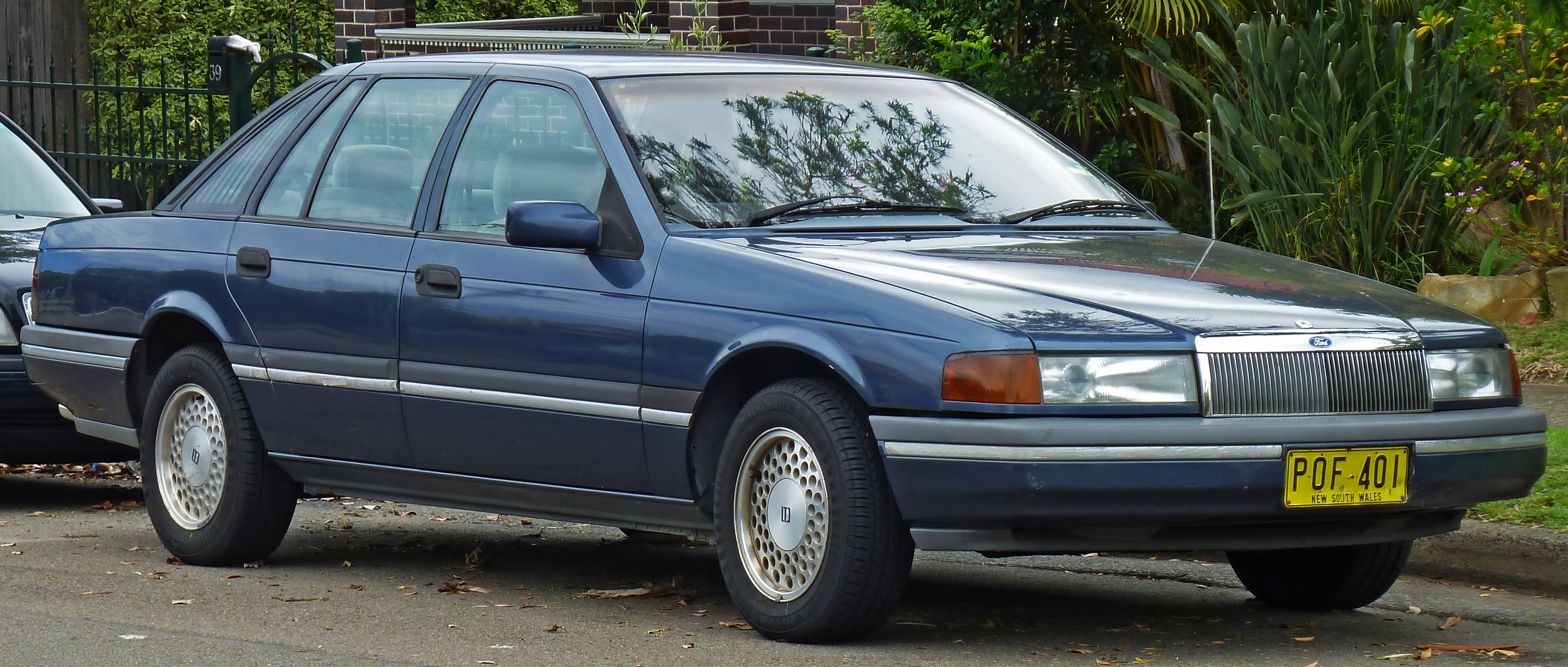
Ford LTD (DA II)

June 1988 had the next major revision; the Fairlane's straight edges gave way to gentle curves, based on the EA26-platform EA Falcon. The philosophy was the same - a long-wheelbase Falcon with a six-light body. The 4.1 L six was heavily revised, becoming a 3.9 L unit with improved fuel economy and power. These models were part of the EA26 development programme and platform (E for the market segment, A for Australia, 26 the project code). Therefore, officially they were EA26s, but colloquially, Ford aficionados prefer a two-letter code. Hence, the new Fairlanes were given the NA series code.

The equivalent LTDs came on stream as the DA series in June 1988. Like the previous generation, all N-series Fairlanes and D-series LTDs were built on the Falcon/Fairmont station-wagon platform, and this legacy is most noticeable in the disproportionally narrow station-wagon rear doors on what was meant to be a limousine and in a car that otherwise caters well for rear-seat passengers with a large amount of interior seating and legroom space. Nonetheless, these large sedans were "limousine enough" to be one of the most common platforms used by Australian body-building companies to make stretch limousines.

Revisions from November 1989 for the 1990 model year had the release of the NA II and DA II, the most notable change being the fitting of a four-speed, rather than three-speed, automatic transmission (since the Fairlane's debut, it had a three-speed).

Although Ford Australia's former official historian, the late Adrian Ryan, was emphatic, officially, an NB series Fairlane never existed, at least one early 1989 prototype fitted with a four-speed automatic escaped from the factory bearing a compliance plate marked "NB" and was registered as an "NB Fairlane". Ford also produced an alloy wheel identification-guide poster for its parts counters listing one wheel as being for an "NB Sportsman Fairlane" and at one point the Series II NA likely was going to be called the NB. Third-party parts suppliers also often list both an "NB Fairlane" an "NB – Series II Fairlane" in their parts catalogues adding to the NB mystery. DOTARS (the Commonwealth Department of Transport and Regional Services) has no record of giving Ford approval to use an "NB Fairlane" compliance plate for a production model which might explain Ford's reluctance to officially acknowledge the "NB".

==== NC / DC (1991–1995) ====
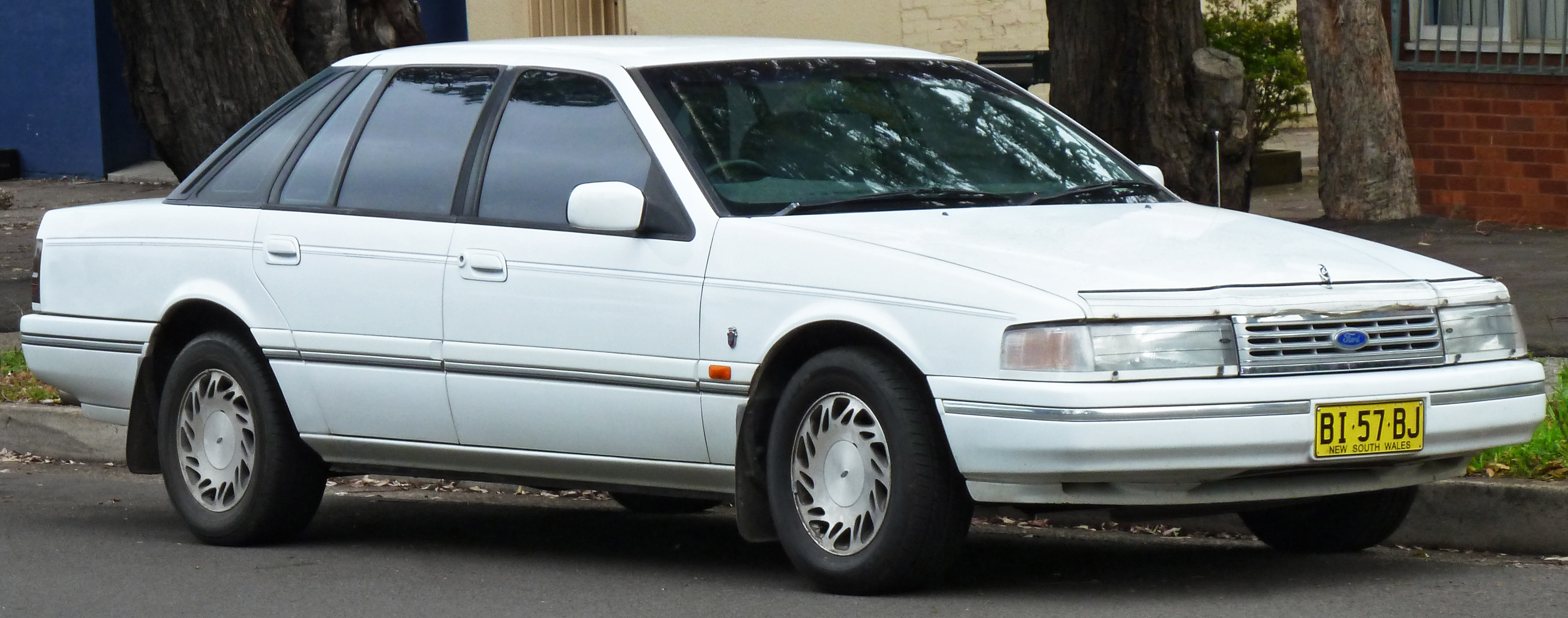
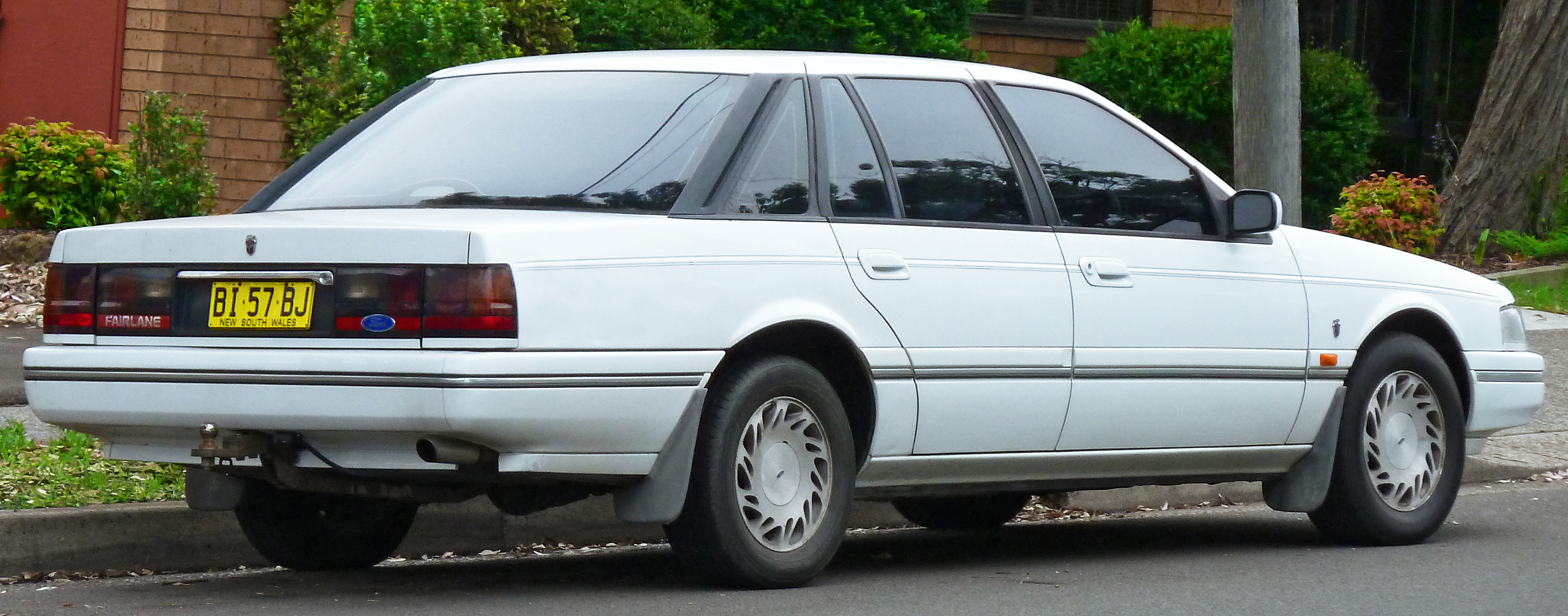
1993 Ford Fairlane (NC II) Ghia sedan

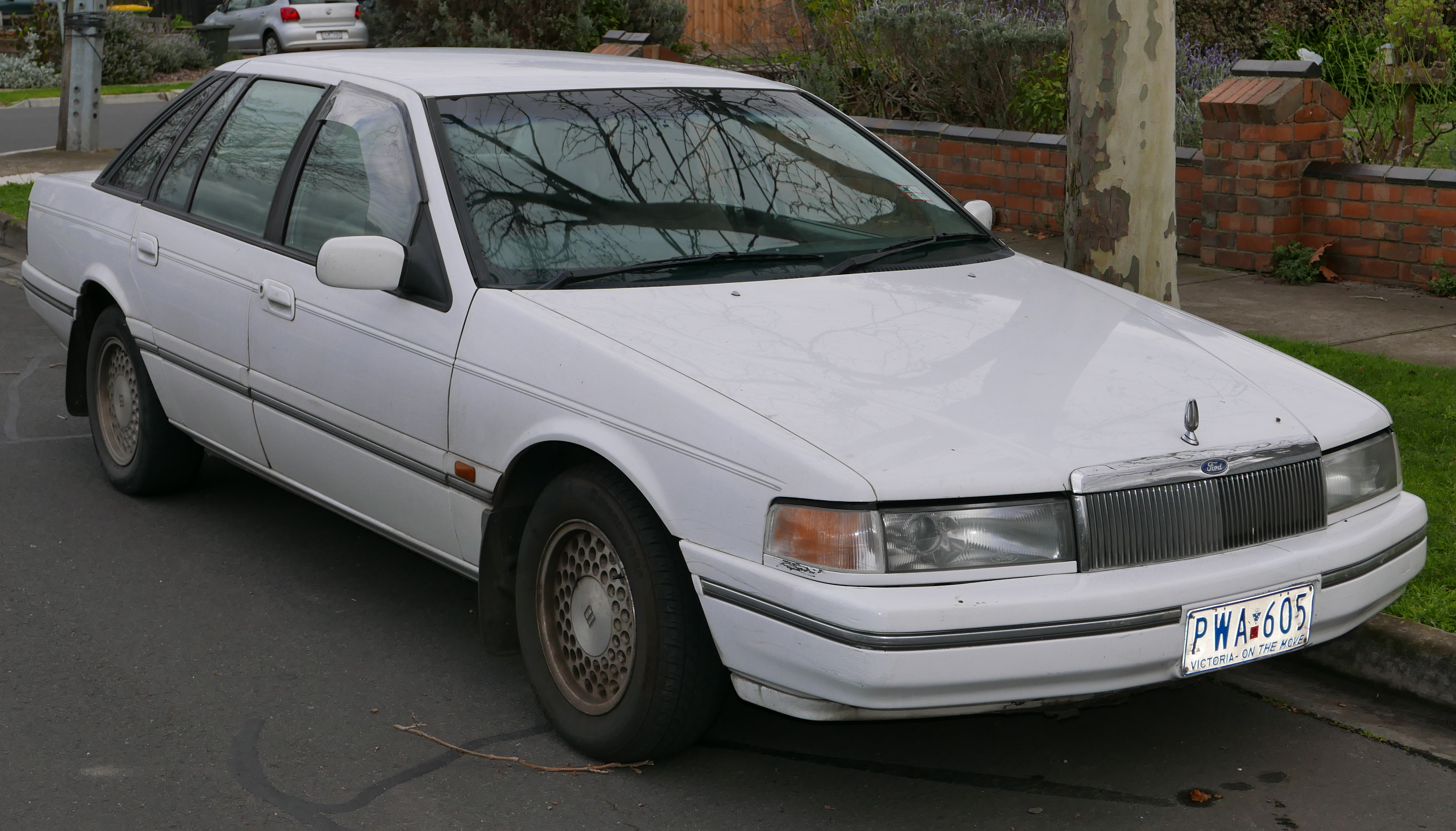
1994 Ford LTD (DC II)

August 1991 had the news that many Fairlane/LTD purists had awaited: the reintroduction of the V8 in the NC Fairlane and DC-series LTD. Ford had never recovered from removing the V8s in the 1980s and bowed to public pressure with its reintroduction. The 5.0 L engine was not identical to the one used in the United States Mustang and other passenger cars. For reason of better durability and perhaps cost, it was the Canadian-made Windsor engine used in the North American light truck and 4WD models. To meet the needs of the space required for a right-drive steering column, its inlet manifold was reversed. Again to meet the conversion to right-hand drive and the rerouted inlet ducting, air box, and air conditioning lines, the Australian-installed engines also had most of their serpentine belt-driven accessories on the opposite side to the US/North American models. As Australian enthusiasts often found to their frustration, these subtle changes often meant that many Ford Racing/SVO add-on bits, like the available superchargers, were not exactly the bolt-on items they were in North America. The inline-six continued. The NC also introduced a higher-spec Fairlane, called the Fairlane Ghia, and the V8 was available in this model.

The 1992 NC II and DC IIs redesignated the 3.9 L engine a "4.0-litre", but trim levels remained the same. To appeal to younger buyers, Ford briefly sold a Fairlane Sportsman Ghia in 1993 with a "Tickford"-tuned 4.0 L six used in the Falcon XR6. A second, even smaller update, known as the NC III, arrived in August 1993. It is the equivalent to the ED series Falcon, adopting the new "ozone safe" R134a air conditioning refrigerant. The base Fairlane model was also discontinued, leaving only the Fairlane Ghia.

From March 1994 production, the NC received additional changes - the fitment of a leather-wrapped steering wheel, body-coloured bumpers and side protection strips, new-design alloy wheels, and a bonnet ornament.

An idea proposed in the late 1980s was a Fairlane wagon. Most likely, had it entered production, it would have used the Falcon wagon (which rode on the Fairlane's wheelbase) body, coupled with the Fairlane's front clip.

In the early 1990s, the Falcon utilities were still of the previous-generation XF. A prototype EB Falcon utility was made which looked Fairlane-based. To impart a look of solidness, the ute had a Fairlane frontal treatment. It did not enter production.

==== NF / DF (1995–1996) ====
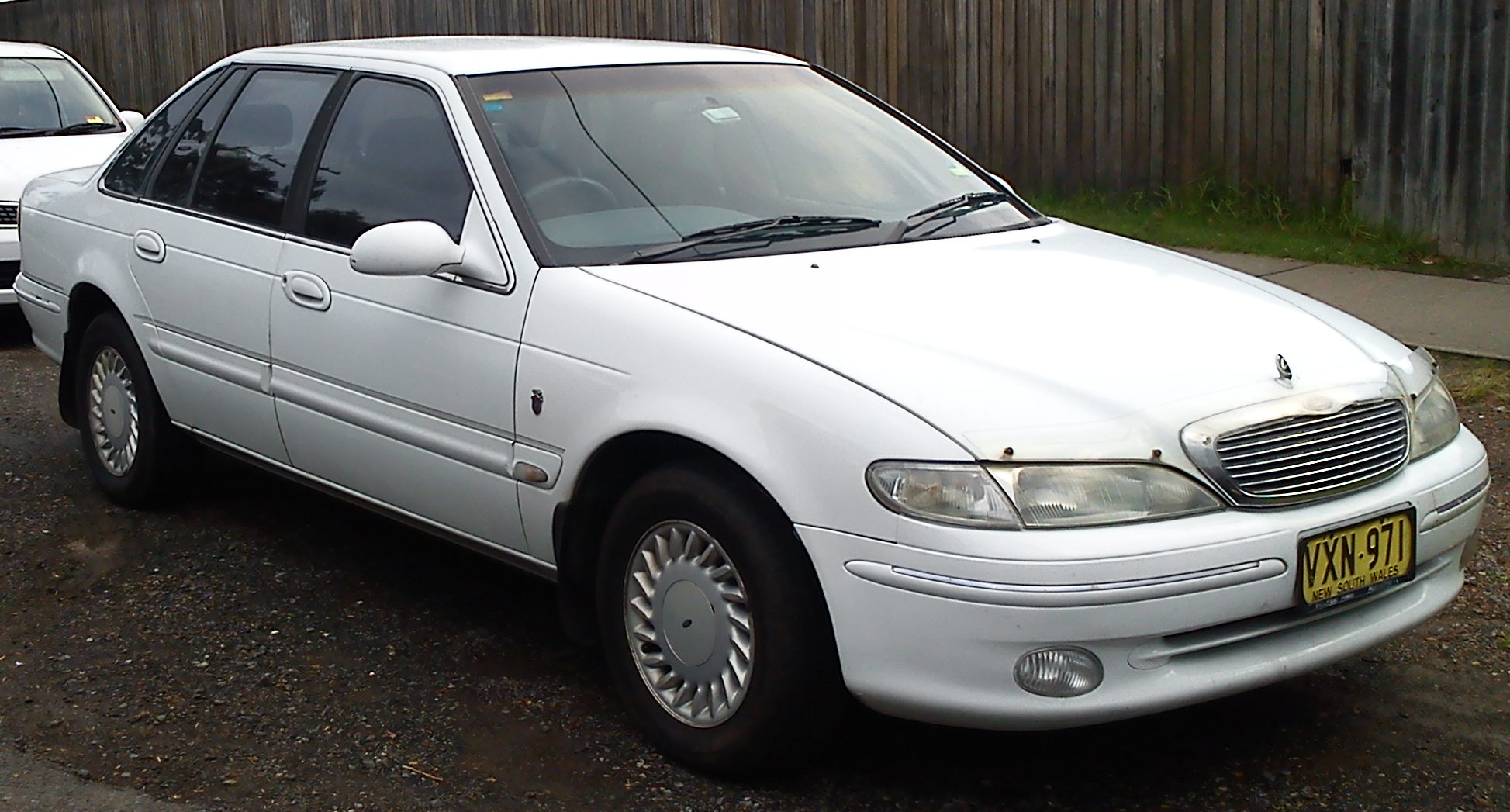
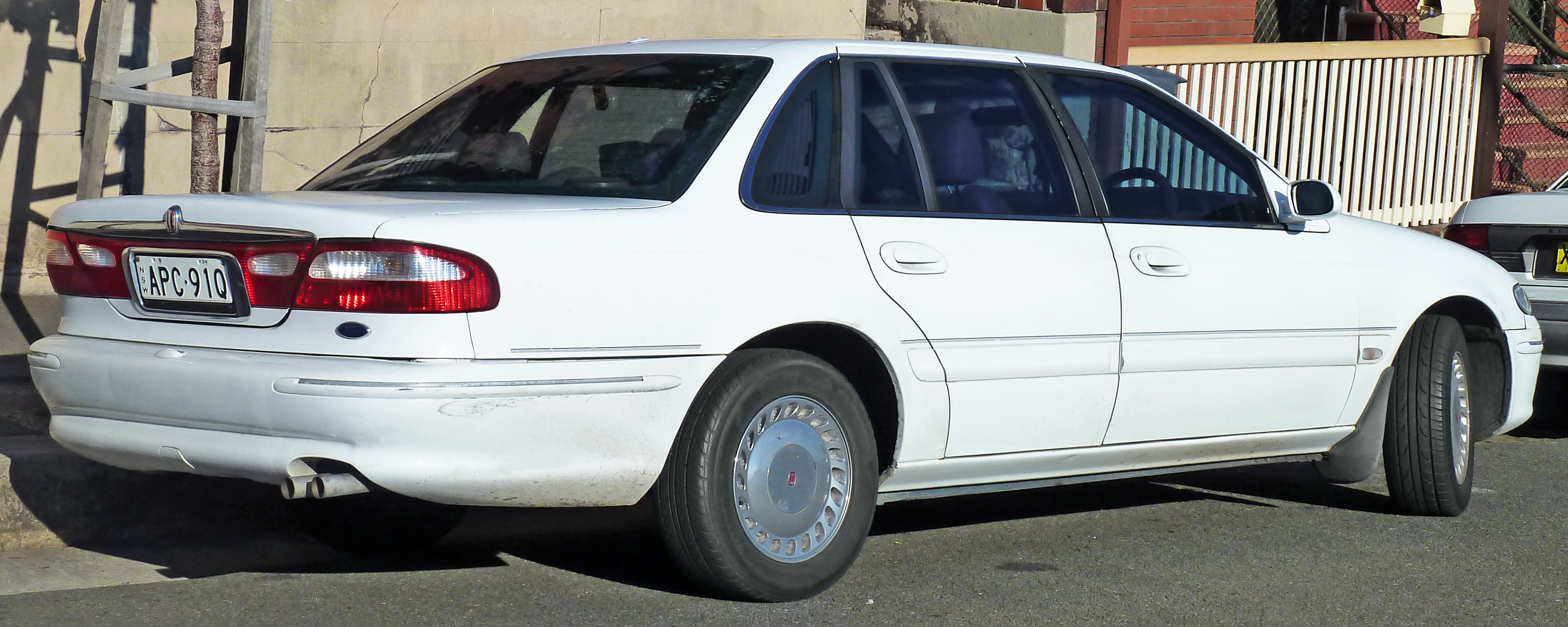
Ford Fairlane Ghia (NF; left) and Ford LTD (DF; right)

The Fairlane and LTD received a major front and rear restyle in March 1995 (EA77), coinciding with the EF Falcon, and remained on the same platform. The new NF Fairlanes and DF LTDs were longer and curvier, hiding their 1980s origins reasonably well. The exterior design was more ornamental compared to the relatively clean NAs to NCs. The Fairlane Sportsman reappeared for 1996, with the same formula as 1993, with the 4.0 L six.

==== NL / DL (1996–1999) ====
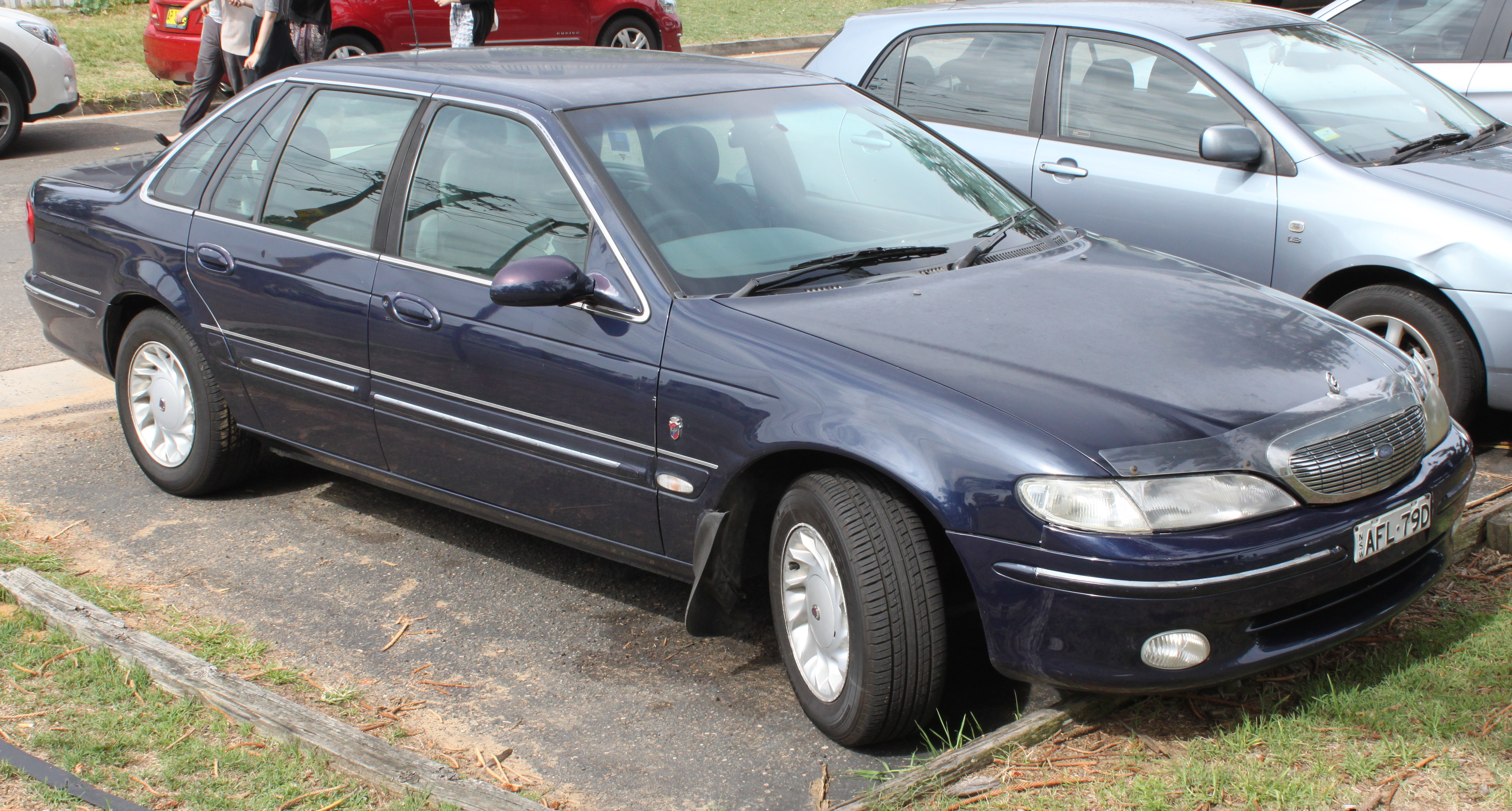
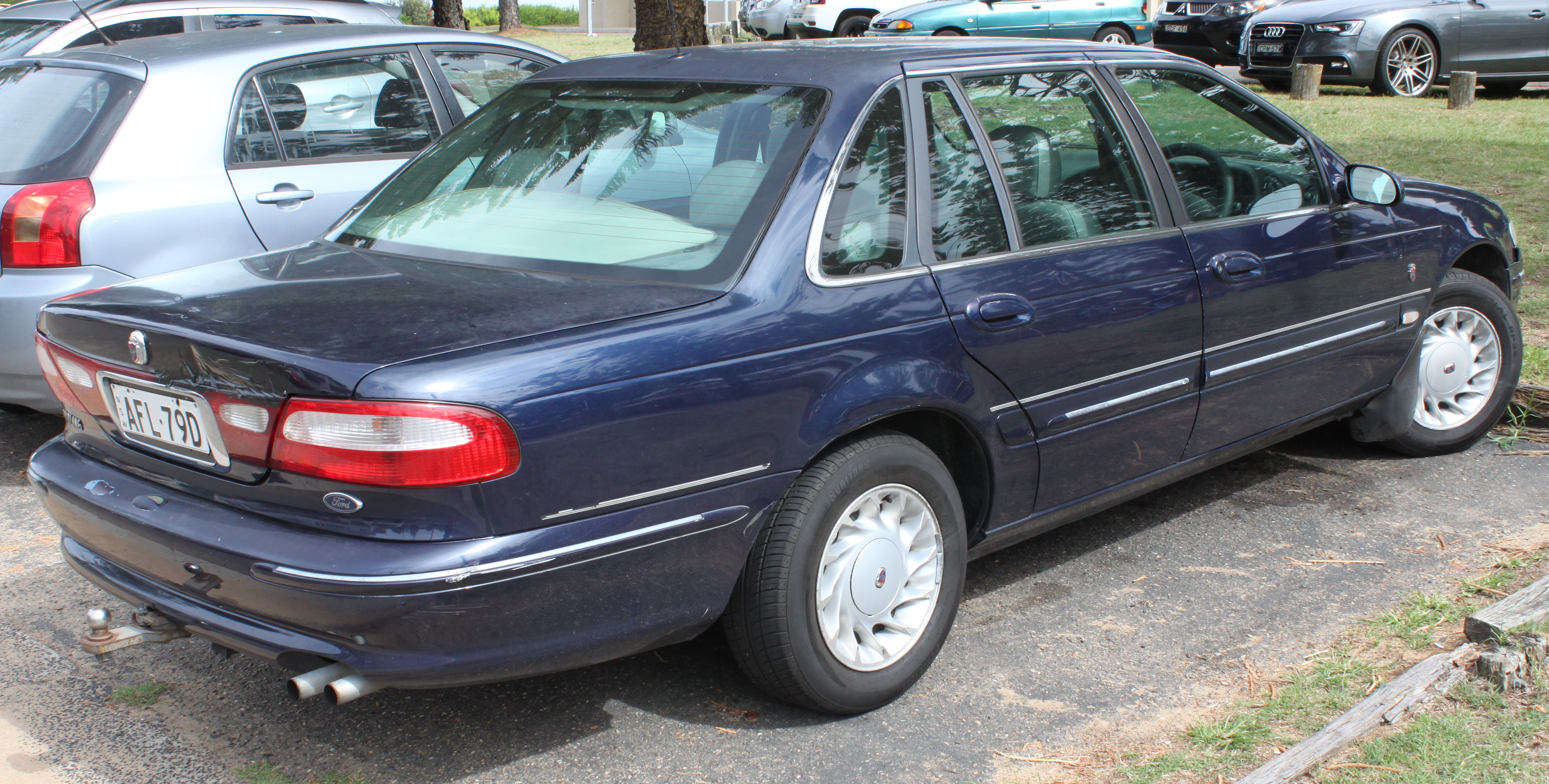
Ford Fairlane (NL) Ghia

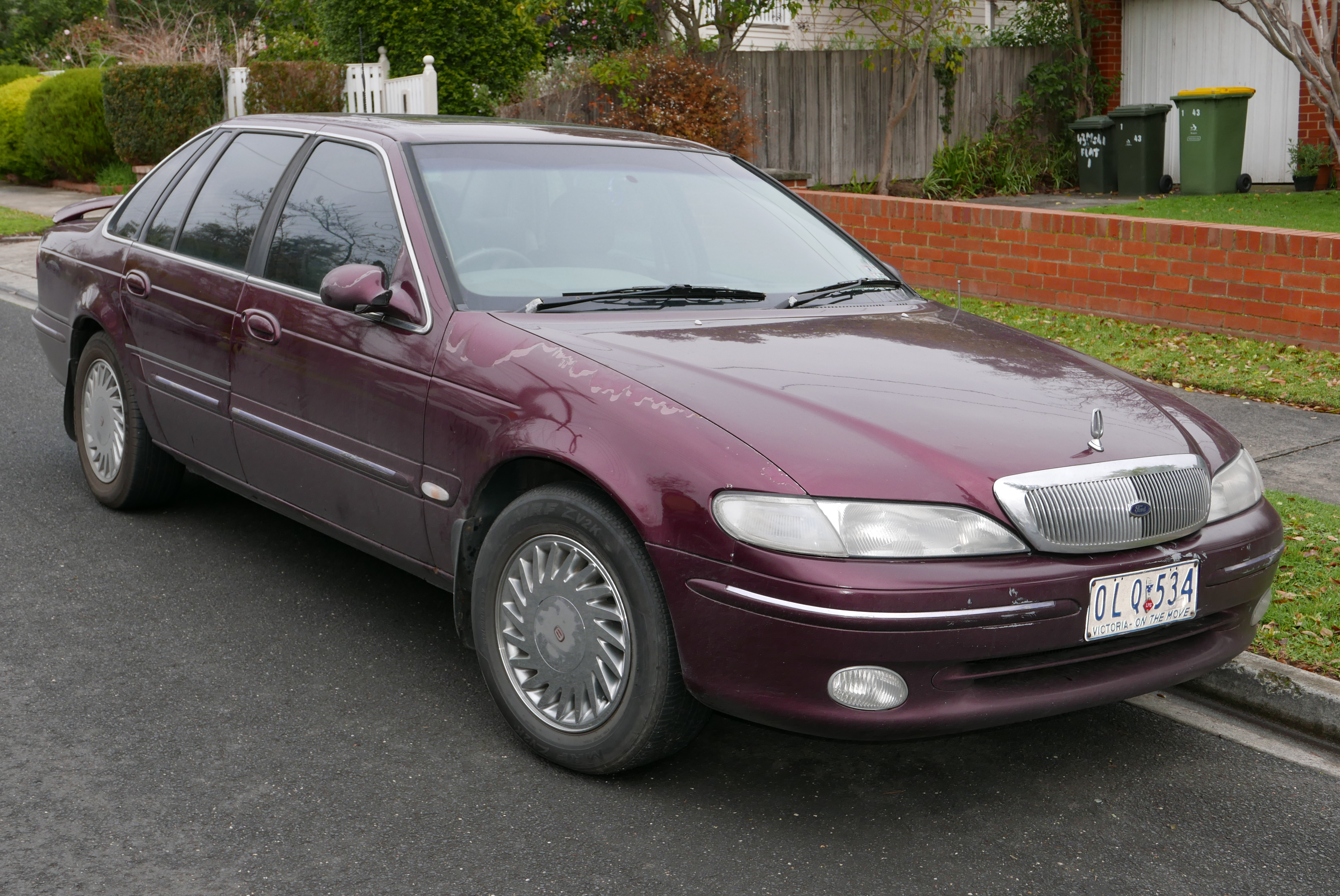
Ford LTD (DL)

In September 1996, the revised NL Fairlanes and DL LTDs appeared. In 1997, Ford introduced a higher Fairlane Concorde trim, with the same 4.0 and 5.0 L engine choices. No Sportsman variant of the Fairlane was offered.

For customers, five Dealer modified NL Series Fairlanes from Sydney and Melbourne utilised parts from the 5.0-litre Mustang Cobra and Australian delivered SVO parts due to the limited edition run of the Fairlane by Tickford and customers wanting to maintain the Luxury look but sport the GT's performance. The rounded body lines were reminiscent of the US-market Ford Taurus, while the front end styling was similar to the Lincoln Town Car.

Ford expanded the Fairlane range greatly in 1998. Beginning with the Ghia, also a basic Concorde (six-cylinder) and Concorde Ghia (V8) were offered. A Tickford-modified version was also available, with the larger engine.

The NL and DL series were the last models to come equipped with automatic self-leveling rear suspension.

The New Zealand Government also used the NL Fairlane Ghia as their designated Crown Limousines. Crown Fairlanes have mostly painted Amaretto (a few in white) and were fitted with silver "Concorde" 16 inch wheels, 6 disc cd stacker, electric adjust drivers seat and New Zealand fitted flag pole mounts on the front guards.

All of the Fairlane Ghias used by the New Zealand Government were fitted with the factory 4.0 L six-cylinder engine producing 165kw. The LTD was also used with a few being V8 models. The LTD Crown Cars were a range of colours including Dynamic White, Argon Silver, Mocha Foam and Amaretto in the facelift.

The NL and DL Crown cars all sported special government only licence plates starting with CR404 in 1997 and continuing in numerical order to CR437 in 1998. Most crown cars were retired after three years of service. The Fairlane and LTD had been used by the New Zealand Government since the 1970s through to 2010s where the Ford brand was replaced with BMW 7-Series.

The New Zealand Government still uses CR registration plates on their current Crown Cars.

Harry Hutton (son of Mark Hutton) is known to drive a 1999 Ford Fairlane GHIA.

=== Fifth generation ===
==== AU (1999–2003) ====
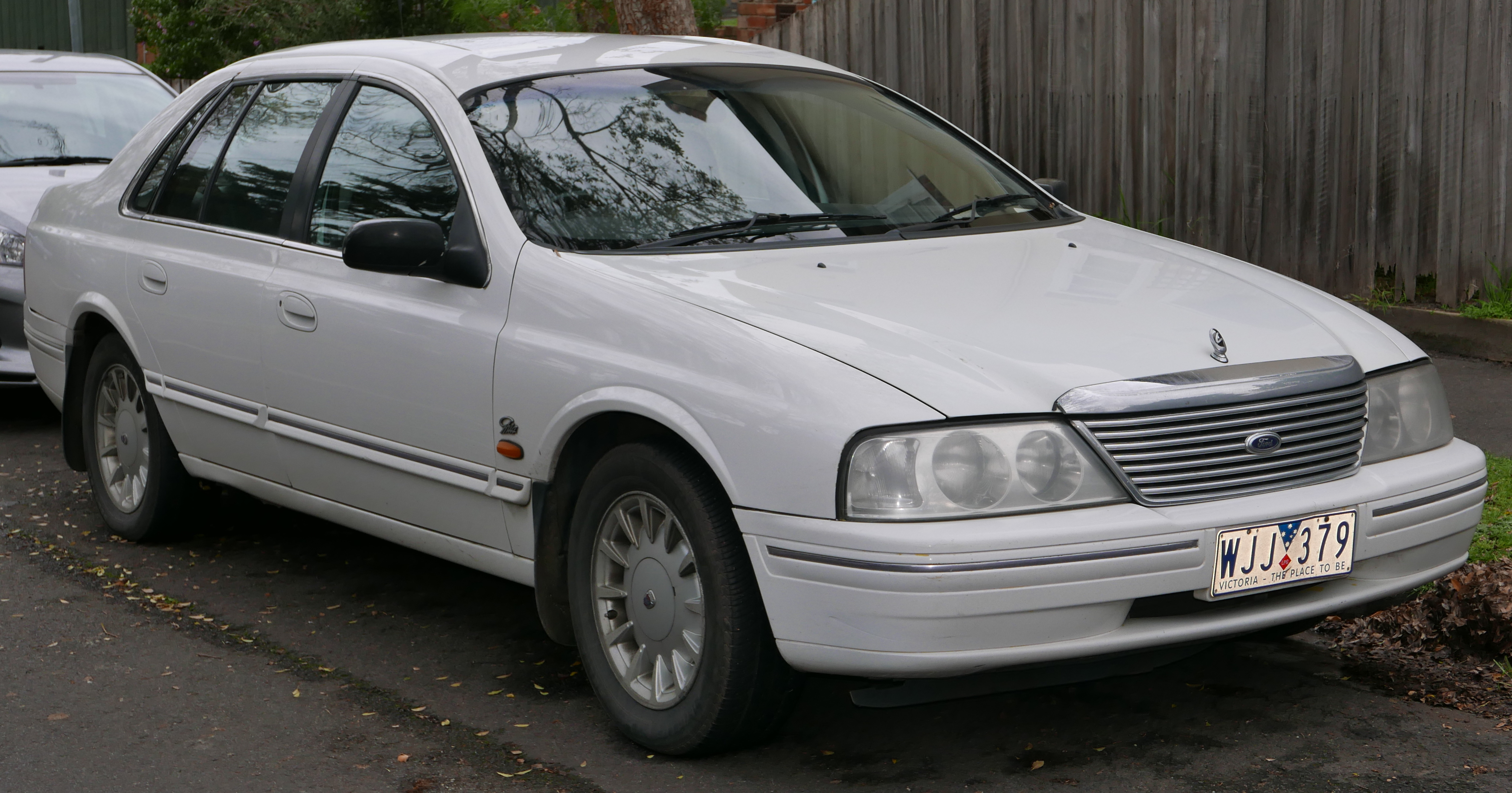
Ford Fairlane (AU II) Ghia

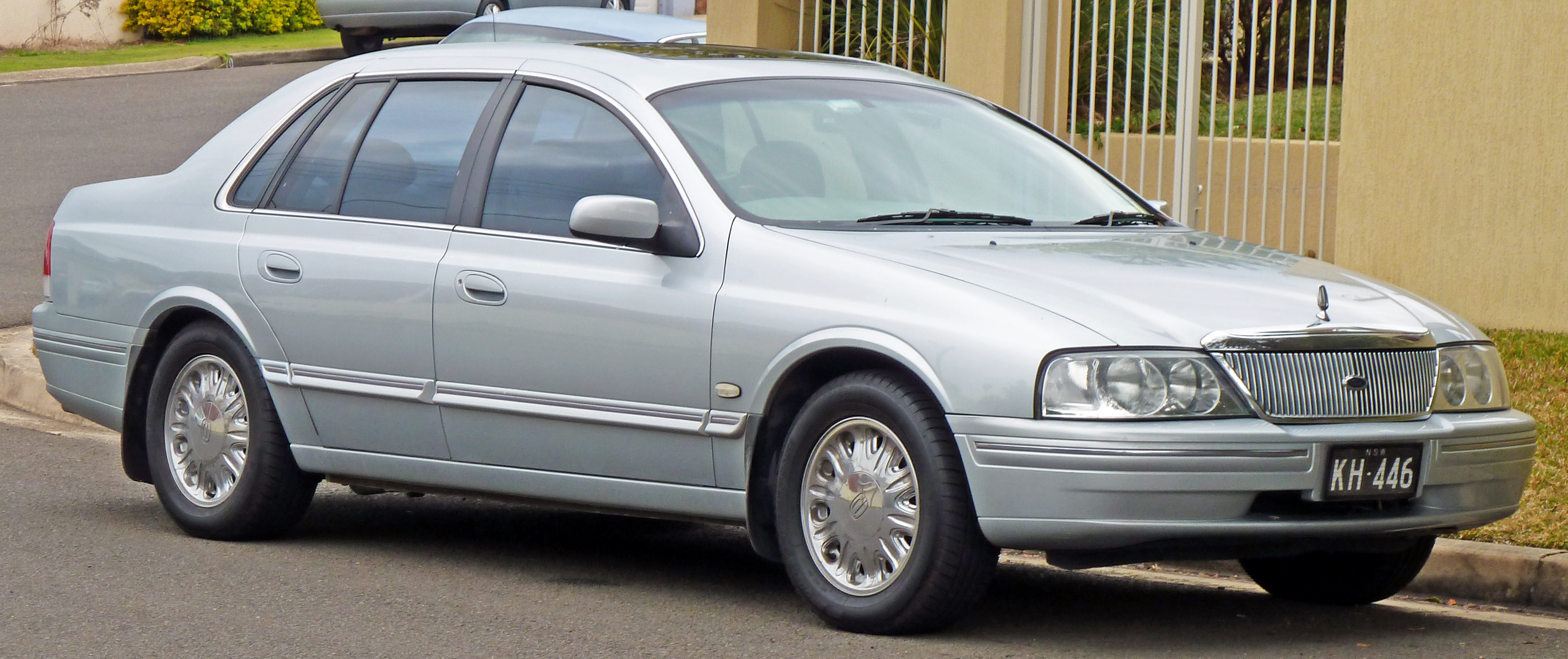
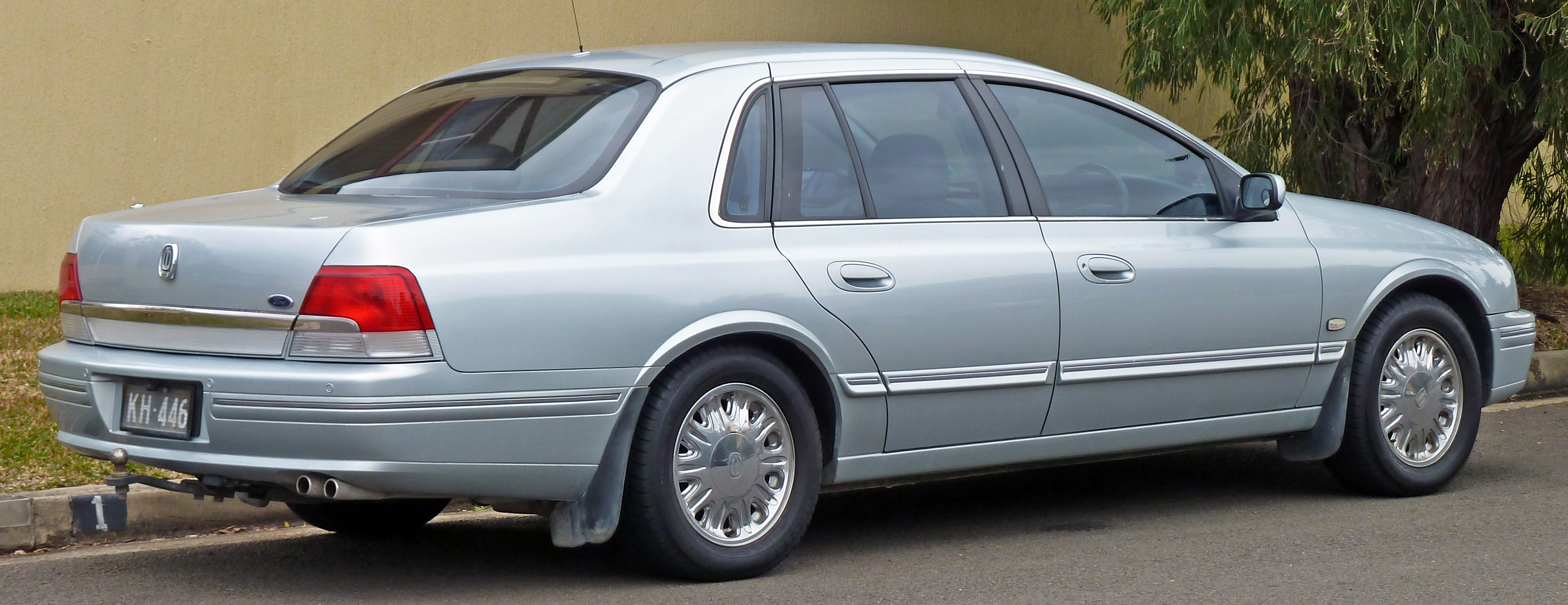
2000–2003 Ford LTD (AU II)

Ford introduced its "New Edge" look to the AU series Fairlane in February 1999. The EA169 platform was somewhat of a flop and allowed rival Holden to overtake the company in the sales of full-sized cars. The AU LTD was released three months later, in May.

The AU Fairlane and LTD models were the first long-wheelbase sedans to share a model code with the AU Falcon (the model code is not NU as people mistakenly assume). They had Lincoln Town Car-styling cues, especially around the C-pillar. The range was pared back to just two models, the Fairlane Ghia and the LTD, although a limited-edition Fairlane Millennium Ghia was also offered in January 2000. The flagship LTD model was exported to Fiji and to its traditional export market, New Zealand. A small number of LTDs were exported to the United Kingdom, where they were converted into hearses and limousines.

A high-performance variant of the AU Fairlane was released in 1999 as the FTE TL50. Ford brought forward revisions to the Falcon and Fairlane ranges when market acceptance of the new cars proved poor in July 2000. The 2001 model year AU II models featured some improvements, and another limited edition was offered: the 75th Anniversary Ghia in October, with the same engine choices as before. The Sportsman Ghia was revived in March 2001 and lasted for more than one model year this time, remaining in the range to the end of 2002. The Sportsman Ghia featured the same Howe leather seats as the LTD, albeit without the embroidered LTD insignia.

==== BA (2003–2005) ====
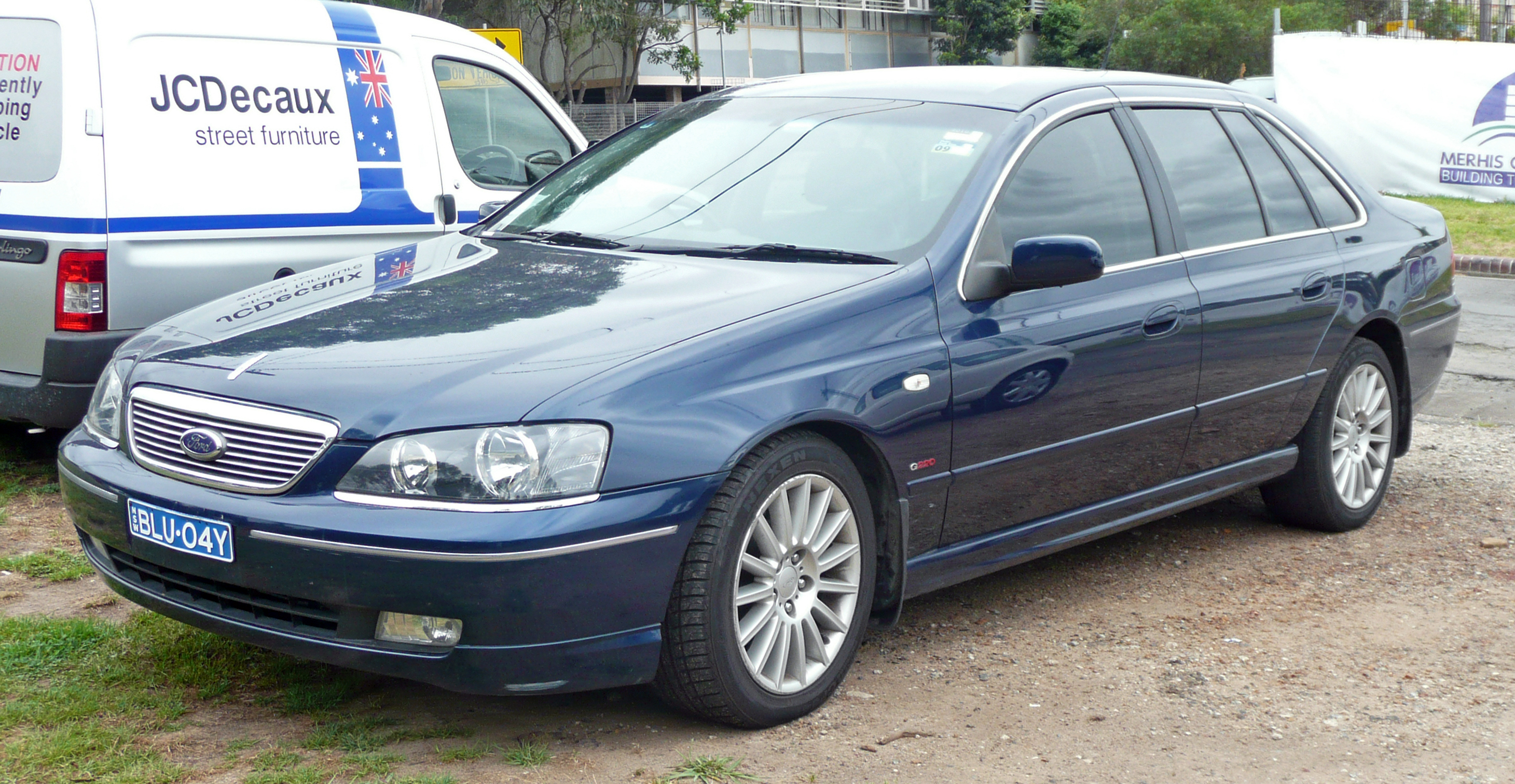
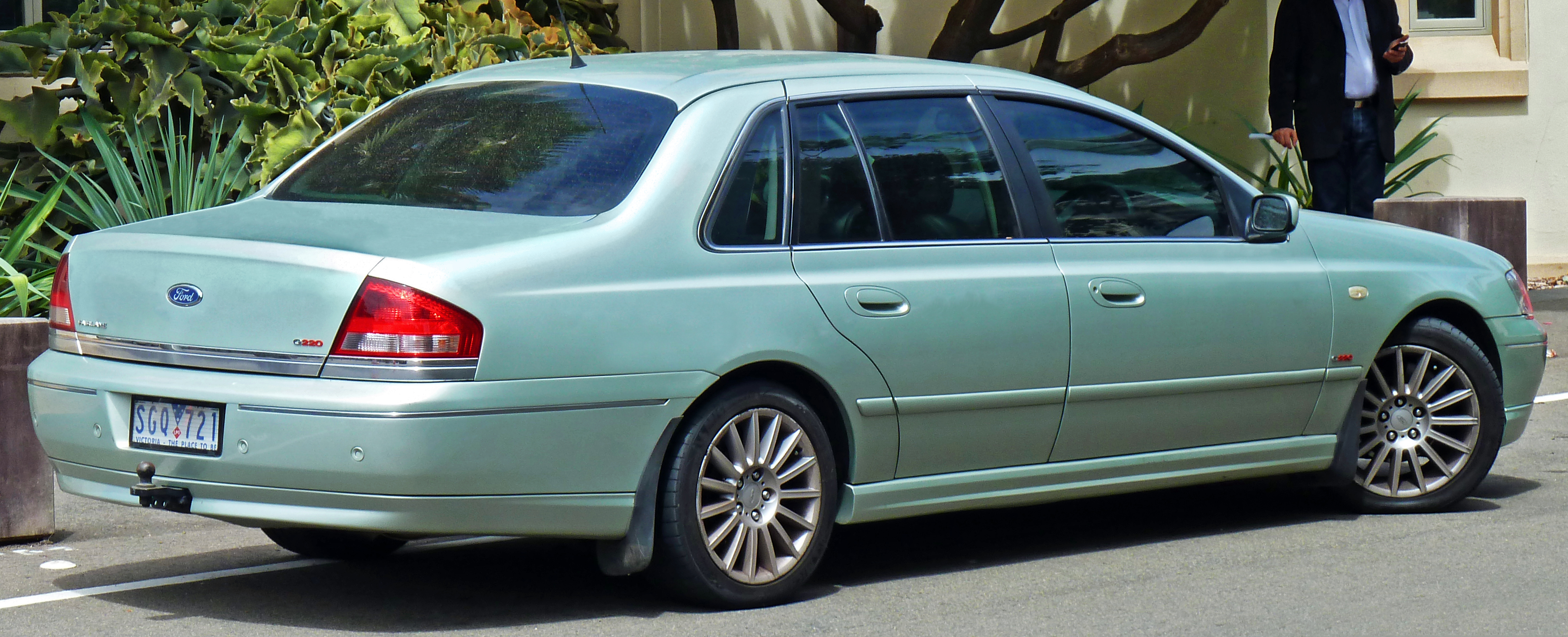
2003–2005 Ford Fairlane (BA) G220

Ford's new attempt to battle Holden came in July 2003 with the BA series. The BA Fairlanes and LTDs were closer to the BA Falcon in looks, even sharing the taillights. The 5.0-litre engine gave way to the larger, three-valve, 5.4-litre Modular V8. This engine, a derivative of the Ford Triton engine, was known in Australia as the Barra 220. From this point, the LTD was no longer offered with a six-cylinder engine.

To capture younger buyers, the Fairlane G220 (denoting its 220 kilowatts [295 hp] power output at 4,750 rpm and 472 N⋅m [348 lb⋅ft] of torque from 3,250–4,000 rpm) took the place of the Fairlane Sportsman, and featured the larger engine only. The traditional automatic gearbox was replaced by a sequential automatic. Unique to the G220 were 17-inch Elegance alloy wheels, ebony headlight bezels with unique lens, and redline leather seats with warm charcoal, perforated leather inserts.

The Fairlane Ghia continued as the six-cylinder base model, but came standard with colour ICC screen, a six-CD stack, 11-speaker Premium Sound, 7-way adjustable leather seats, and woodgrain inserts. Cornering lights below the headlights in the front bumper, appear to have been installed from late 2003 onward and were not installed on early cars.

The LTD was further distinguished from the Ghia by having the 5.4 L V8 engine, Webasto Hollandia 700 sunroof, 17-inch alloy wheels, LTD bonnet and boot badging, 10-way adjustable front seats, bolstered rear seats, satellite navigation, electrochromic auto-dimming rear-vision mirror, LTD etched and tinted rear quarter windows and a unique vertical bar grille.

Ford reused the AU Sportsman Ghia wheel centre design for the BA LTD Series I and simply replaced the centre badge insert. The electrochromic rear vision mirror fitted to the LTD, was the same as that used in the Ford Territory Ghia.

The sunroof which was standard equipment on the LTD, could be optionally exchanged for a REX (Rear Entertainment Xtreme) DVD System or deleted entirely, as was often the case on vehicles destined for funeral service use. The Webasto Hollandia 700 sunroof was also installed to a number of other Australian cars at the time - notably the Holden Commodore, and parts between the sunroofs such as the control buttons and motors are often interchangeable.

The LTD gear shifter design along with the accompanying woodgrain dash inserts and door spears, were of a colour specific to the LTD.

Brakes were the same as on the Falcon, with Fairlanes coming standard with electronic brakeforce distribution and traction control.

Sources vary, with a total of between 332 and 347 BA Series 1 LTD's listed as having been manufactured by Ford.

Following Ford Australia's introduction of the BA II Falcon in October 2004, facelifted versions of the Fairlane Ghia, Fairlane G220, and LTD were introduced in March 2005. The changes which were mainly cosmetic, but nevertheless significant, were carried over in the subsequent BF model ranges. The facelifted Fairlane was headlined by a more heavily chromed exterior, including chrome rub strips, a new chromed rear appliqué, chromed wheel centres and on Fairlane Ghia and LTD, chromed wing mirror covers. The G220 was given new-design seven-spoke alloy wheels, while Fairlane Ghia and LTD added two-toned paint to their side skirts and lower valances.

For the BA II interior, the black leather seats and leather section of the door trims were replaced with new leather trim dubbed China Beige. The Ghia and G220 gained an eight-way power driver’s seat with memory function. The G220 was given a leather-wrapped sports steering wheel, and the Ghia a Rhui Maple woodgrain and leather steering wheel, and the LTD gained a Stone Maple woodgrain and leather steering wheel.

While the only BA II mechanical change was the addition of Sports Control Blade rear-suspension tune for the base Ghia and flagship LTD, a REX (Option 9A, Rear Entertainment Xtreme) DVD entertainment system became the standard for the LTD, exchangeable for a sunroof.

A total of 121 BA II LTD's are listed as having been manufactured by Ford.

An interior upgrade that would be carried over in its entirety to the subsequent BF range was the change from black to brushed silver instrument dials and dash clock, and the silver shifter surround, centre cup holder, and ICC fascia became "piano black" with the ICC buttons changed accordingly from black to silver. Chrome door handles, vent tips, and door lock barrels were also added. The original woodgrain trim was retained until the BF.

==== BF (2005–2007) ====
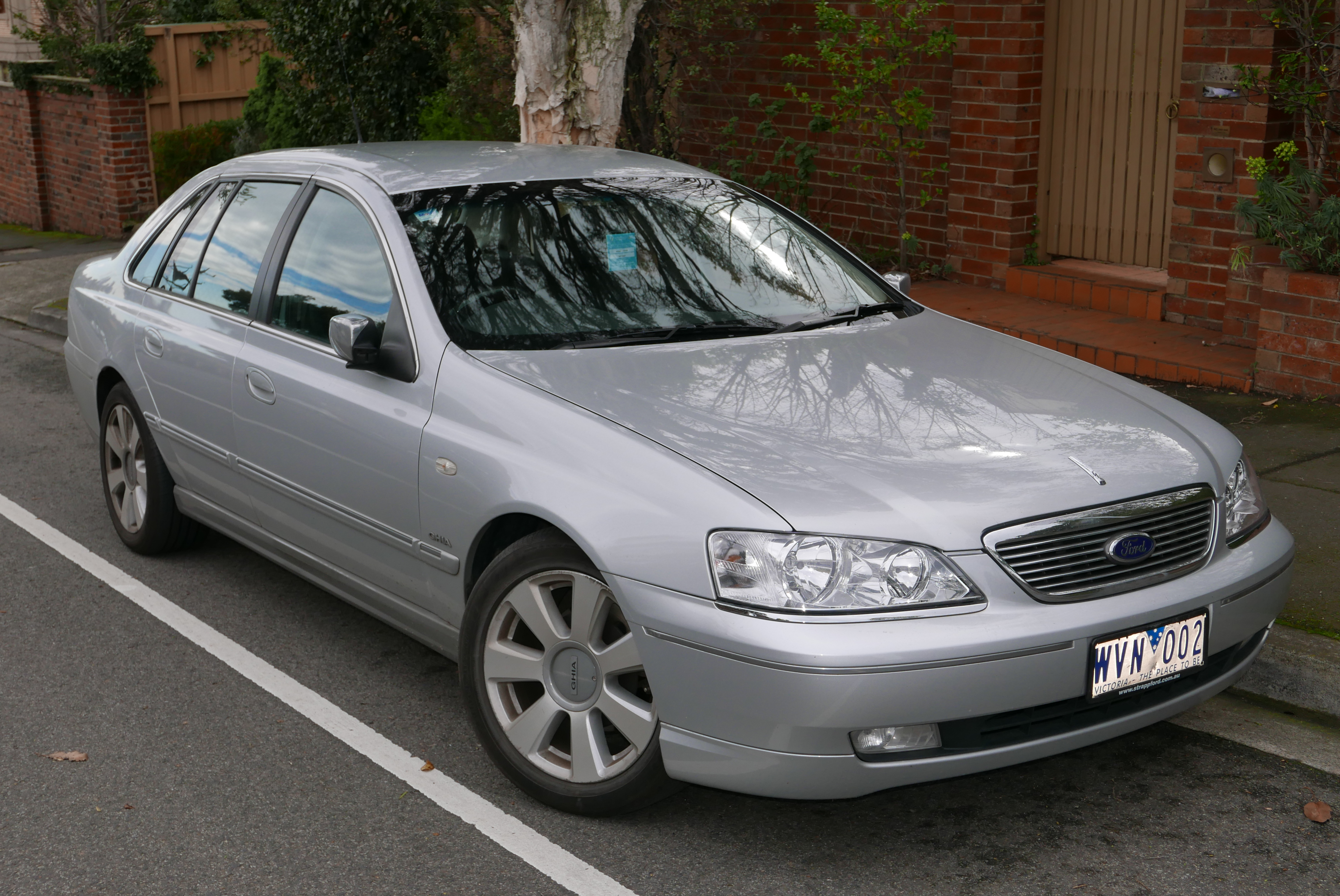
2005–2007 Ford Fairlane (BF) Ghia

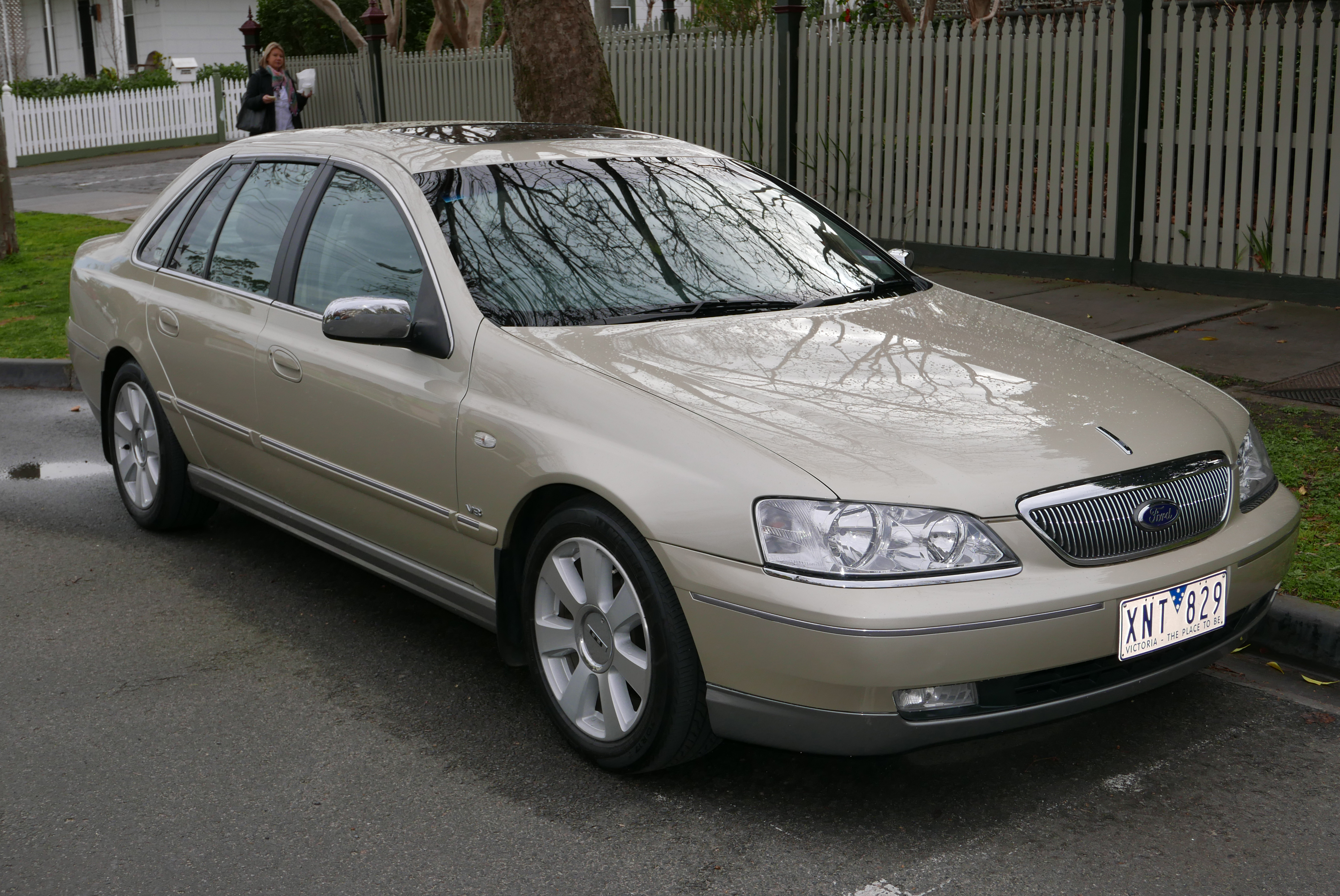
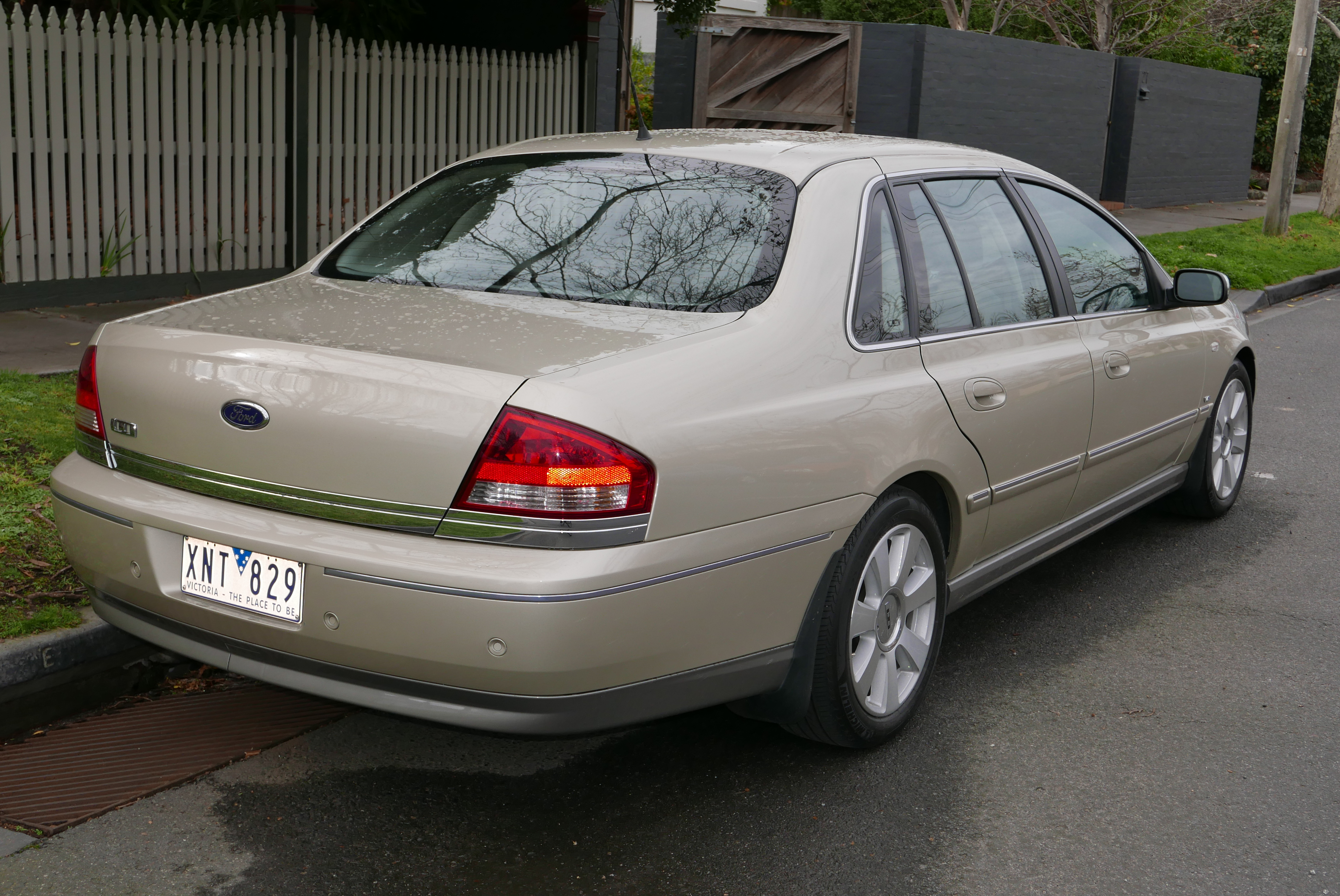
2005–2007 Ford LTD (BF)

The BF series Fairlane and LTD models were introduced in October 2005, with the Fairlane G220 renamed the Fairlane G8. Externally, the BF was outwardly identical to the BA Mark II, but fine-tunings to steering, suspension, soundproofing and undercarriage were made. The fuel economy was also improved. Across the whole BF range, the taillight lenses were slightly changed in appearance. The Ghia went from 16-inch to 17-inch alloy wheels as standard.

Interior-wise, the only changes from the upgrades introduced in the BA Mark II were the replacement of the woodgrain inserts with "satin chrome" inserts. This colour scheme was the same for all BF Fairlane variants. The BF Ghia and LTD came with black leather seats or China beige leather seats with an eight-way adjustable drivers seat and six-way adjustable passenger seat.

The G8 featured an eight-cylinder engine with the improved exhaust system and an additional knock sensor, producing 230 kilowatts (308 hp) at 5,350 rpm and 500 N⋅m (369 lb⋅ft) of torque at 3,500 rpm. It was equipped with a six-speed ZF sports automatic transmission and 2.53:1 (and not for 2.73:1 as some would mistake it) nonlimited-slip final differential ratio. The G8 was distinguished by its 17-inch five-spoke alloy wheels with its firmer suspension and lower profile (225/50) tyres, 'Redline' leather seats with warm charcoal perforated-leather inserts, perforated leather-wrapped steering wheel with brushed aluminium-style inserts, perforated leather-wrapped gearshift with satin inserts, and ebony headlight bezels.

In addition to having the V8 engine, the LTD featured 17-inch seven-spoke alloy wheels, satellite navigation, ten-way power-adjustable front seats with driver's seat memory settings, bolstered rear seats, rear-seat DVD player and monitor, front fog lights, a power sunroof, electrochromic (auto-dimming) rear view mirror, a Stone Maple woodgrain and leather-wrapped steering wheel, embroidered floor mats, woodgrain gear shift, and Rabbit Rose woodgrain finishes.

In May 2007, it was announced that production of the Fairlane and LTD would cease as a decline in sales in its market segment rendered continued production of long-wheelbase models unsustainable. The last Fairlane was produced on 13 December 2007.

A total of 153 BF LTD's are listed as having been manufactured by Ford.

== Australian sales figures ==
Sales in Australia
Variant	1990	1991	1992	1993	1994	1995	1996	1997	1998	1999
Fairlane		3,762	3,908	4,206	3,219	5,144	4,145	4,100	3,097	4,487
LTD		459	533	544	376	816	568	419	330	320
Variant	2000	2001	2002	2003	2004	2005	2006	2007	2008	2009
Fairlane	2,779	2,306	2,001	2,389	2,016	1,829	1,105	1,703	114	13
LTD	297	149	100	146	174	151	53	77	2	
