= Ford Falcon (Australia) =

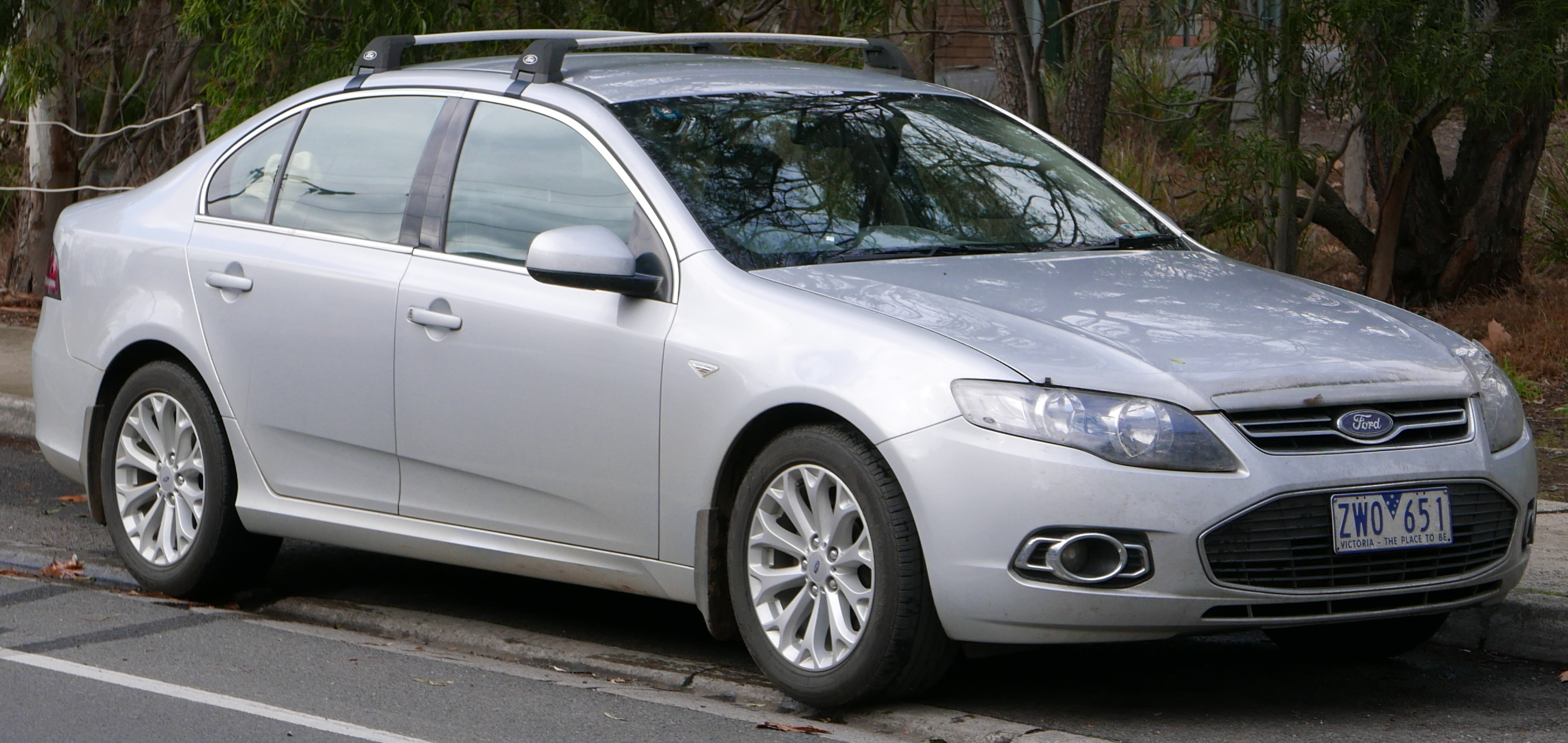
- 2013 Falcon FG II G6

Overview
- Manufacturer: Ford Australia
- Also called: Ford Fairmont; Ford Futura
- Production: 1960–2016 (3,578,689 units produced)
- Assembly: Australia: Broadmeadows, Melbourne, Victoria; New Zealand: Lower Hutt, Wellington (1960s–1973); Wiri, Auckland (1973–1990s)

Body and chassis
- Class: Mid-size (1960–1966); Full-size (1966–2016)
- Body style: 4-door sedan 5-door station wagon 2-door utility 2-door panel van 2-door coupé
- Layout: FR layout
- Related: Ford Fairlane/LTD; Ford Territory

Chronology
- Predecessor: Ford Zephyr; Ford Zodiac
- Successor: Ford Mondeo (for sedan); Ford Endura (station wagon); Ford Ranger (for Ute)

The Ford Falcon is a full-size car that was manufactured by Ford Australia from 1960 to 2016. From the XA series of 1972 onward, each Falcon and range of derivates have been designed, developed, and built in Australia, following the phasing out of the American-influenced Falcon of 1960 to 1971, which had been re-engineered locally as the XK to XY series for the harsher Australian conditions. The luxury-oriented Ford Fairmont model joined the range from 1965. Luxury long-wheelbase derivative versions called the Ford Fairlane and LTD arrived in 1967 and 1973 respectively with production ending in 2007.

Over 3 million Ford Falcons and its derivatives were made over seven generations to 2016, almost exclusively in Australia and New Zealand, but also South Africa and some RHD Asian markets. Along with its closest rival, the Holden Commodore that was also Australian-made, the Falcon once dominated the fleets of taxis in Australia and New Zealand, as well as police and company fleets.

In its last incarnation as the FG X series, the body style of the Falcon range consisted of sedan and utility body styles. Luxury variants of the current model Falcon, collectively known as the G Series, were marketed as the Ford G6, G6 E, and G6 E Turbo, which replaced the long-standing Fairmont and Fairmont Ghia models. Previously the Falcon range also included a hardtop coupé, panel van and station wagon (respectively up to 1978, 1999 and 2010)., as well as the Futura variant. The Falcon platform had also spawned luxury models such as the Landau coupe and long-wheelbase Fairlane and LTD sedans.

In May 2013, Ford Australia announced the end of local production, which consisted of Falcon and its closely related Territory crossover SUV, by October 2016. This decision was attributable to Ford Motor Company's "One Ford" product development plan introduced in 2008 to rationalise its global range. Under this plan, Falcon's indirect replacements are the fourth-generation Mondeo from Europe and the sixth-generation Mustang from North America, the latter to retain Ford's Australian V8 heritage. The final Ford Falcon, a blue XR6, rolled off the production line on 7 October 2016.

== History ==
During the 1950s, Ford's Australian sales were faltering due to the popularity of Holden, which did not have an effective competitor. Ford assembled the British Zephyr and its Consul and Zodiac derivatives. However, while these cars were moderately successful and had a good reputation, Ford could not match Holden's price, so sales suffered. One of the reasons for the price difference was the higher cost of imported parts, which were subject to an import tariff. Ford also assembled Canadian-sourced Ford V8 models, but these cars were in a higher price category, putting them out of reach of the average buyer.

Hence, Ford decided to commence local production of a Holden challenger. Initially, they intended to produce the Zephyr, Consul, and Zodiac, using expensive dies they would need to purchase from Ford of Britain. However, during a visit to Ford headquarters in Detroit in 1958, they were shown the new Falcon, which was being prepared for its United States launch. Immediately, the executives were attracted to the new car- it was about the same size as Holden, but it was low, long, wide and modern. The width allowed it to accommodate six people, and a two-speed automatic transmission was available. Besides all this, Ford Australia felt they had more experience building North American cars. Hence, they decided to make Falcon their new Australian car. In 1959, Ford built the Broadmeadows Assembly Plant at Campbellfield, a suburb of Melbourne, for local production of the North American Ford Falcon. The factory was designed in Canada, and had a roof designed for Canadian snow falls, which is needed in Melbourne due to the occurrence of heavy hail falls in the Australian south east and east coast areas.

== First generation (1960–1966) ==
=== XK ===
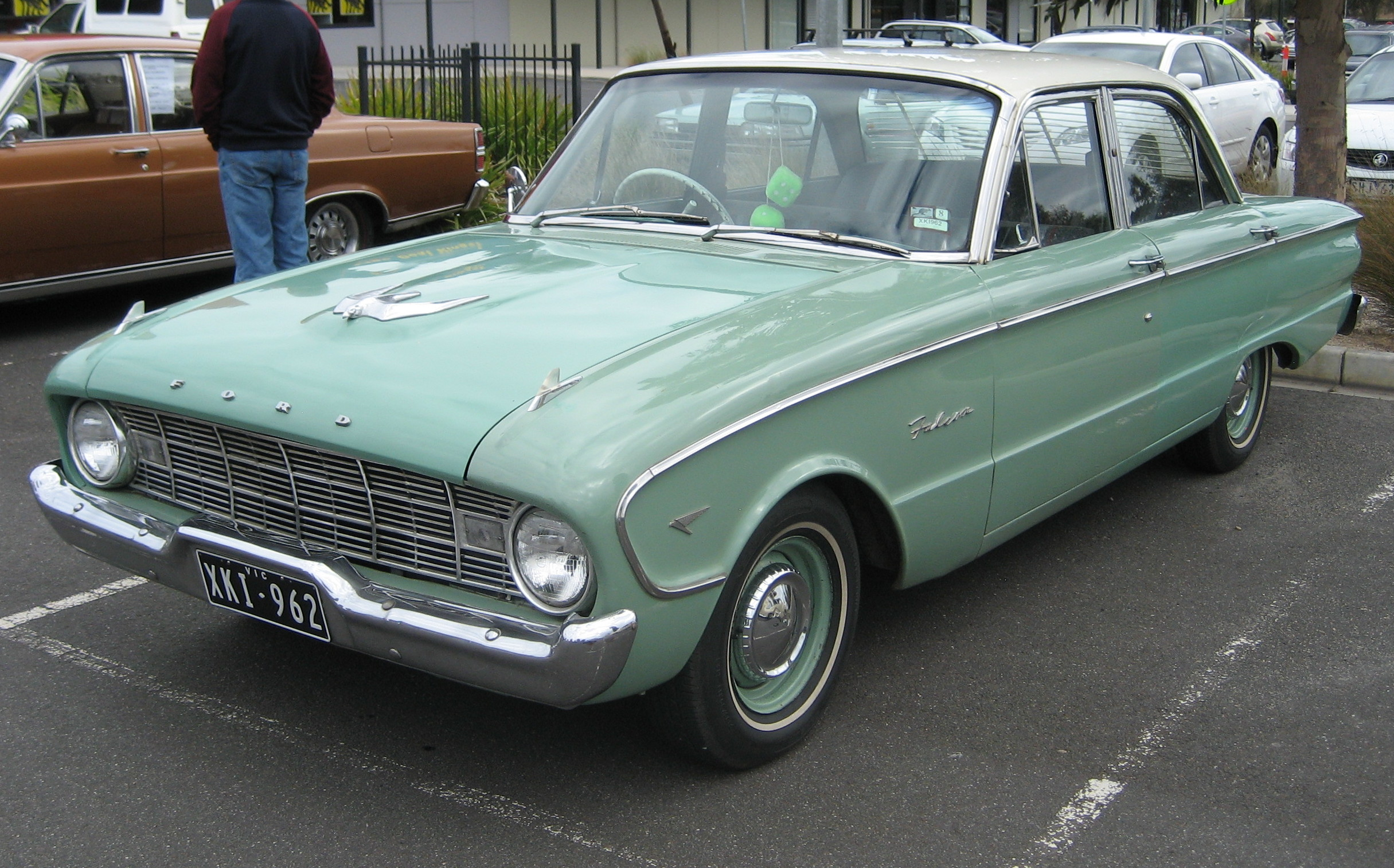
Falcon XK sedan

The first Falcon sold in Australia was the XK series, introduced in September 1960. It was initially offered only as a four-door sedan, in both Falcon and Falcon Deluxe trim levels. The XK was essentially a right-hand drive version of the North American model, although dealerships in Australia’s rural areas often included modifications such as heavy-duty rear suspension (five leaves) and larger, 6.40 by 13-inch (16 by 33 centimetre), tyres.

The steering was light and the ride surprisingly good, on well-paved roads. The Falcon's "king-size" drum brakes actually had less lining area than the Zephyr's, but they were stopping a car that was more than 100 kilograms (220 lb) lighter, and so were adequate. Whereas the North American model used an "economy" 3.10 to 1 rear-axle ratio, the XK’s axle had a 3.56 to 1 ratio, which better complemented the torque characteristics of the engine, yet still allowed a reduction in cruising rpm when compared with the Zephyr.

The station wagon, added to the range in November 1960, had a shorter rear overhang (the length of the body from the rear wheels to the back of the vehicle) than the American version, due to concern that the back of the car might scrape on rough roads and spoon drains.

Billed as being "Australian-with a world of difference", the Falcon offered the first serious alternative to Holden, and became an instant success. Sales were aided by the contemporary FB-series Holden being perceived as lacklustre and dated by comparison. (The FB had a similar appearance to mid-1950s American cars and a 138-cubic-inch (2.3 L) engine with only a manual transmission available, whereas the XK had a higher-power 144-cubic-inch (2.4 L) engine, with buyers able to select one of four different combinations – engines of two different compression ratios and an automatic or manual transmission.)

However, before long, XK sales suffered from complaints about the [car’s] durability on rough outback roads, due chiefly to collapsing front ball joints, and adjusting shims dropping out of the front suspension, both problems inducing some rather severe front camber; the car earned the unflattering nicknames "foul can" or "fault can" during this time.

The XK range was expanded in May 1961 with the addition of utility and panel van body styles, officially designated the Falcon utility and Falcon sedan delivery, respectively. An optional 170-cubic-inch (2.8 L) engine was introduced late in the model's life, again in low- or high-compression versions.

=== XL ===
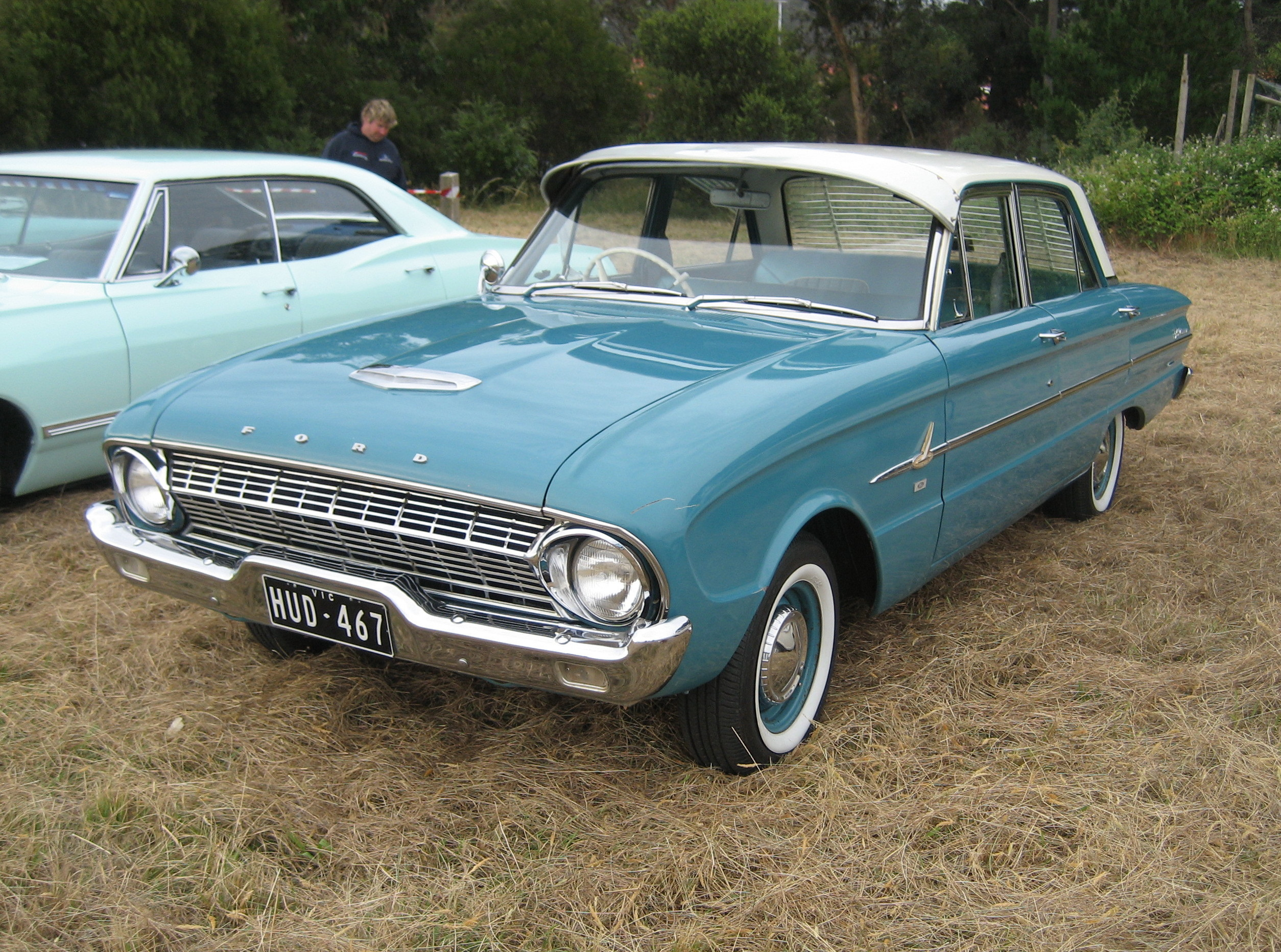
Falcon Deluxe sedan (XL)

Ford Australia introduced some local design changes to the XL in early 1962, such as a heavier suspension system with components from the Fairlane. Also, the appearance was changed with a new Thunderbird roofline. The slogan was "Trim, Taut, Terrific". Nevertheless, the Falcon was still widely perceived as unsuitable for local conditions and sales stagnated. Ford stuck with the Falcon and sales gradually increased over the following years as improvements to durability and reliability were applied.

New for the XL series were the top-of-the-range Falcon Futura sedan and the Falcon Squire station wagon, the latter featuring simulated woodgrain exterior side and tailgate paneling.

=== XM ===
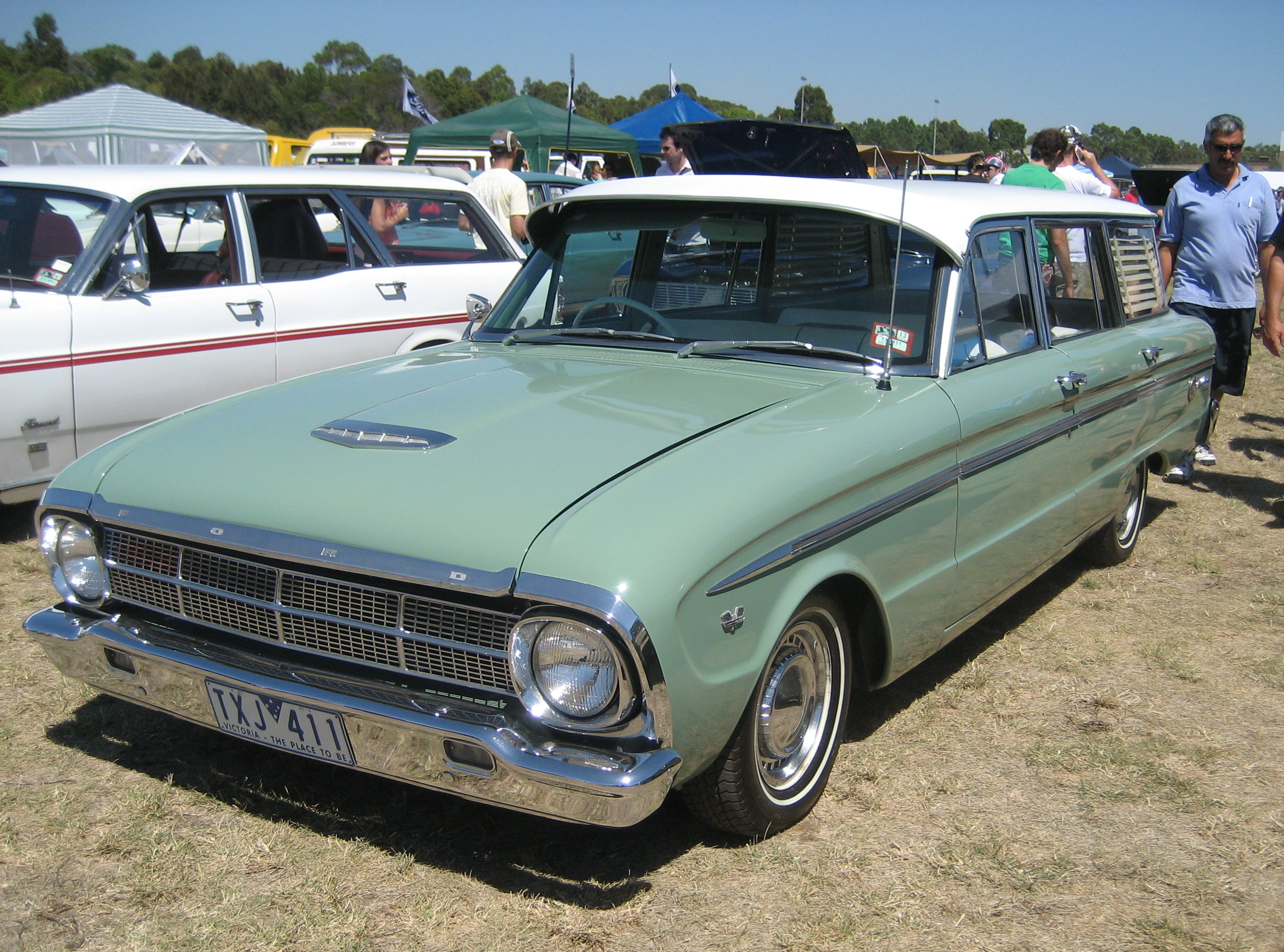
Falcon Deluxe station wagon (XM)

The XM, released in 1964, was the first Falcon with an Australian-designed body; the rear taillights were raised for Australian conditions and the front end received a full-wrap chrome grille and surrounds. The steering linkage was upgraded with 9/16 in tie rods instead of the 1/2 in tie rods found in the US models. The suspension was also improved with the upper control arms lowered to reduce the notorious bump steer found in the North American Falcon (and early Mustangs), on which this model was based. A coupé, in a two-door hardtop body style, was offered for the first time in both Falcon Deluxe and Falcon Futura trim levels.

=== XP ===
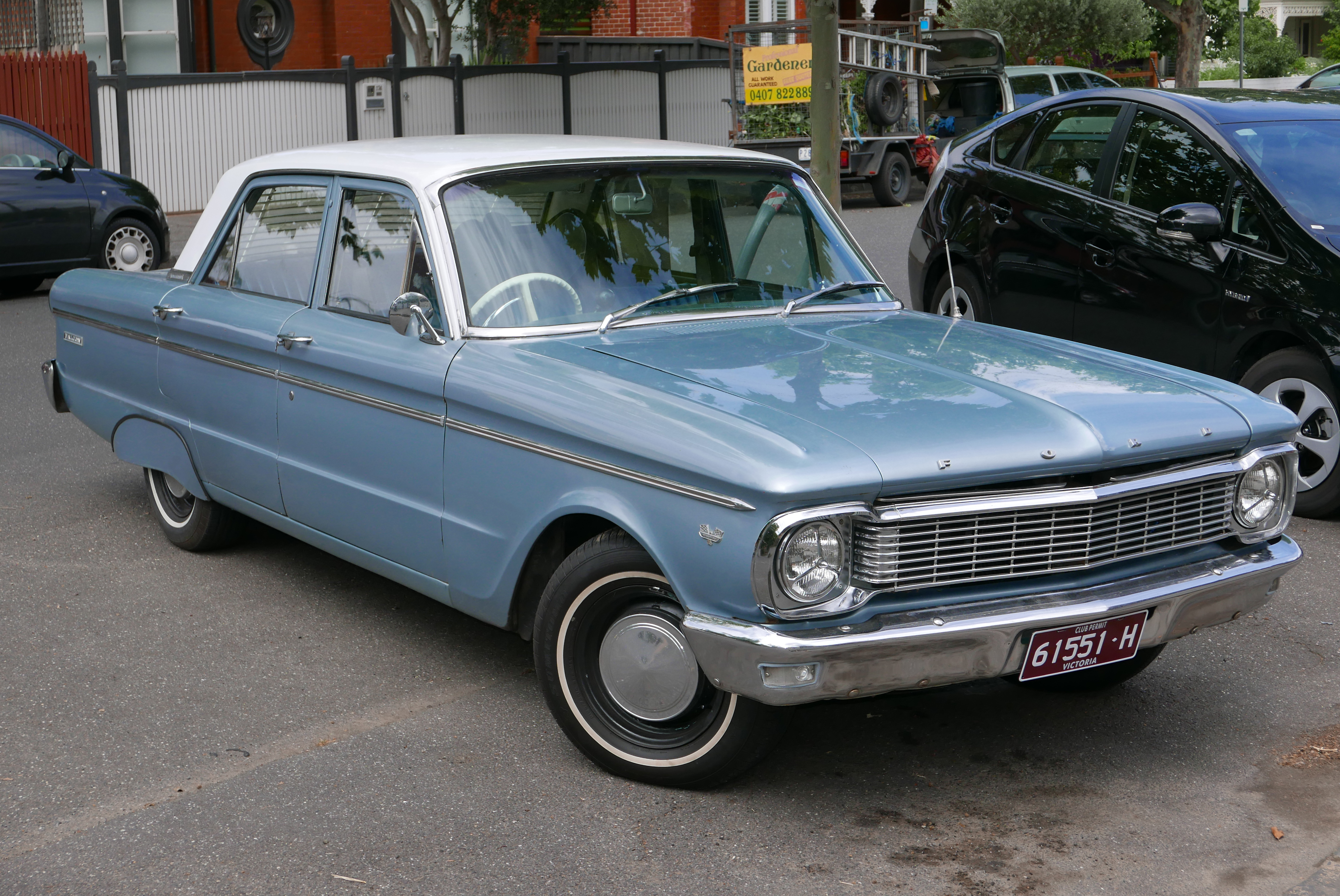
XP Falcon Deluxe sedan

The XP, released in 1965, saw the Fairmont introduced as an upmarket variant. The XP was the "make or break" Falcon: Ford's future in Australia depended on this car succeeding. Ford's deputy managing director Bill Bourke conceived a promotion for the new model which was a risk: demonstrate the XP's strength by mercilessly driving a fleet of XP Falcons around Ford's You-Yangs testing grounds for 70,000 mi (110,000 km) at over 70 mph (110 km/h). The gamble paid off with the Falcon winning the Wheels Car of the Year Award. A three-speed automatic progressively replaced the two-speed and front disc brakes were introduced as an option (standard on Fairmont and hardtop models).

This model was also the last to include the Squire range of Ford Falcons which featured wood panels on the side of the wagons, similar to the US-based station wagons. The Fairmont made its debut, midway through the model run, as the flagship of the XP Falcon range. It was offered in both sedan and station wagon body styles, replacing the Futura sedan and Squire wagon. Unlike later examples, the XP Fairmonts carried both Falcon and Fairmont badgework.

Additionally in the XP range, several cars were modified by Bill Warner to carry a 260- or 289 in^{3} V8 and a three-speed automatic or four-speed manual. These cars are discussed as precursors of the GT Falcon which debuted in the next model or as XP Falcon Sprints.

== Second generation (1966–1972) ==
=== XR ===
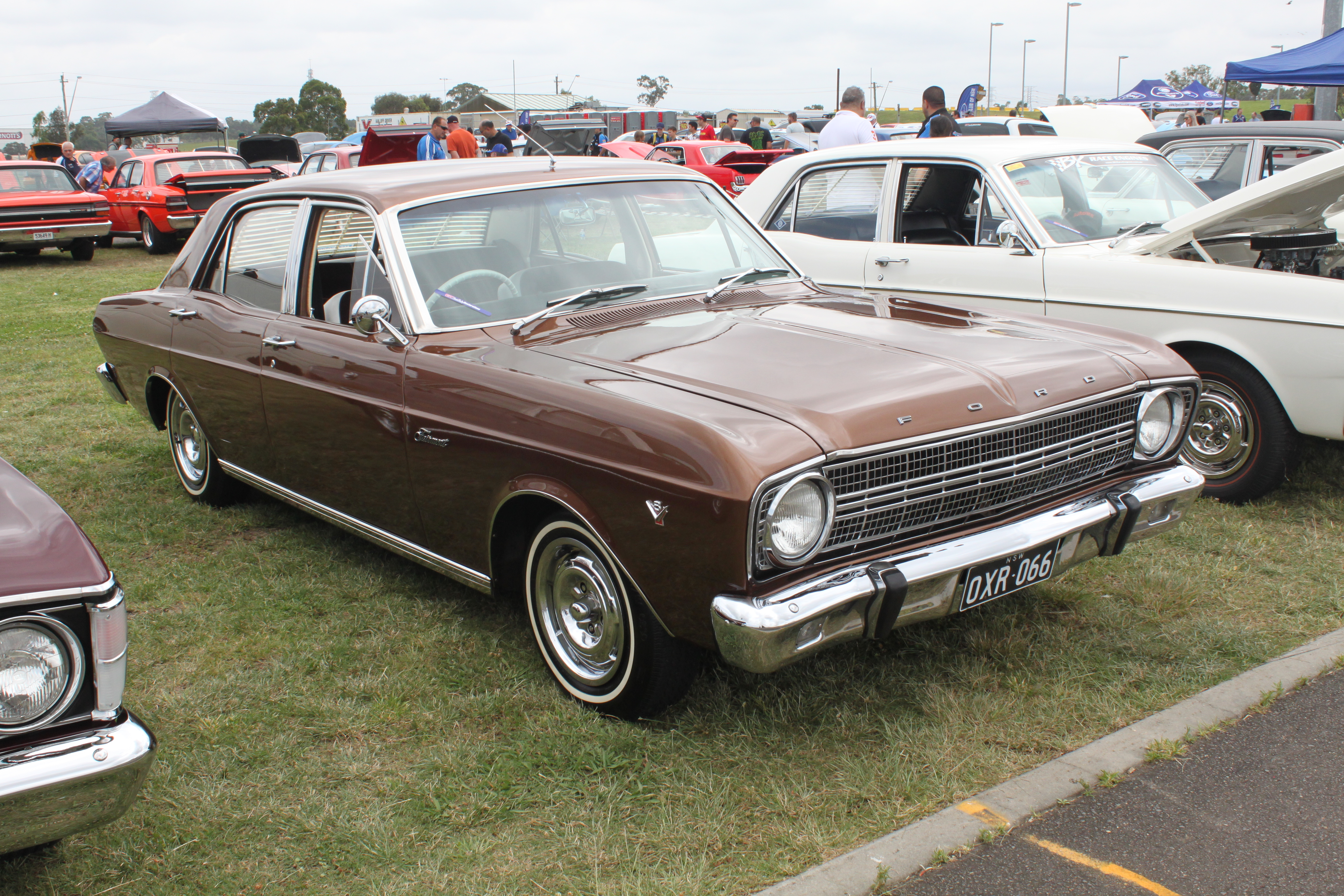
XR Fairmont sedan

The next new model Falcon, the XR series, was introduced in September 1966. Styling was based on the third-generation 1966 US Ford Falcon and it was promoted as the "Mustang bred Falcon". It was the first Australian Falcon to be offered with a V8 engine, the 200 bhp (150 kW), 289 cubic inch (4.7 litre) Windsor unit. The XR marked the first time a V8 engine could be optioned in all trim levels of an Australian car, V8s having previously been reserved for the more up-market variants. The 144 in^{3} (2.4 L) six-cylinder engine was deleted for the XR series, leaving the 170 in^{3} (2.8 L) six as the base Falcon engine. A 200 in^{3} (3.3 L) six was also available.

The XR series was initially offered in nine different models: Falcon, Falcon 500, and Fairmont sedans, Falcon, Falcon 500, and Fairmont wagons, Falcon and Falcon 500 utilities, and the Falcon Van. The new wagons shared the 111-inch (2,800 mm) wheelbase with the XR sedans, unlike the 1966 US Falcon wagons which featured a 115-inch (2,900 mm) wheelbase. The Falcon 500 replaced the Falcon Deluxe of the XP series and the two-door hardtop body style available in the XP series was not offered in the XR range. Ford New Zealand, which assembled the Falcon 500 at its Seaview, Lower Hutt, plant near Wellington, introduced a short-lived Falcon 600 model into the XR and subsequent XT ranges, with additional equipment such as a heater standard. The Fairmont and GT models were not locally assembled, but were imported from Australia in limited numbers.

The Falcon XR won the Wheels Car of the Year Award in 1966, giving Ford Falcon two consecutive wins.

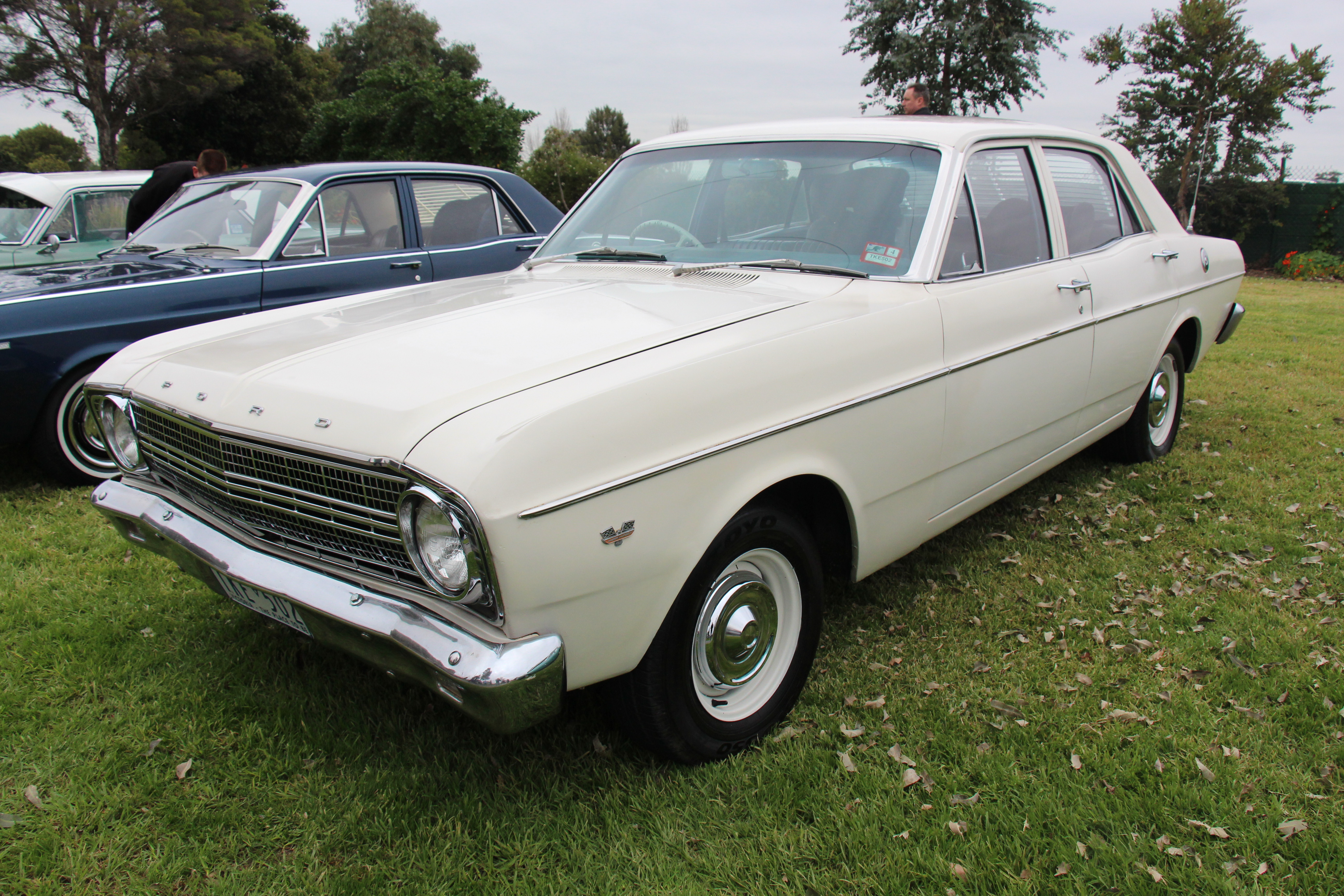
XR Falcon sedan

The marketing focus on the Falcon's relationship with the Mustang's design appeal led to Ford introducing a Falcon GT variant of the XR in 1967, featuring a 225 bhp (168 kW) version of the 289 in^{3} (4.7 L) Windsor V8 engine, sourced from the Ford Mustang. The GT marked the beginning of the Australian muscle car. All of the original XR GTs were painted in the colour "GT gold", except for eight that were "Gallaher Silver" and another five that were "Russet Bronze", "Sultan Maroon", "Polar White", "Avis White" and "Ivy Green". The non-gold GTs, while having the same specifications, are the rarest of the early Australian muscle cars.

Also specified on the first GT Falcon was a Hurst shifter for the four-speed gearbox, a deep-dish sports steering wheel, sports instrumentation, chrome full-cover wheel trims, and thick "GT stripes" along the lower panels between the front and rear wheels.

=== XT ===
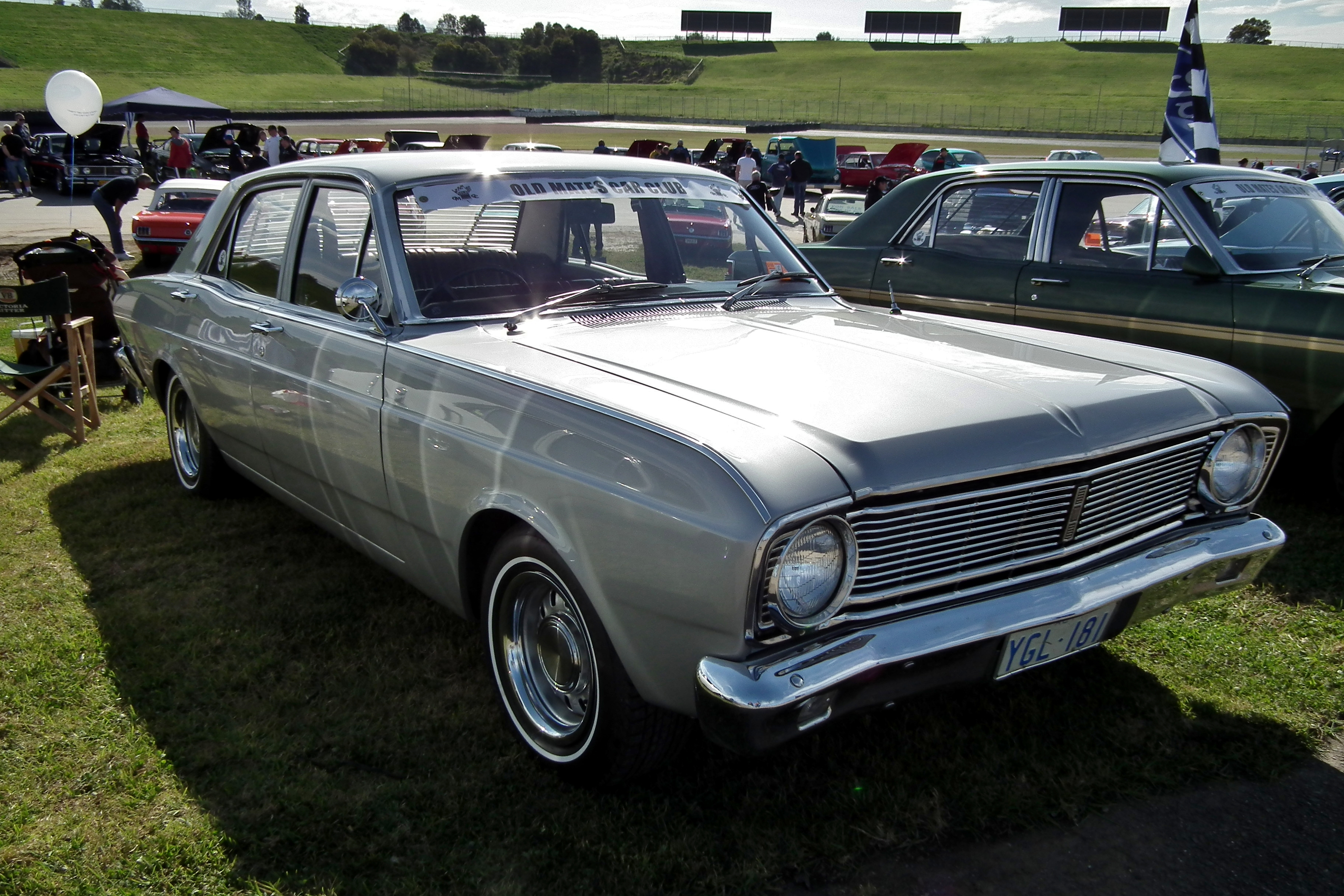
XT Falcon 500 sedan

The 1968 XT model featured a mild facelift, with a divided grille, and inset driving lights for the GT. The GT also replaced the thick lower body stripes of the XR with narrow stripes along the waistline from grille to tail light. The tail lights were still round, but instead of the small round indicator of the XR, the XT model had a long indicator across the light. Otherwise, all external body panels and bumpers were the same as the XR.

The XT buyer also could choose a 188 cu in (3.1 L) or a 221 cu in (3.6 L) six-cylinder engine.

The 289 in^{3} V8 engine was replaced by a new 302 cu in (4.9 L) unit.

The XT series Falcon is not to be confused with the entry-level XT model variant introduced in 2002 with the BA series Falcon.

=== XW ===
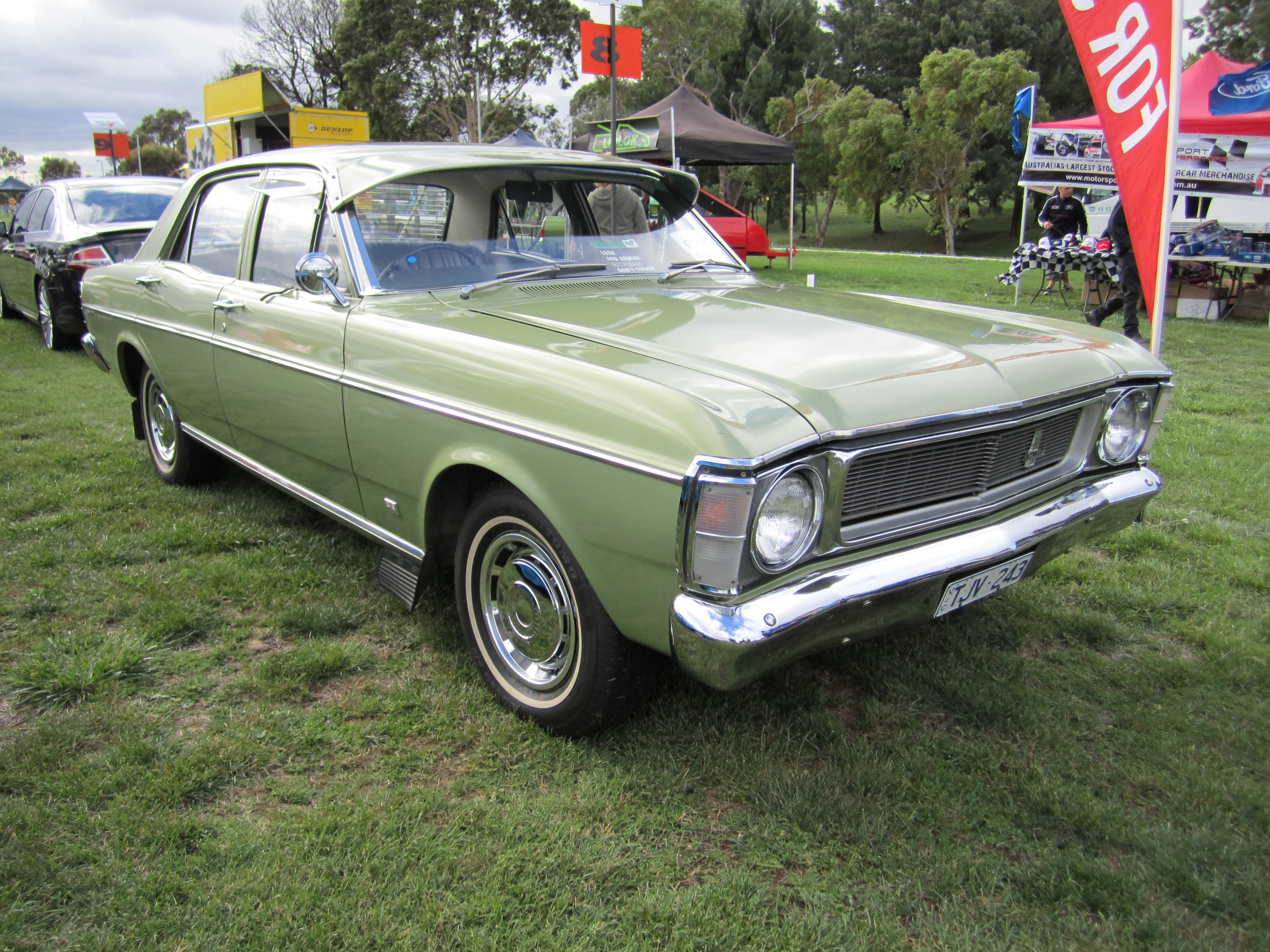
XW Falcon sedan

The 1969 XW Falcon introduced bolder styling which featured raised ridges down each front guard and a 'buttressed' c-pillar (although the rear windscreen was not relocated), which made the cars appear larger than the XR/XT models. A new dashboard and trim variations also appeared. Factory-fitted fully integrated air conditioning was made available as an option for the first time.

The GT variant gained a bigger V8, the 351 cu in (5.8 L) Canadian-made Windsor engine, producing 291 horsepower (217 kW) equipped with dual exhausts and sports air cleaner. The styling of the GT went wilder with the addition of an offset racing-style bonnet scoop, bonnet locks, and blackouts, as well as 'Super Roo' stripes along the full length of the car (these and the bonnet blackouts were a 'delete option'). GT wheels were now 12-slot steel with flat centre caps over the lug nuts and stainless steel dress rims. The twin 'driving lights' introduced on the XT GT were carried over to the XW GT.

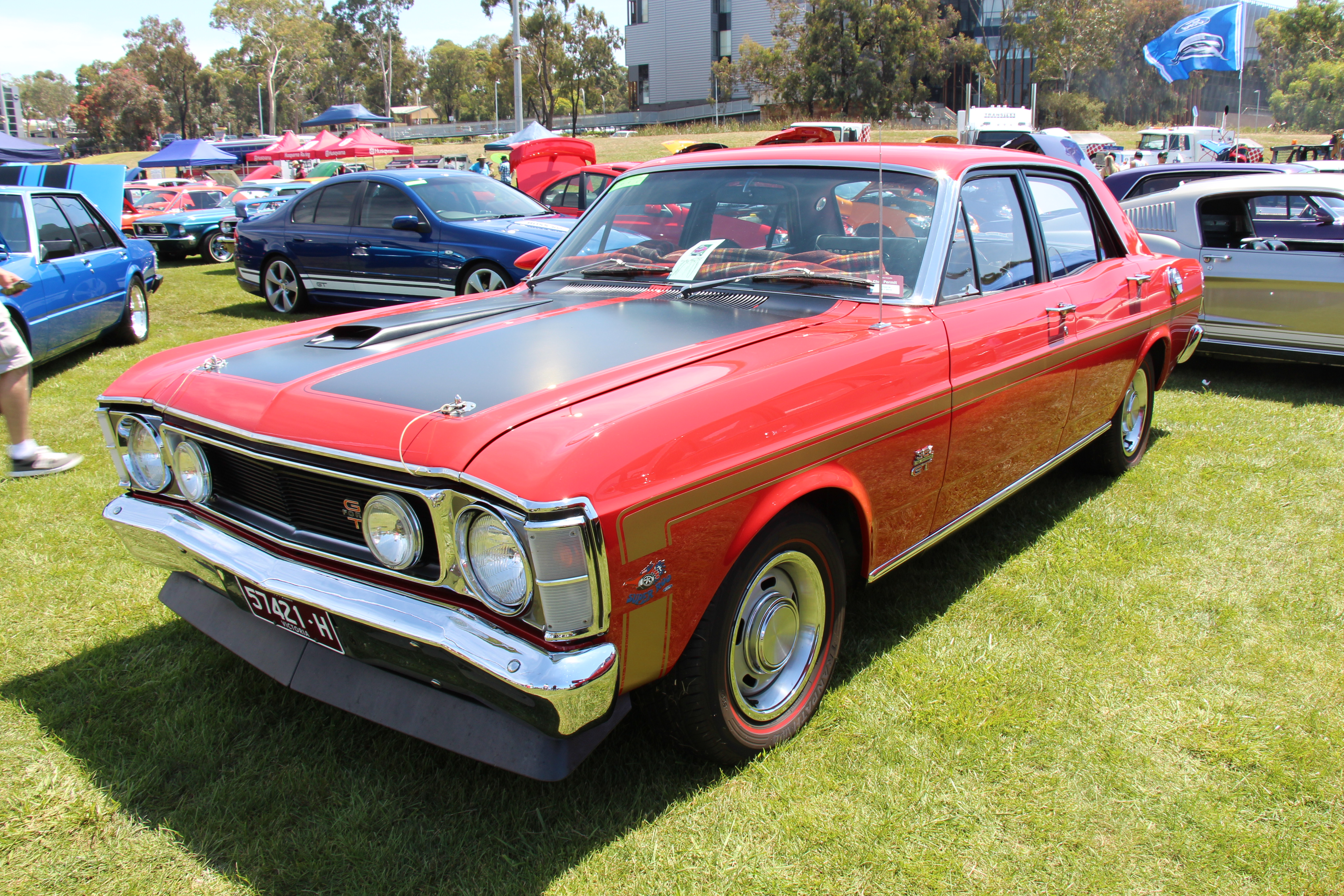
XW Falcon GTHO

In August 1969, the XW also introduced the GT-HO specification. The GT-HO was a homologation specially built for racing. Externally, it was almost indistinguishable from a standard GT, but offered a higher-performance engine and improved suspension— although the 'HO' stood for 'Handling Option', the cars also gained larger Holley carburettors and other performance additions. The Phase I or 'Windsor HO' was fitted with the 351 in^{3} Windsor V8, but was replaced a year later with the 351 Cleveland, producing 300 horsepower (220 kW) in the Phase II GT-HO. Phase II GT-HO wheels featured a new five-slot design.

The XW also gained a GS ('Grand Sport') option, which could be optioned with the 188 cu in (3.1 L), 221 cu in (3.6 L) six-cylinder, or 302 cu in (4.9 L) Windsor V8 engines, but not the 351 cu in (5.8 L) Windsor V8 on Falcon 500, Futura, and Fairmont. It offered the same dash as the GT with sports instruments, sport wheel trims, and stripes. The GS lasted until the 1978 XC series I model, longer than the GT, which finished with the XB.

=== XY ===
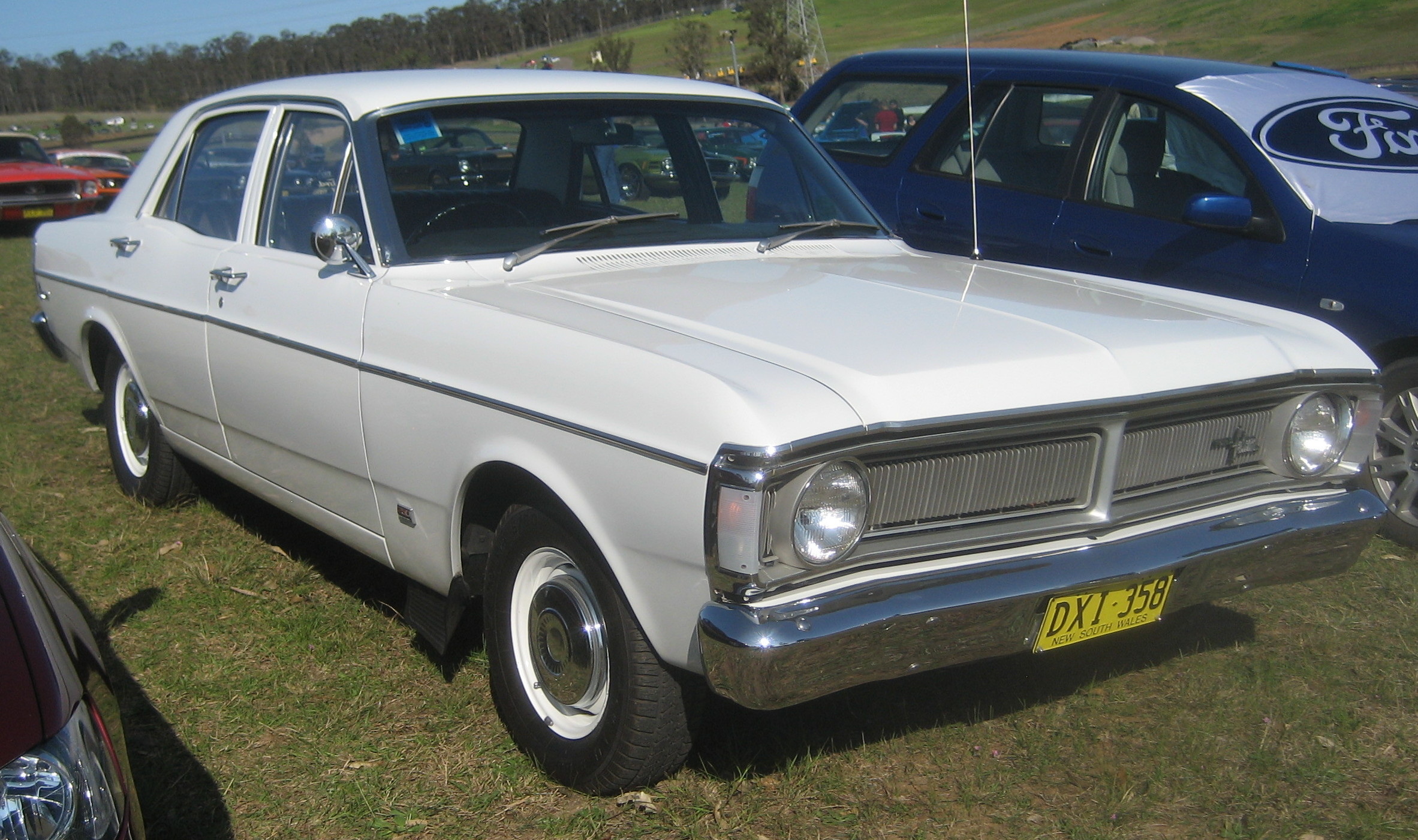
XY Falcon sedan

The venerated XY was released in October 1970, with variations to grille and tail lights but otherwise unchanged bodywork from the XW. The six-cylinder motors were bigger—200 cu in (3.3 L) and 250 cu in (4.1 L). A two-barrel (2V) carbureted) version of the 351 Cleveland V8 was an option on all sedans. All GT models remain valuable collectors' cars and this is especially true of the XY GT and XY GTHO Phase III, released in 1970.

The GT's styling went wilder again with a 'Shaker' cold-air induction scoop protruding from a hole in the bonnet, which now sported twin wide GT stripes from grille to windscreen, rather than the bonnet blackouts of the XW. The thick side stripes remained, although altered slightly, as did the twin driving lights and blacked-out panel between the tail lights. Wheels were now the five-slot steel items first seen on the XW Phase II GT-HO. The Phase III GT-HO also sported a plastic front spoiler and a wild bootlid spoiler styled after those fitted to the Mach series Mustangs.

The upgraded Cleveland V8 in the 1971 XY (dizzy in the front) GTHO Phase III produced an estimated 385 brake horsepower (287 kW), although Fords official figures for this motor were much lower. The 750 cfm Holley carburettor of the XW GT-HO Phase II was replaced by a 780 cfm Holley, along with numerous other performance modifications. The Phase III was Australia's fastest four-door production car and possibly the fastest four-door sedan in the world at the time, with a top speed of 141.5 mph (227.7 km/h). Power figures are still debated today, as Ford still claimed 300 hp (220 kW) as the standard 351 Cleveland V8 in the GT though the GTHO Phase III received many modifications to increase its reliability and race performance. In 1972, Ford made the 15 in Globe 'Bathurst' alloy wheels available as an upgrade to the GTHO Phase III.

During the life of the XY model, the uniquely Australian uprated 200, 250-1V and 250-2V variants of the seven-main-bearing six cylinder were introduced. Cleveland V8s were imported initially, until the Geelong Foundry began to produce these motors for automatic Falcons in mid-1972. The transmissions included both Ford and Borg-Warner, as did rear axles. The XY is now widely regarded as the best Falcon made in Australia, not just with its Bathurst dominance, but also in its performance, build quality, and refinement, which was superior to competitors at the time. Current values for XYs compared to other Aussie Falcons, and their competitors, attest to this.

Australia's first production four-wheel-drive car-based vehicle—a utility—was introduced by Ford as an XY model in November 1972. All were fitted with the 250 in^{3} six that was mounted on a 30° slant to provide front axle suspension clearance between the front differential and the sump.

== Third generation (1972–1979) ==
=== XA ===
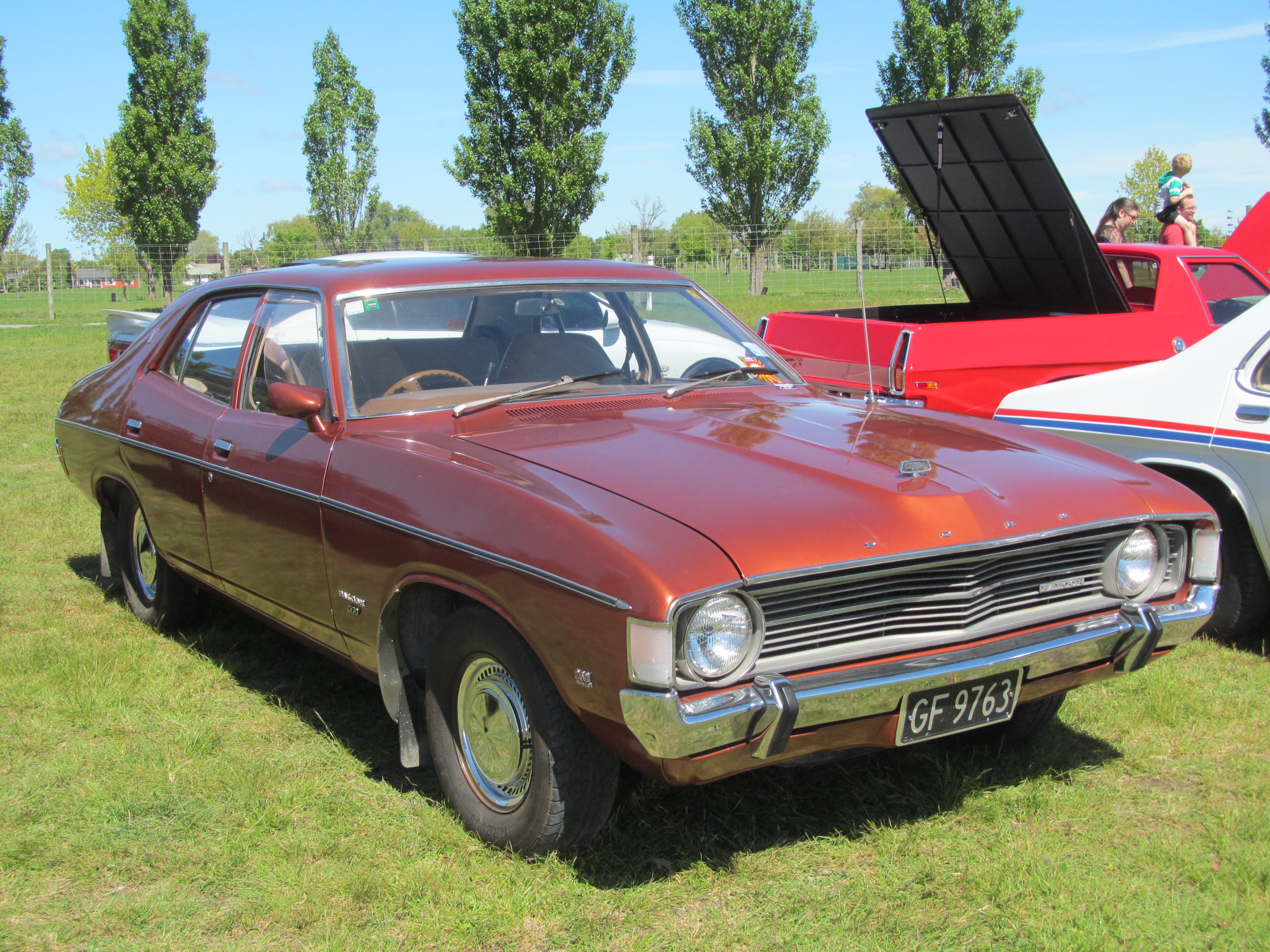
XA Falcon 500

The end of production of the Falcon in the US paved the way for much greater Australian input in the design of Australian-made Falcons, from 1972 onwards, although for several years a distinct resemblance to the US-made Mustang still existed, in part to the styling and design cues by Jack Telnack who designed the XA Falcon. The XA series introduced a new hardtop coupe model, with a distinctive range of paint colours; with purple and wild plum being popular, often ordered with white or black upholstery. The XA Falcon Hardtop bore a strong resemblance to the 1970–71 Ford Torino SportsRoof (both cars shared the same floor sheet metal), and shared its "frameless window" doors with the utility and panel van variants. The drivetrains carried over from the XY, although the 250-2V was soon dropped, and the 'full-house' GT-HO engines no longer required due to changes in production racing regulations. Ford had planned a 'Phase IV' GT-HO (and built four), but cancelled it in the wake of the so-called 'Supercar scare'.

The GT variant kept the twin driving lights, but reverted to a bonnet blackout with no stripes at all on the vehicle. The front guards received fake 'vents' just behind the indicators, and NACA ducts were added to the bonnet. Steel 12-slot wheels were reintroduced, although some GTs received the five-spoke Globe 'Bathurst' wheels, which had been ordered for the GT-HO Phase IV and now needed to be used. The GT's rear suspension featured radius rods to help locate the elliptical-spring solid rear axle. Other performance parts from the aborted Phase IV found their way onto GTs, including larger fuel tanks and winged sumps. These GTs are generally referred to as RPO83s after the option code covering the additional parts, although what parts any given RPO83 received seem to have been governed by the luck of the draw rather than any specific process.

From the rear, XA hardtops can be distinguished from later models by the tail lights, which have lenses which slope inwards (towards the front of the vehicle).

=== XB ===
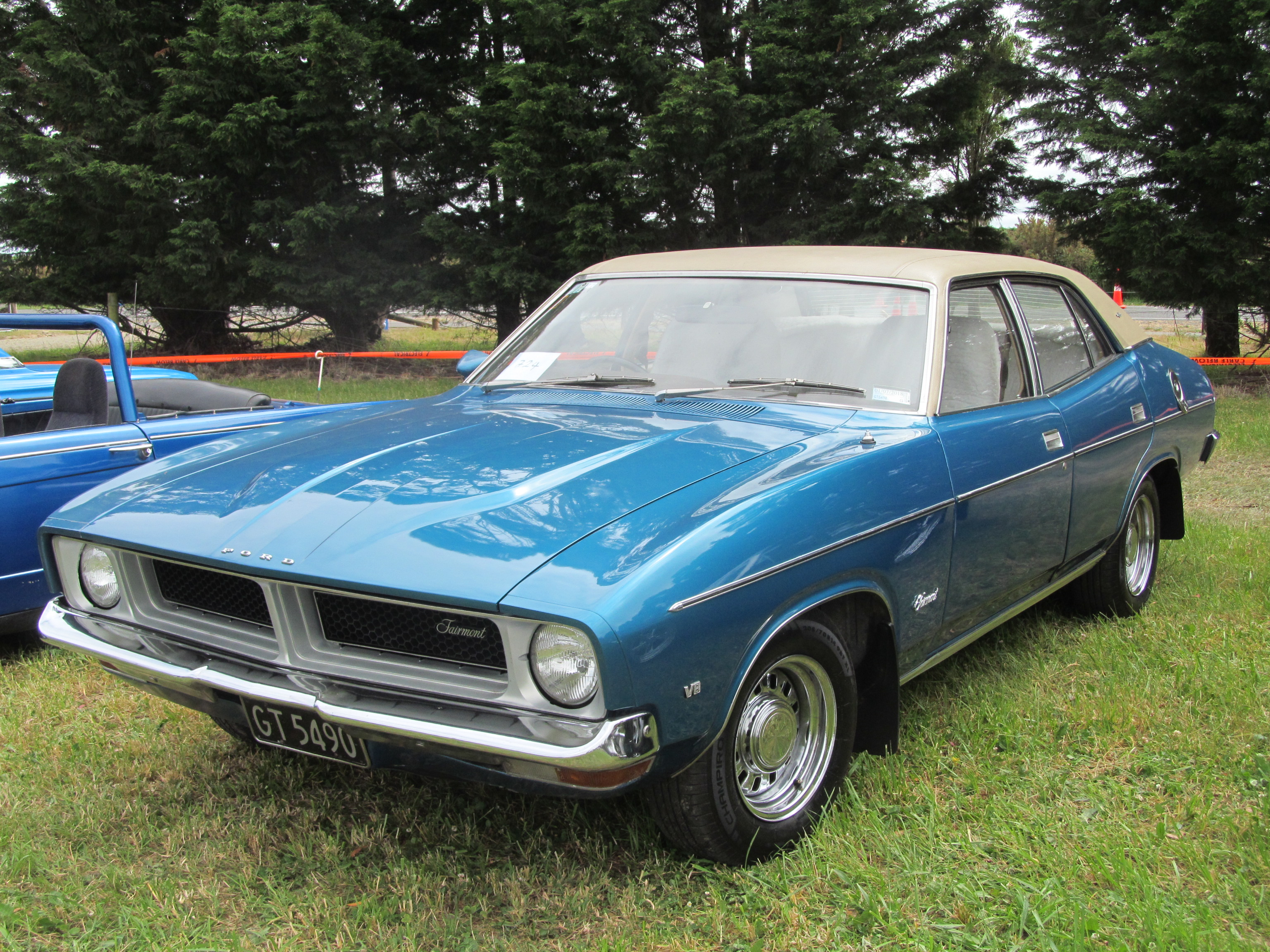
XB Fairmont

In 1973, the XB Falcon (sold with the slogan "The Great Australian Road Car") was introduced with more aggressive styling, a multifunction control stalk (indicators, high beam, horn), new colours including colour-coded bumpers on the GT variants, and minor trim variations. Engine options carried over from the XA-series. New panel van and utility option packages, "Surferoo" and "Surfsider" vans, and "Overnighter" ute, were introduced.

Power-assisted front disc brakes were now standard across the Falcon range. The GT variant of the XB also included four-wheel disc brakes (the earlier GT/GT-HO models used large finned drums at the rear). The first 211 XB GTs built were fitted with a US-built version of the Cleveland 351 cu in (5.8 L) V8 engine known as the 'big port', and later XB GTs were fitted with an Australian-built version of the engine with 'small port' heads and a 4-barrel 605 CFM downdraught Autolite 4300 carburetor, rated at 224 kW (300 bhp; 305 PS) @ 5400 rpm and 515 N⋅m (380 lb⋅ft) @ 3400 rpm of torque. The twin driving lights remained, as did the bonnet locks. The bonnet scoops of the GT were now integrated into the "power bulge" on the bonnet, the bumpers were now body-coloured, and the power bulge, wheel arches, sills, and valances were painted in a contrasting colour to the body colour (usually black, but dependent upon the actual body colour choice).

This classic car is world-renowned for its starring roles in the movies Mad Max and Mad Max 2 (The Road Warrior), both starring Mel Gibson. In Mad Max, the police use yellow XA and XB sedans, and Max later drives a customised black XB hardtop known as the Pursuit Special, or black-on-black due to its matte black over gloss black paint scheme. In Mad Max 2 (The Road Warrior) it was referred to as the "Last of the V8 Interceptors". It is often referred to as Max's Interceptor, but all the MFP cars badged "Interceptor" were four-door sedans, including the one Max drove during the Night Rider chase.

The Ford Landau, a two-door "personal coupé" based on the XB Falcon Hardtop was released in August 1973.

=== XC ===
In July 1976, Ford introduced the XC Falcon, which was the first model to comply with the new pollution regulations specified under Australian Design Rule 27A. This led to locally produced Cleveland V8s and the introduction of the cross-flow (also called the X-flow) six-cylinder. Versions of this engine were produced in North America and, in various guises, used in Australian Falcons through to the XF. Its long stroke and large capacity made for very good 'towing' torque, while its thick castings and relatively loose tolerances gave it a reputation for reliability in spite of abuse.

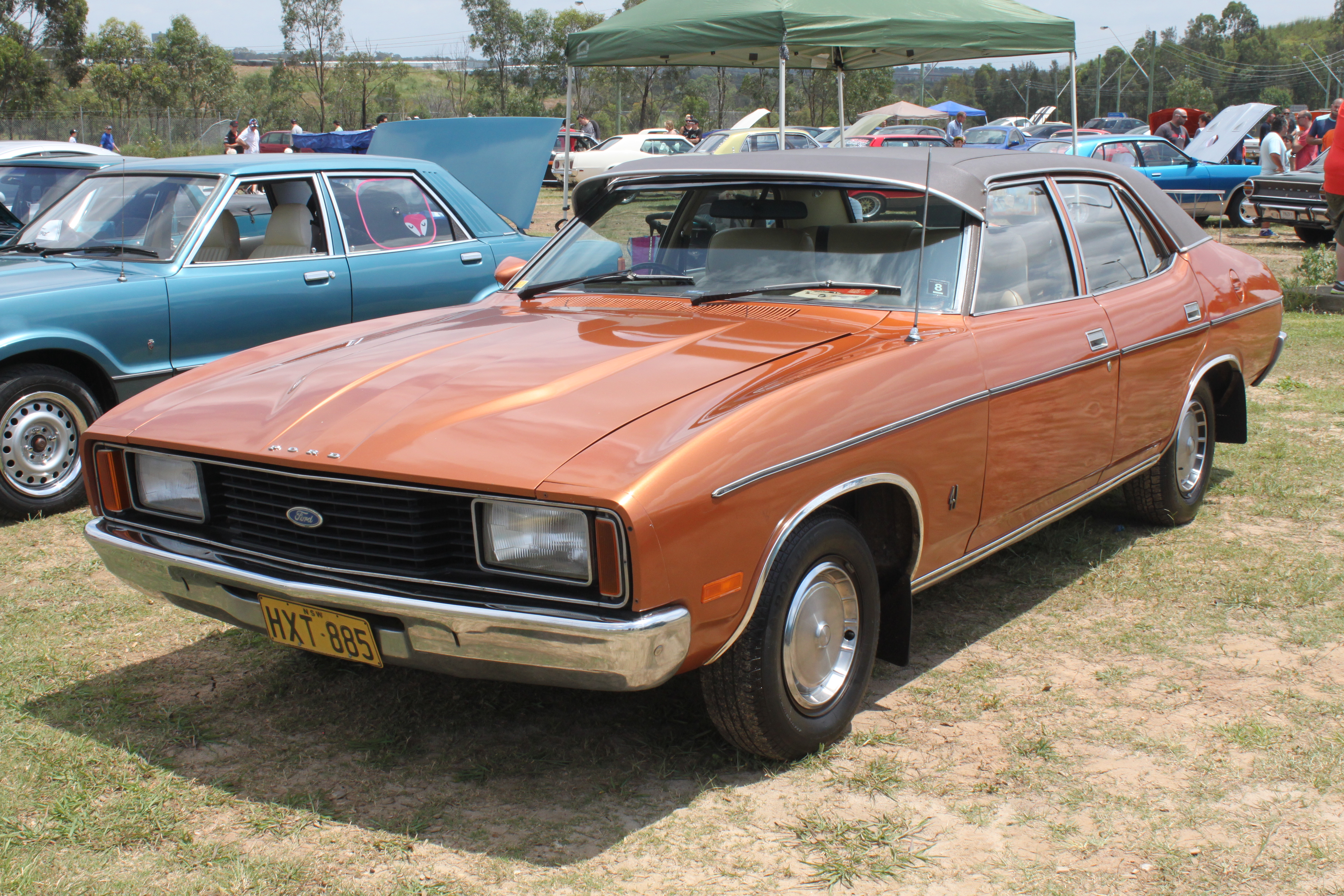
XC Fairmont sedan

The XC also introduced the country's first locally produced family sedans with a suspension designed around radial-ply tyres. Known as "Touring Suspension" (or 'Sports Handling Suspension'), it initially was standard on the Fairmont GXL sedan (optional on other sedans) until it was made standard equipment on all sedans and hardtops in the 1978 'XC½' facelift. For better handling on station wagons, owners could order the stiffer heavy duty suspension package as a no-cost option.

Other changes included a totally different dashboard layout to the XA/XB series, new rear doors with a lower sill cut, air extraction vents in the rear of the C-pillars, and very large bumpers front and rear with no additional valance panel under them.

From behind, XC hardtops can be distinguished from earlier models by the tail lights, which have flat lenses with black bezels.

The Falcon Sundowner Van, based on the Falcon 500 Van, was introduced in 1977. It included options from the Falcon GS Hardtop, such as comprehensive instrumentation, bonnet scoops, slotted sports road wheels, and driving lights, but with bodyside protection mouldings and van side glass deleted. Side and rear decals were included in the package, as was the "sedan ride" 500 kg (10-cwt) suspension package and ER70 H14 radial-ply tyres.

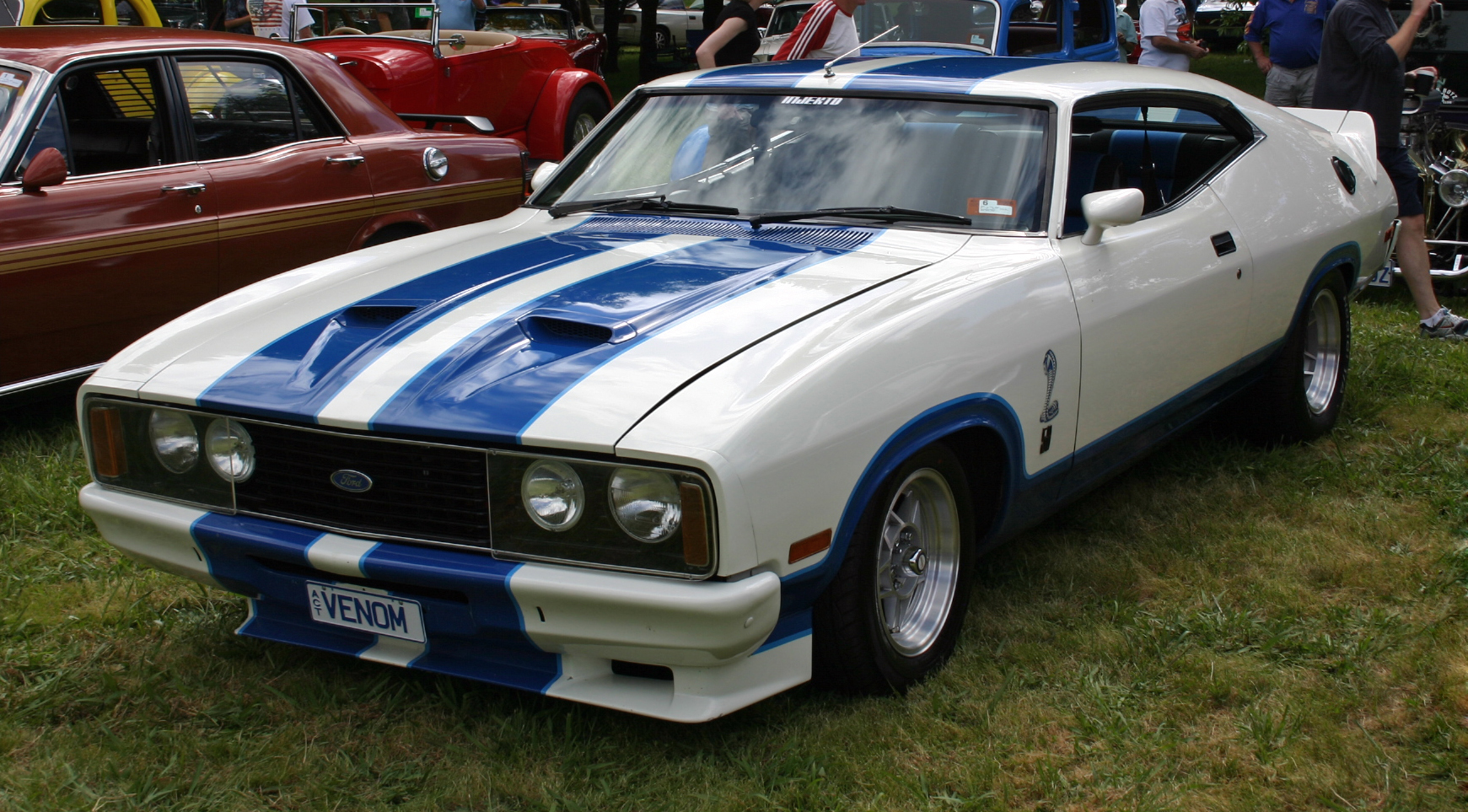
XC Falcon Cobra coupé

In 1978, inspired by a dominating 1–2 finish for Falcon hardtops at the 1977 Hardie Ferodo 1000, Ford introduced the limited-edition Cobra, which used the last 400 hardtop coupé bodyshells. Based on the Falcon GS Hardtop model, each Cobra was individually numbered and featured highlights such as Globe 15-in alloy road wheels copied from Ferrari intended to aid brake disc cooling, ER70 H15 radial-ply tyres, comprehensive instrumentation, bonnet scoops, driving lights, dual exhaust, four-wheel disc brakes, and a distinctive white and blue colour scheme. The 5.8 L engines were installed in cars numbered 002 to 199 and No 351, and the 4.9 L engines were installed in the rest (001, plus 200 to 400 except for no. 351).

The Falcon, while popular, was usually outsold in Australia by GM Holden's Kingswood until 1978, when it started to gain ground after Holden decided to replace the Kingswood with a smaller model called the Commodore, based on the European Opel models.

Holden gambled that the predicted increase of oil prices during this era would drive consumers to choose smaller, more fuel-efficient cars, but the oil price rise never materialised, whilst Ford dealers aggressively pitched the Cortina 6 against the Commodore alternative until the XD Falcon arrived in 1979.

== Fourth generation (1979–1999) ==
=== XD ===
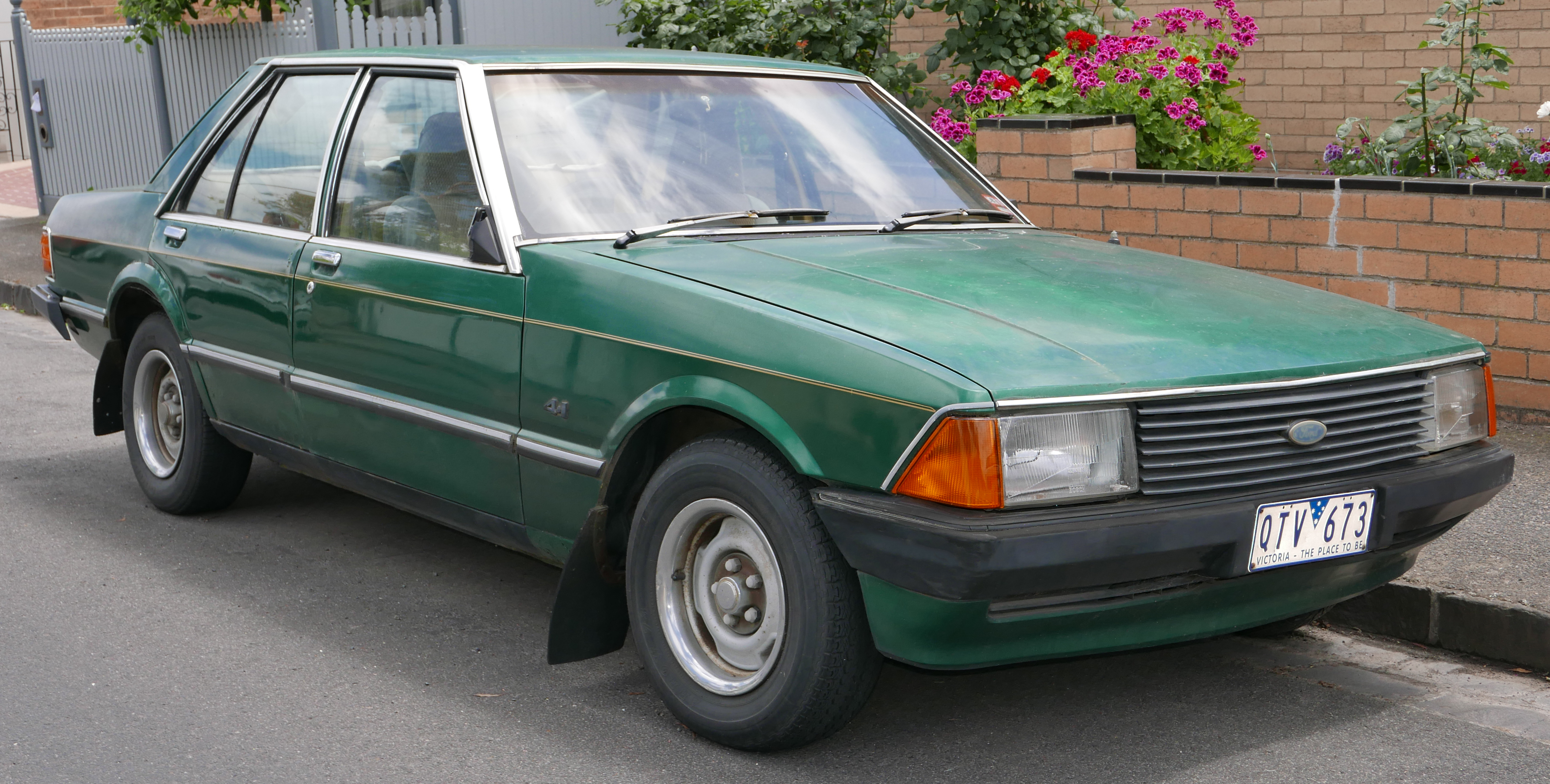
XD Fairmont sedan

Ford's next model Falcon, the XD (Project Blackwood), introduced in 1979, bore many external styling resemblances to the European Ford Granada, but was slightly larger and less luxurious. Improved body reinforcing allowed many reductions in component weight to be made, improving performance and braking. The Fairmont Ghia replaced the Fairmont GXL.

Initially, as with the first Commodores, quality and fuel consumption concerns dogged the XD. The 1980 introduction of the alloy head improved the fuel economy of the ageing OHV six-cylinder engine, an engine with its roots in the 1950s, while at the same time boosting power in the high-compression 4.1 L version from 92 to 94 kilowatts (123 to 126 hp). However, during this period, a combination of government pressure, the fuel crisis, and more stringent pollution controls began to curtail the development of high-performance cars.

Along with Ford's consideration to delete the V8 engine, Ford had also planned to replace the Falcon after the XE model with a smaller front-wheel drive sedan and hatchback derived from the Ford Telstar/Mazda 626 platform in a program codenamed "Capricorn". By 1981, however, thanks to the Falcon's sales success, Capricorn was cancelled by incoming CEO Bill Dix in favour of the EA26 program, a new full-size, rear-wheel drive car range that would become the fifth-generation Falcon.

=== XE ===
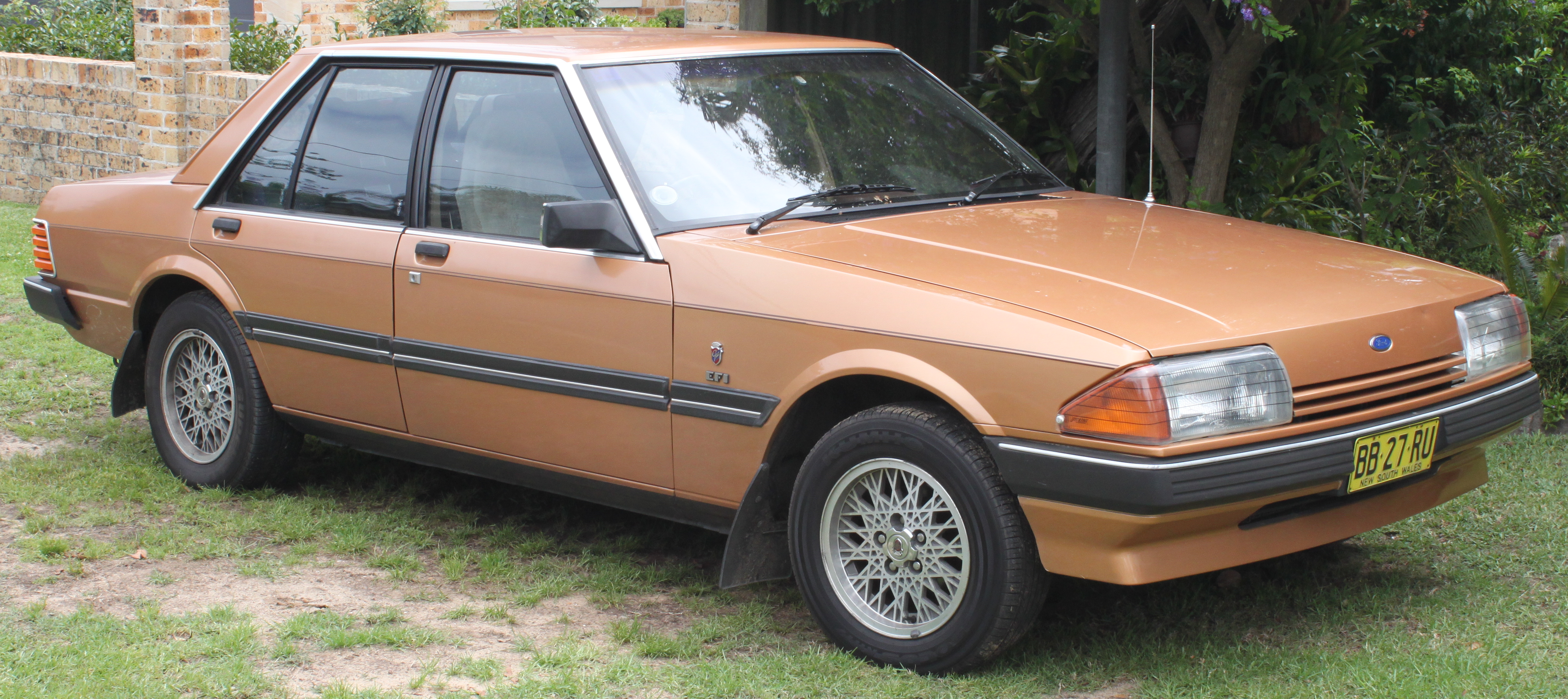
XE Fairmont Ghia sedan

As the fuel crisis eased, Australians moved away from the downsized Commodore back to the traditional full-size Falcon. In 1982, for the first time in more than a decade, the XE Falcon, with its Watt's linkage coil-sprung rear suspension and fuel-saving differential ratios (4.1 L models) eclipsed its Holden rival in terms of sales. Ford Falcon remained number-one seller in Australia until 1988, when Holden returned to the full-size Australian sedan design. A manual transmission was available in three-speed column shift (in six-seater vehicles) or four-speed floor shift, with a five-speed floor shift also available with the base 3.3 L engine. An automatic transmission was available as a three-speed, column or floor shift.

Ford's Australian-manufactured 'Cleveland' V8s were discontinued in 1982. During this period, Ford Australia also built a quantity of four-bolt 351C engines—similar to those used in NASCAR at the time—for race purposes in Australia. With the 351's local race career ending in 1985, the remains were shipped and sold in the United States.

The last V8-powered Australian Ford Falcon passenger car (until this powerplant's return in 1991) was a silver 4.9-l (302 in^{3}) Ford XE Fairmont Ghia ESP sedan, VIN # JG32AR33633K, in November 1982. Ford Australia continued to make remnant stock of the 5.8 litre (351C) engine available in Bronco and F-series vehicles until August 1985.

In 1983, the 4.1 L EFI six-cylinder engine was introduced to replace the 4.9 L V8, but initially produced 111 kilowatts (149 hp) and 325 newton-metres (240 lb⋅ft) of torque, well down from the 149 kilowatts (200 hp) and 415 newton-metres (306 lb⋅ft) previously produced by the 5.8 L V8.

=== XF ===
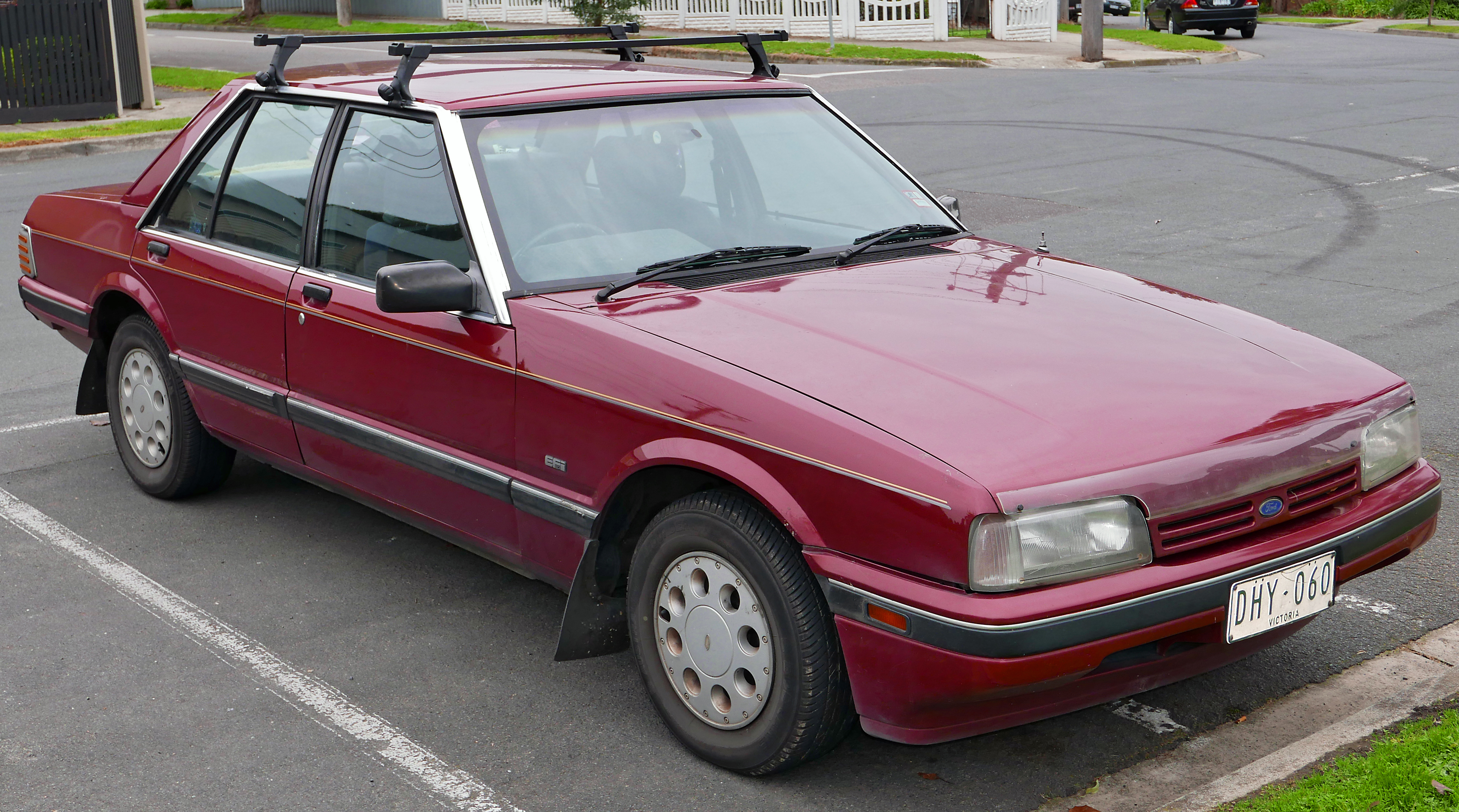
XF Fairmont sedan

The Falcon XF sedan and wagon sold between October 1984 and March 1988, with the ute and van running through to March 1993.

In the aftermath of the cancellation of the Capricorn program in 1981, the XF Falcon was conceived as an interim facelift for the XE Falcon until the all-new fifth-generation Falcon was ready to go on sale. New front-end styling gave a softer, more rounded appearance, and the interiors featured updated seating, moulded door trims and new colour-keyed dashboards. The Fairmont Ghia received the high-end Fairlane/LTD dashboard which featured comprehensive digital instrumentation, binnacle-mounted pushbutton controls for functions such as air conditioning and cruise control, and the further option of a trip computer.

The XF was the first model since the XP not to offer a V8 engine. There were three six-cylinder engine options, being carburetted 3.3 and 4.1 L engines, and the fuel-injected 4.1 L engine which now used Ford's EEC IV engine management system. All engines were modified to run on unleaded petrol from January 1986. Only the carburetted 4.1 litre engine was offered following the discontinuation of the XF Falcon sedan and wagon range in 1988.

The XF Falcon continued the sales leadership of its predecessor. It remains Ford Australia's best-selling Falcon model ever with 278,101 built.

This total was boosted by the prolonged production run of the utility and panel van models. Ford had not developed an EA26 Falcon-based replacement for the XF commercial vehicle range, intending to discontinue these models due to declining sales as a result of their pricing being around 30 percent higher than imported Japanese commercial vehicles. However, the strengthening of the yen against the Australian dollar in the mid-1980s eliminated the price advantage of the Japanese imports. This led to a sales revival for the Falcon commercial range such that by January 1987, Ford announced its intention to continue manufacturing the range.

=== XG ===
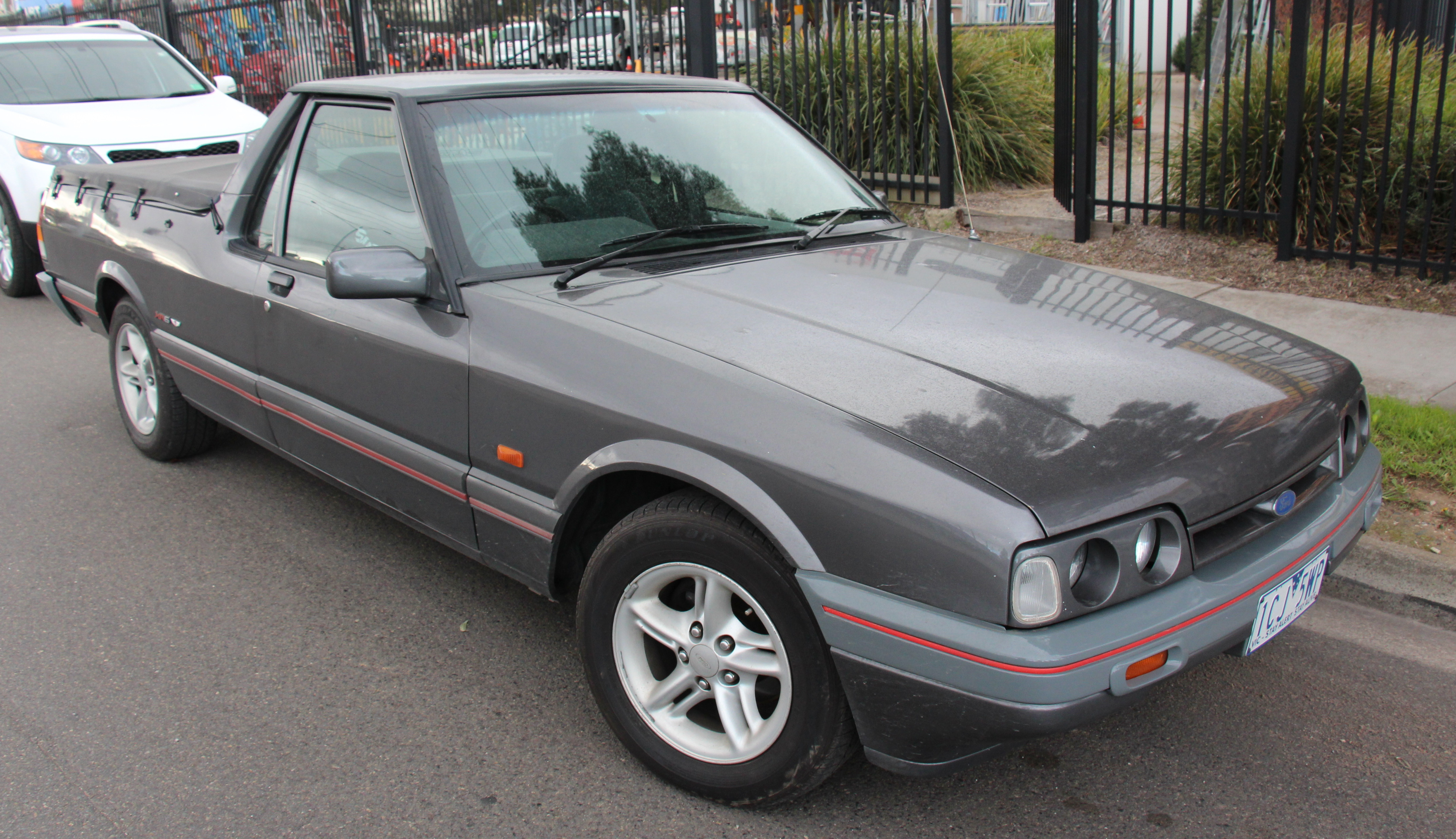
XG Falcon XR6 utility

When the XF Falcon passenger car range was replaced by the redesigned EA series, the XF commercials (utility and panel van) continued unchanged due to there being no EA series versions. The XF commercial models continued unchanged stylistically, but over time would gain the EB series engine updates.

The XG, released in March 1993, represented the most significant update to the Falcon commercials in over eight years. Aside from a new name—the ute was referred to as the 'Falcon Longreach'—the XG got a new engine, an exterior facelift, and lost the three-speed (or three-on-the-tree) column-shift manual transmission (and the three-speed column-auto ) but now with a five-speed manual on the floor. Ford Australia added the Longreach name for its tough "workhorse" image, as the birthplace of Qantas and the home of the famous Australian Stockman's Hall of Fame on the boundaries of the outback. The model was introduced to the media in Longreach.

The XG was essentially an update of the XF. It gained the EB II's 4.0-l OHC inline six-cylinder engine, with either a five-speed manual or four-speed auto transmissions (floor or column shift), meaning Ford could retire the old engine and transmission options. It also gained interior updates from the EB including the instrument cluster, centre console (in two-seater models), steering wheel, and seats. Exterior changes were minimal, and included an EB-style grille, black window trims (as opposed to chrome on XF's) EB style door 'rubbing' strips, and indicator lights on the front quarter panels.

An XR6 model was released in October 1993. Over the standard model, it gained the ED's XR6 161 kilowatts (216 hp) engine, distinctive quad headlights, indicators in the front bumper (due to the different headlights), sportier suspension, ED XR6 seats, trim, 15 in five-spoke alloy wheels, and exterior badging. 1,050 XR6s were sold between October 1993 and March 1996.

=== XH ===
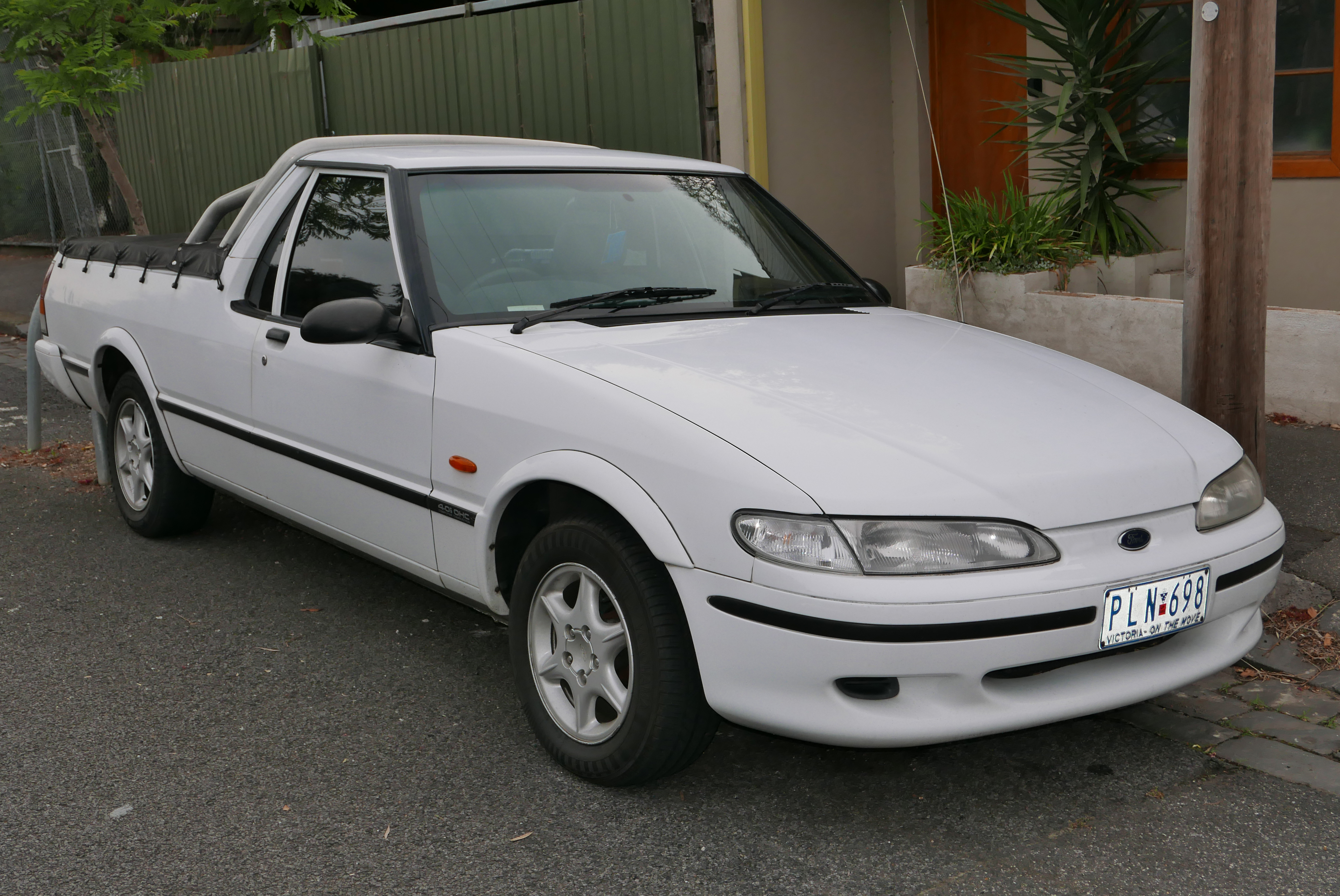
XH II Falcon Longreach GLi utility

The XH series Falcon utility and van, released in 1996, were essentially XG models facelifted to resemble the contemporary Falcon EF sedans and wagons. The XH also gained an all-new front suspension and rack and pinion steering from the EA–EL series cars. This meant changes to the frame and bodywork, from the firewall forward. The turret (roof) panel on the utility was now domed and lost its squared-off appearance, increasing interior head room. By this time, the popularity of the panel van had faded and Ford released their final Falcon panel van in 1997 as part of the revised XH II series. It was also with this model that the V8 engine was reintroduced into the Falcon utility commercial vehicle range. After 20 years, the fourth generation Falcon was discontinued in June 1999.

== Fifth generation (1988–1998) ==
=== EA ===
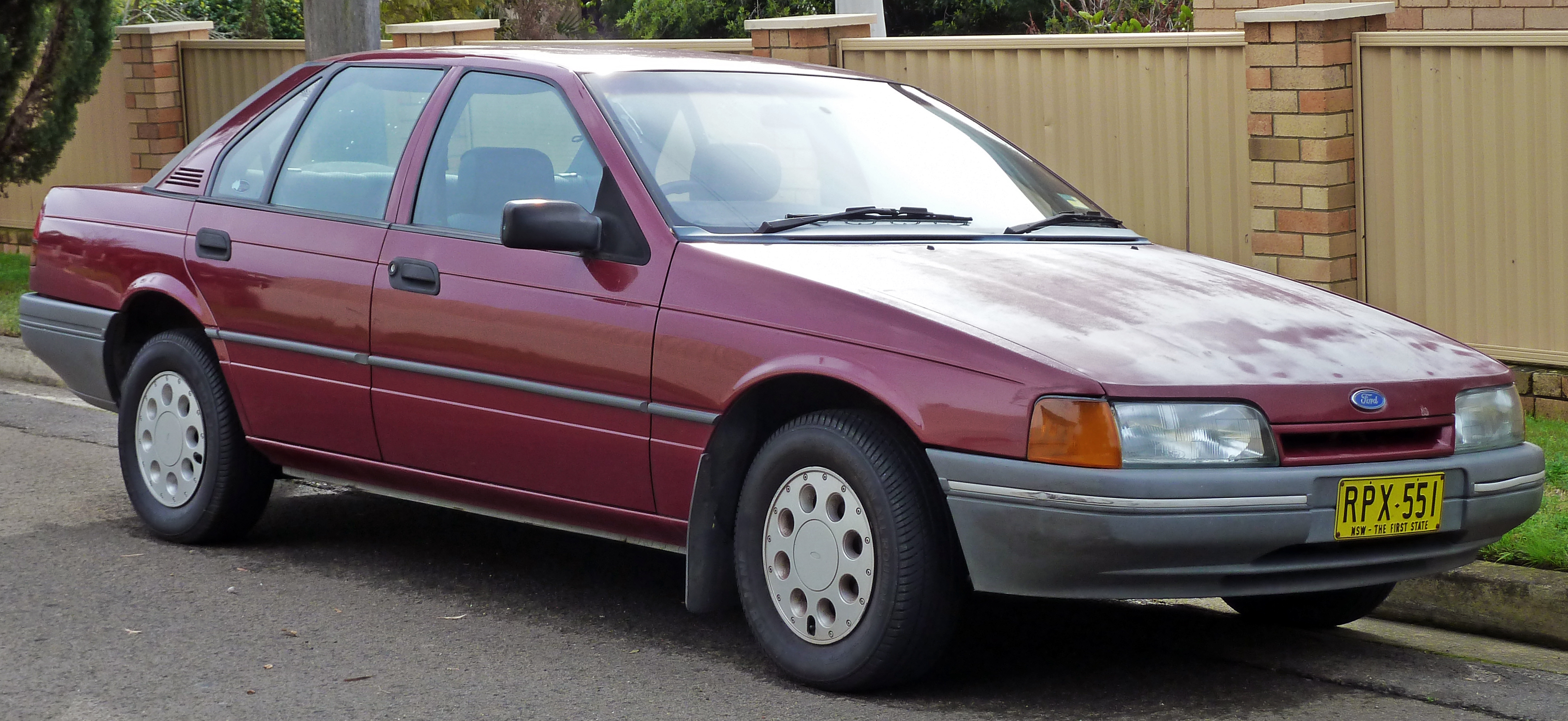
EA II Falcon GL sedan

As a result of an A$700 million development the Ford EA Falcon introduced in 1988, bore a passing resemblance to the European Ford Scorpio. Under the skin, however, it remained an entirely Australian design, and is credited as the first Falcon model to employ wind tunnel testing. The EA was also only produced in sedan and station wagon body styles, with the previous-model (XF) utility and panel van continuing in production.

The EA Falcon was available in four trim levels with a choice of three straight-six engine: the base GL powered by a 3.2 litre CFI (although the majority featured a 3.9 L version of the same engine); the luxury Fairmont powered by a 3.9 litre CFI; the sports Falcon S pack and upper luxury Fairmont Ghia both powered by a 3.9 L multi-point (MPI). A five-speed T50D fully synchronised manual and Borg-Warner M51 three-speed automatic transmission were offered, however, the latter was replaced by a four-speed BTR 85SXLE in the Series II upgrade and further upgraded to BTR 95LE with the EB series of 1991.

The EA Falcon, released under the codename EA26 (E for the large size, A for Australia, 26 for the (usually in sequence) global project number), would retain the traditional Falcon hallmarks of width and rear-wheel drive. This proved to be the correct move as sales of the Falcon began to climb after the fuel crisis aftermath, while those of the rival Commodore slipped. It became clear that Australian buying patterns had not truly changed and what the public wanted was a full-size (albeit smaller) family car.

In addition, Ford's dominance of the taxi market in Australia meant that a car that could comfortably seat three along the back seat—and even the front, with a bench seat installed—was necessary. It also ensured that Ford could retain, at least until Holden released the new Statesman/Caprice in 1990, the market for official cars for governmental use.

While initially popular, the EA's build quality was uncompetitive with uneven panel shutlines, computer problems, poor paint quality and front suspension alignment problems.

Launched in October 1989, the Series II brought with it a four-speed automatic transmission, body-coloured B-pillars, and the 3.2 L engine was dropped. Despite the Series II models having significantly fewer problems than the Series I, Series II prices are also affected by curtailed resale values. The same problem also affects the NA Fairlane and DA series LTD, and even the ute and panel van variants, which persisted with the older XF architecture.

=== EB ===
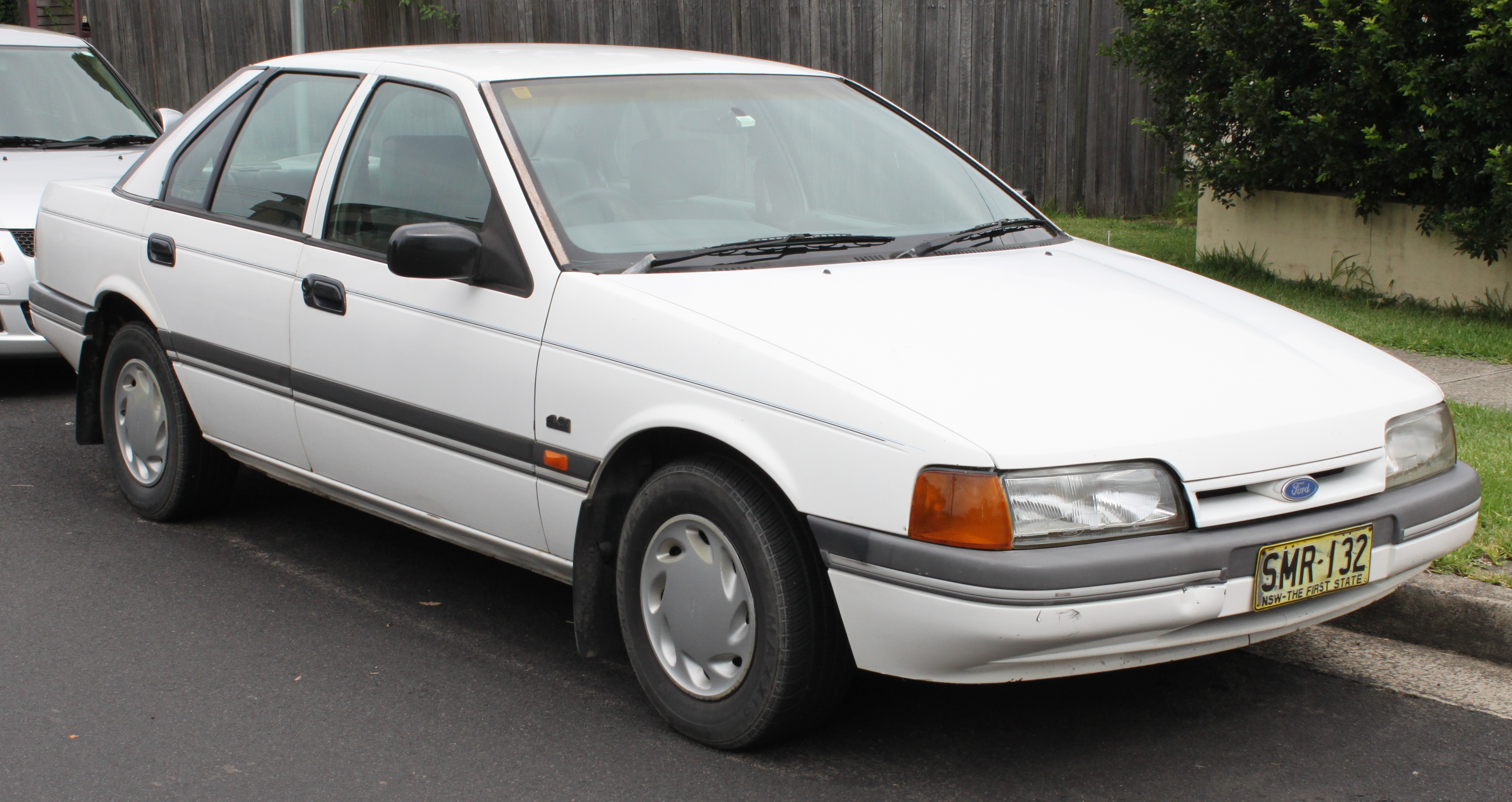
EB II Falcon GLi sedan

Visually, the 1991 EB Falcon remained nearly identical to its predecessor with subtle front and rear styling changes to the location of the Ford badge and the rear taillight applique, respectively. This series saw the reintroduction, by Ford Australia, of a V8 engine option (on sedans only) for the first time since 1982. Moreover, this series also saw the reintroduction of a Falcon GT model, with the refined "25th Anniversary" model limited to 265 units. Both this limited edition, and the first XR6 and XR8 sports models (that have continued with all subsequent Falcons and were originally marketed as S-XR6 and S-XR8) first appeared with the EB Series, through the then newly established Tickford Vehicle Engineering (TVE) joint-venture.

Reportedly costing A$1 million, the radically different Series II model of April 1992 primarily benefitted from a higher capacity 6-cylinder engine (up 35 cubic centimetres or from 3949 cc to 3984 cc), bringing its nominal total swept capacity to 4.0 L. The transmission and electronics were also improved and, externally, styling changes abounded including the base model now having body-coloured bumpers and its matte black plastic exterior door handles in a glossy finish. Other aspects of this upgrade consisted of improvements in safety, electronics and overall refinement. For example: the car now featured an advanced "Smartlock" security locking system standard across all models; anti-lock brakes became optional; a lap sash centre rear seatbelt became standard (from 1993); foam-filled A-pillars helped deliver better crash protection and Noise, Vibration, and Harshness (NVH) reductions.

=== ED ===
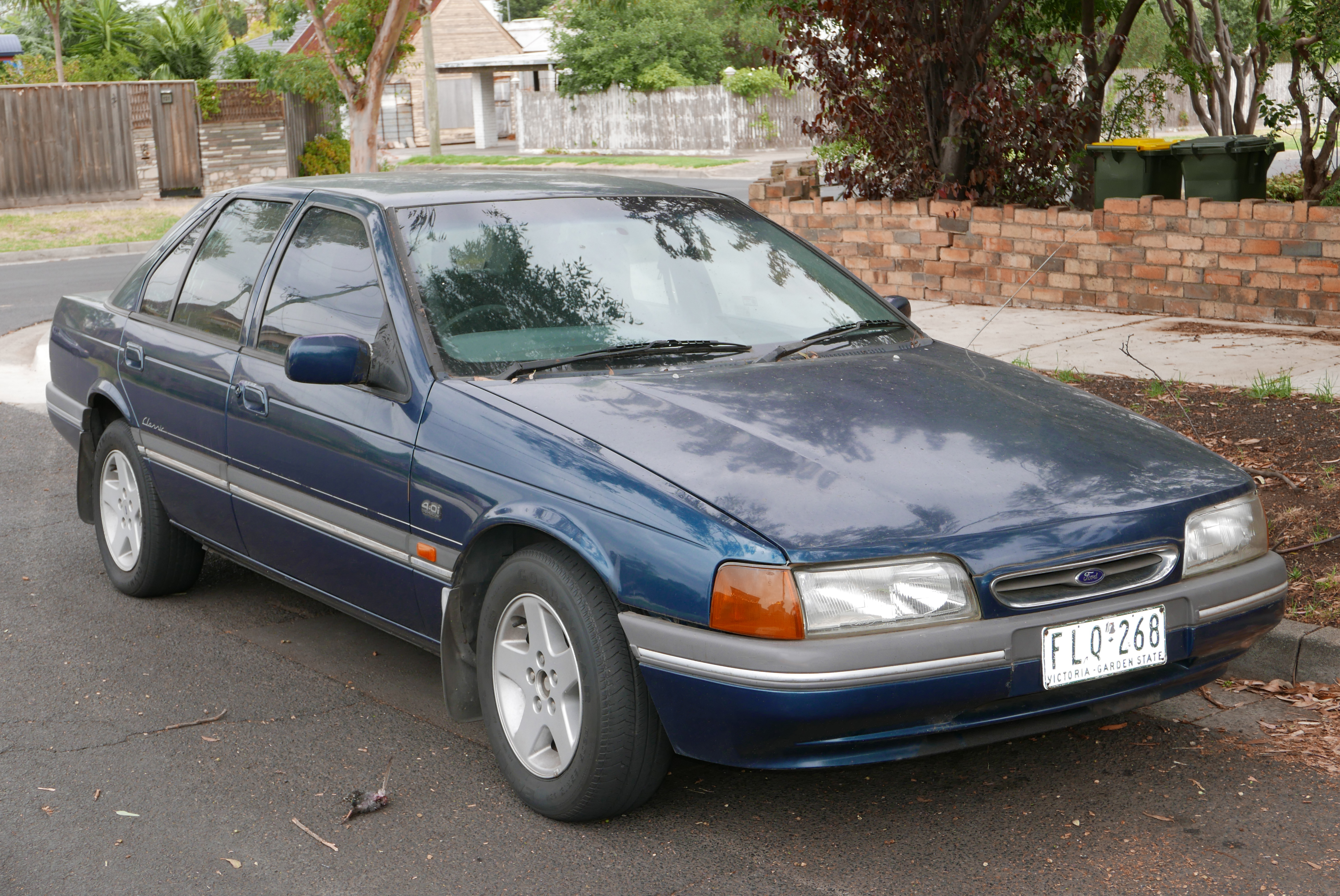
Falcon Futura Classic sedan (ED)

The front grille was now elliptical to differentiate it from the EB, and the sports genre (XR6, and XR8) gained an exclusive quad headlamp cluster. Making a comeback in the ED range was the Futura. The safety orientated Futura was marketed towards private buyers, and was equipped with cruise control, anti-lock brakes, and featured body-coloured mirrors. For the first time since the XF series, the luxurious Fairmont Ghia trim level was not available in station wagon form. The standard 4.0 L six-cylinder produced 148 kW (201 PS; 198 hp), the XR6 high-performance option 161 kW (219 PS; 216 hp), and the 5.0 litre EFI V8 165 kW (224 PS; 221 hp) at 4500 rpm.

=== EF ===
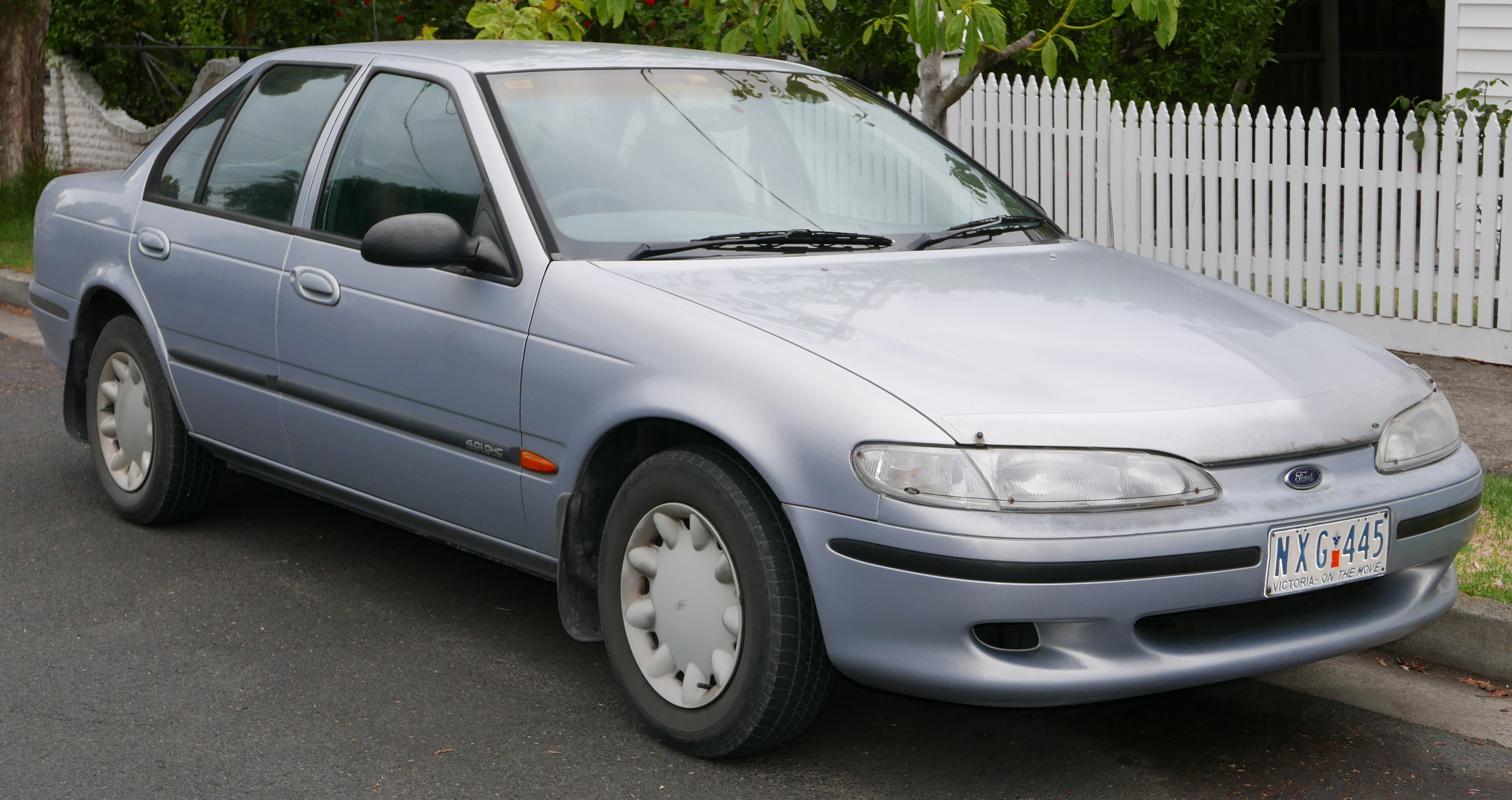
EF Fairmont sedan

When the facelifted EF was introduced in August 1994, it brought with it a new curvaceous body shape while sharing its doors (albeit, with a new door handle design) and most of its body structure with the earlier EA–ED series cars. Unlike the sedan, the station wagon inherited the rear styling of the ED series. With the new model, came a thoroughly redesigned interior. Cup holders were now prominent features in all models, and Ford paid particular attention to safety. A driver's airbag was made standard on all variants, a first for an Australian car, even though the Holden VR Commodore was the first to feature it as an option. From the outside, the reinforced body gave added rollover strength and front collision protection. An original innovation introduced in the EF range was the "Smart Bar". A bullbar developed to work seamlessly with the vehicle's airbag system. The EF was codenamed EA77.

The 4.0 L inline six-cylinder engine was upgraded to aid refinement and increase power to 157 kilowatts (211 hp) this included the removal of the distributor as it was replaced with a coil-pack ignition system which was a first for the Falcon. Also the intake manifold was changed to include a dual length system which involved intake runners of two different lengths and a valve to switch between the two. Changes were also made to the suspension with the aim of providing a more supple ride, but drew criticism for producing nervous handling and an unsettling feeling of roll oversteer (a problem not corrected until the EL facelift).

A passenger airbag was offered as an option in the Series II facelift of October 1995. The unique design allowed it to protect the not only the front passenger, but the centre passenger as well (only the entry-level GLi was offered with the optional bench seat). The Fairmont Ghia was the only trim level to receive dual airbags as standard, which also benefited from the XR6 engine, leather upholstery, extensive use of chrome and lowered suspension. With the use of neoprene rubber insulation, road and wind noise was cut off from within the cabin, contributing to vehicle refinement. Ford also dropped the XR6 station wagon from the lineup in the Series II.

The EF Series also saw the first use of polycarbonate headlight lenses instead of glass, saving weight and gaining shatter resistance.

=== EL ===
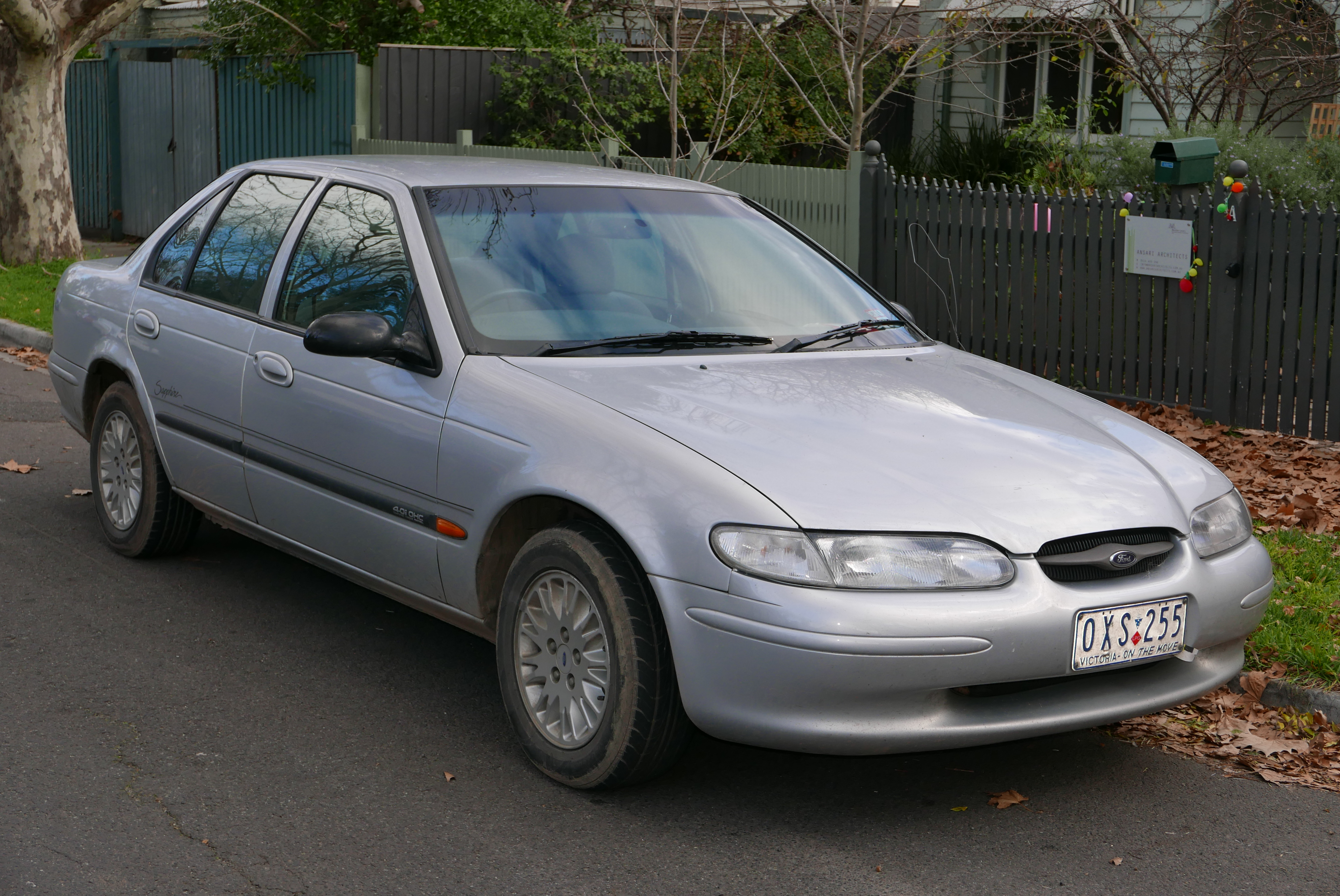
EL Falcon GLi Sapphire sedan

The final E-series model, the EL Falcon, was released in October 1996, and was merely a facelift of the EF intended to keep sales strong until the sixth generation AU Falcon was launched. The most obvious change visually, was the return of the grille on the GLi and Futura spec levels. The new oval grille tied in with Ford's global lineup of the time. Cosmetic updates extended further with the bonnet, front bumper and headlamps also receiving a revised design. New grilles were now prominent on the luxury variants (Fairmont and Fairmont Ghia), and the quad-headlamps of the XR sport models gained minor changes. New wheel trims were featured on all trim levels, and station wagon variants gained white tinted indicator lenses, replacing the amber tint which had been common since the introduction of the EA.

With the EL there was a revision again with the engine this time the distributor was refitted and the coil-pack ignition removed, though power remained the same 157 kilowatts (211 hp) at 4900 rpm / 357 newton-metres (263 lb⋅ft) at 3000 rpm. The final drive ratio went down from 3.23:1 to 3.08:1 allowing for 1700rpm being achieved at 100 km/h in 4th gear.

To address handling concerns with the EF, improvements were made to the rear suspension and steering which would largely be attributed to Ford Australia's association with Tickford Vehicle Engineering. Speed-sensitive power steering on the Fairmont Ghia made parking more straightforward, without compromising high speed steering. With the exception of the GLi, the entire range was fitted with standard Bosch 5.3 ABS brakes and an advanced window film known as "Smart Tint" that gave equivalent protection levels of SPF15 sunscreen.

Interior upgrades ranged from reshaped seats and headrests, to new colour schemes, and switches. Station wagons could now be ordered with third-row accommodation and an electric network for mobile phone usage.

== Sixth generation (1998–2010) ==
=== AU ===
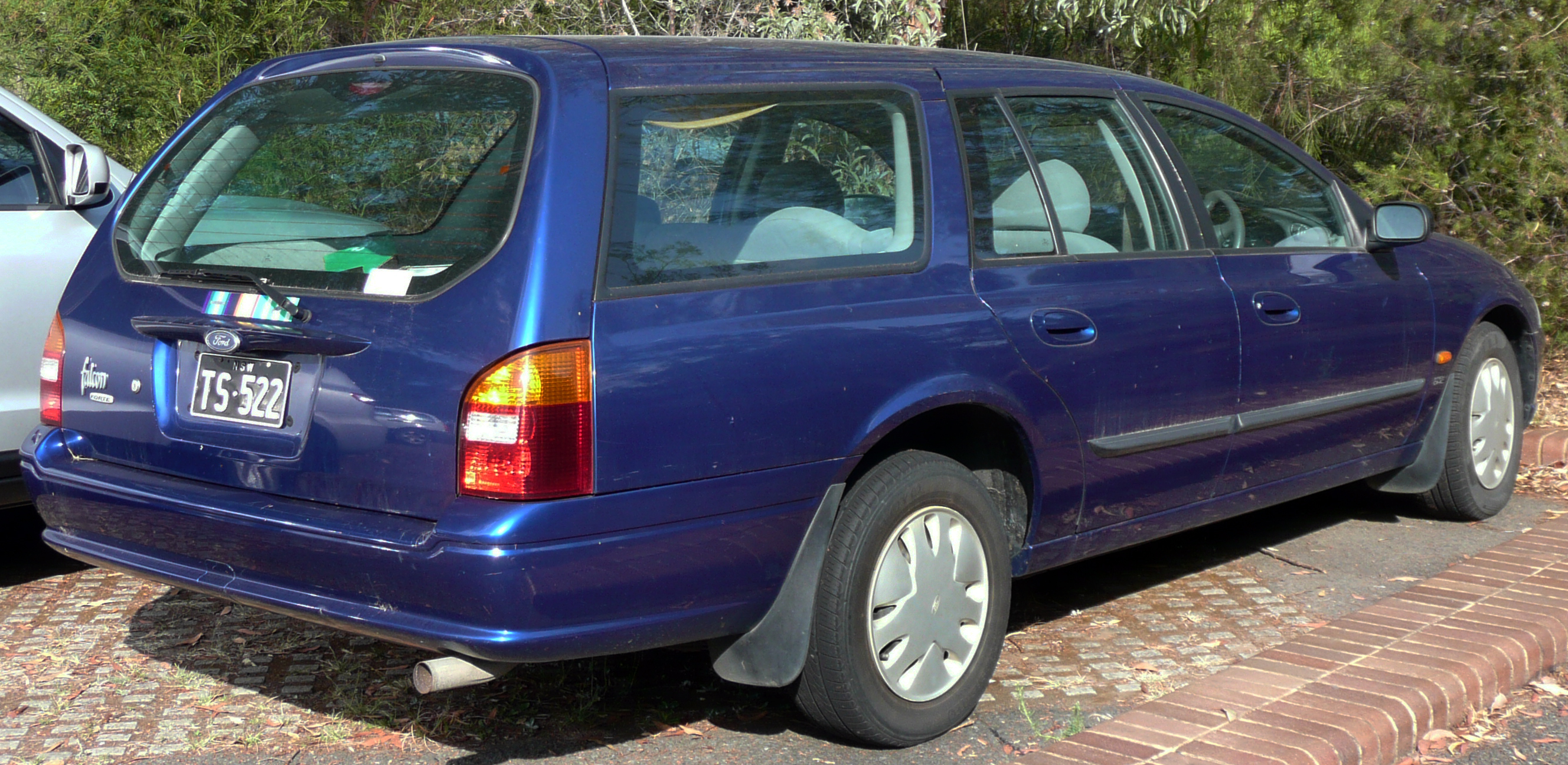
Falcon Forté station wagon (AU)

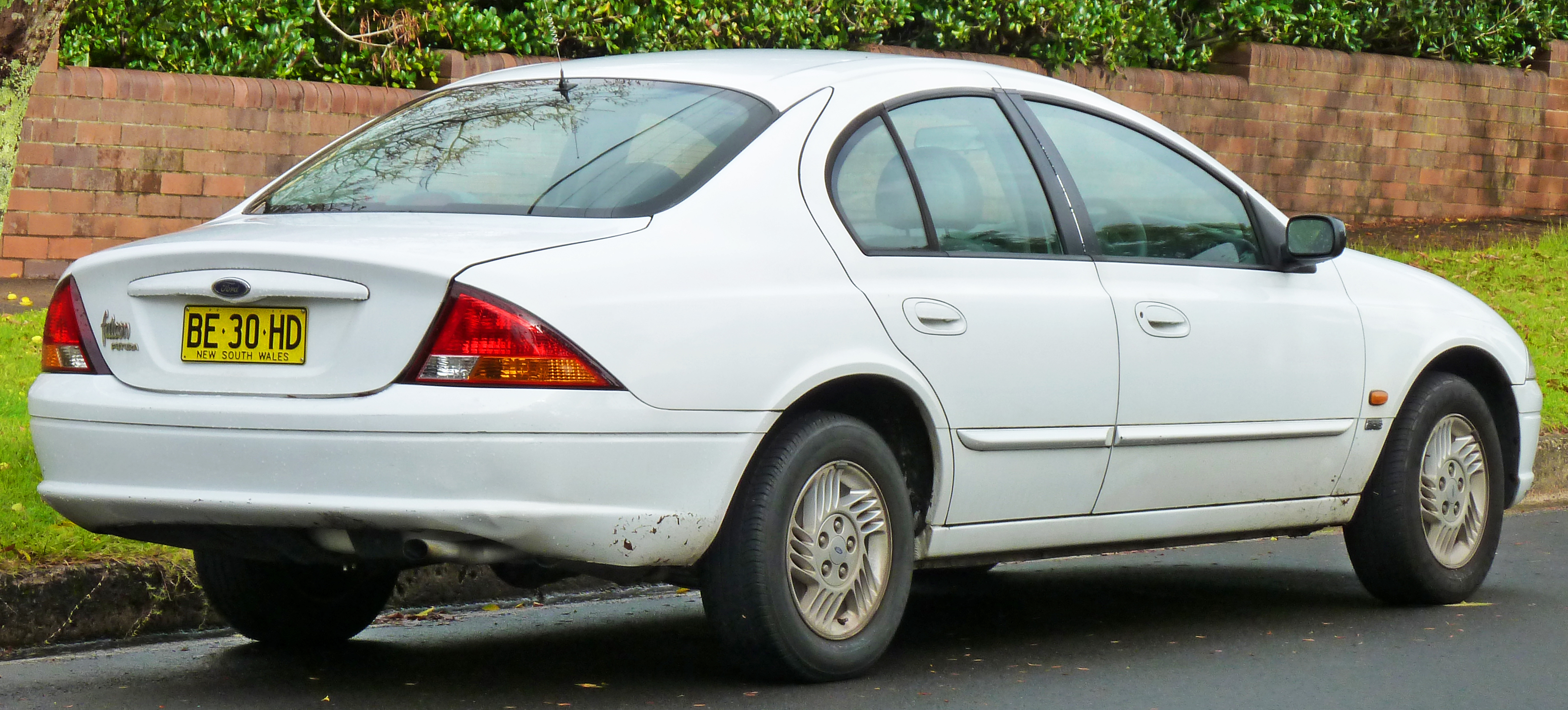
Falcon Futura sedan (AU)

The new-generation AU Falcon was released in 1998 with its range comprising the following models: Forté (previously GLi), S, Futura, Fairmont, Fairmont Ghia, XR6, XR6 VCT and XR8. External model differentiation was achieved via the use of different grilles and bonnets (low bonnet and vertical "waterfall" grille on Forté, horizontal single bar on Futura, integrated quad-lamp bumper bar and grille on the XR sports range; high bonnet and large grille on Fairmont range) and more basic fittings such as different alloy wheel designs, rear light clusters (clear turn signals on Fairmont), body colour-coordination and chrome fittings.

Initially, the company considered a revamped 5th-generation Falcon and even studied the possibility of fully imported replacements such as the American front-wheel-drive Ford Taurus or rear-wheel-drive Ford Crown Victoria, the European rear-wheel-drive Scorpio and, reportedly, even the Japanese rear-wheel drive Mazda 929 (then part of the Ford conglomerate).

Developed under the code name "EA169", the AU series adopted Ford's New Edge worldwide styling, which was meant to differentiate it from the "conformist" styling prevalent in the 1990s. The gamble, which had worked with the Ford Focus, did not particularly endear the AU Falcon to its buyers.

Ford attempted to address the AUs issues with its Series II (April 2000) and Series III (November 2001) updates, which brought styling and interior improvements such as a raised bonnet across the non-XR range (from the Fairmont range), scrapping of the unpopular "waterfall" grille on the base model Forté, revised bigger profile bumper bars, bigger wheels and improved interior trims.

In addition, this series also received mechanical and structural improvements including an upgraded braking system, a laminated firewall engineered to reduce NVH, and incremental power upgrades for the V8 engine. Nevertheless, despite these improvements and ownership incentives (such as free air conditioning and automatic transmission on the biggest volume-seller Forté, plus complimentary scheduled servicing for three years or 60,000 km across the range), Falcon's sales never recovered to meet expectations, being outsold by its chief rival, the Holden VT and its successor, the VX Commodores.

This Falcon's Australian-production firsts included the 6-cylinder's Variable Cam Timing (VCT) and automatic transmissions on the high-performance T-series with an adaptive mode that included steering wheel gear shift buttons.

=== BA ===
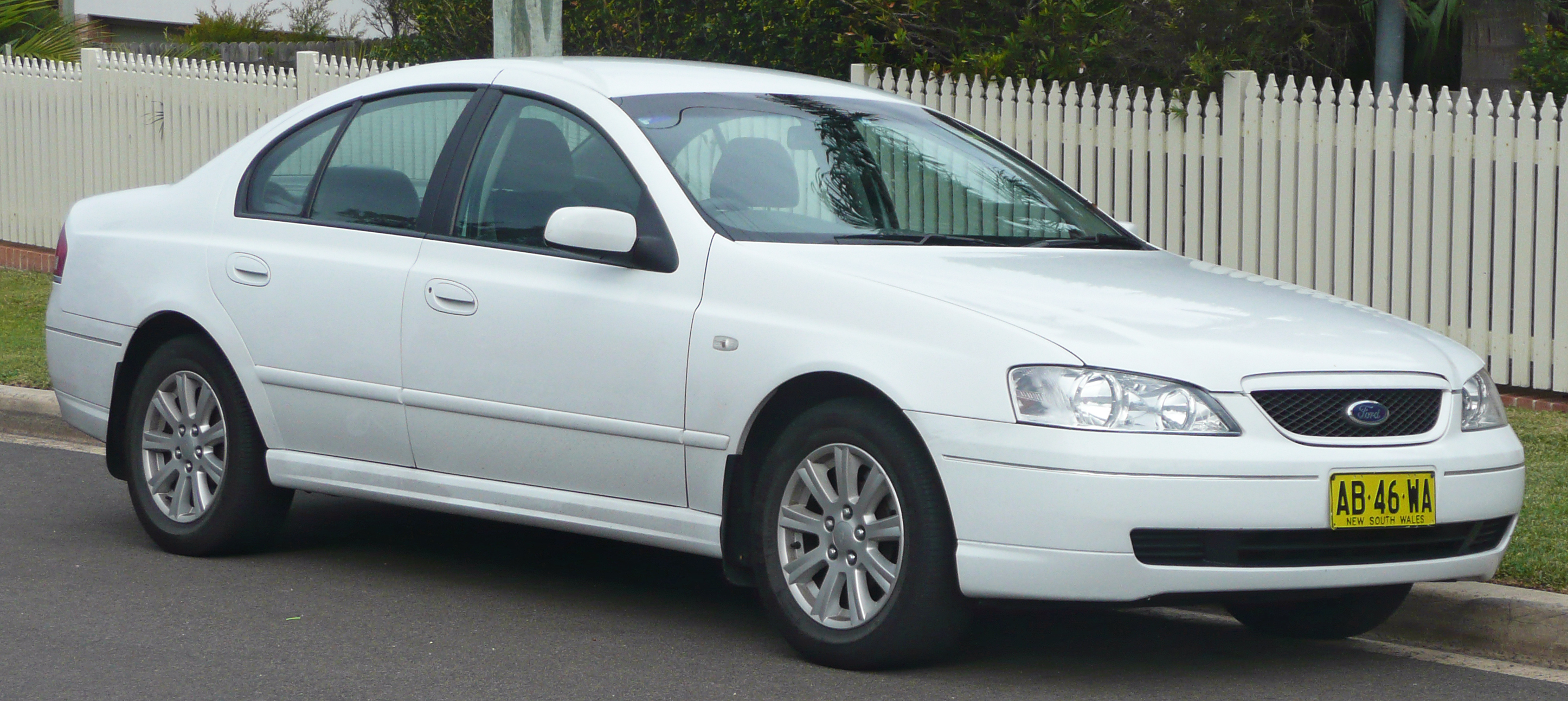
Falcon Futura sedan (BA II)

Officially debuting in September 2002, the BA Falcon was a major update of the AU, with Ford designers and engineers almost wiping the board clean, and in the process spending just over AU$500 million, a figure much larger than previously anticipated. The BA Falcon won the prestigious Wheels Car of the Year Award (COTY) in 2002. Its range comprised the following models: XT (formerly Forté), Futura, Fairmont, Fairmont Ghia, XR6 and XR8. Major elements of the overhaul included the development of a more effective Control-Blade independent rear suspension, a significant revamp of the car's inline 6-cylinder engine as well as two new V8 engines and, to top it all off, new transmissions. Design wise, the BA received a completely new look, with designers giving both the front and rear quarters of the car substantial work, giving it a less aggressive look for the Australian market. A lot of effort went into improving the craftsmanship and fit and finish of both the exterior and interior. On the outside the windscreen washer nozzles were moved off the hood onto the cowl panel. The headlamps were made subflush to the hood and overall most interfaces were improved. The BA also introduced a thoroughly remodelled interior, whereby the 'oval shaped' instrument cluster was replaced with a more conservatively styled cluster. It featured a large LCD screen, situated in a "satin finished" centre console (Called the "Interior Command Centre" or ICC in short). On the interior the design team spent many hours improving the feel of the contact points as well as improving fit and finish and craftsmanship. Within a year of its release, Falcon sales had increased substantially and, for a time, eclipsed Holden Commodore sales.

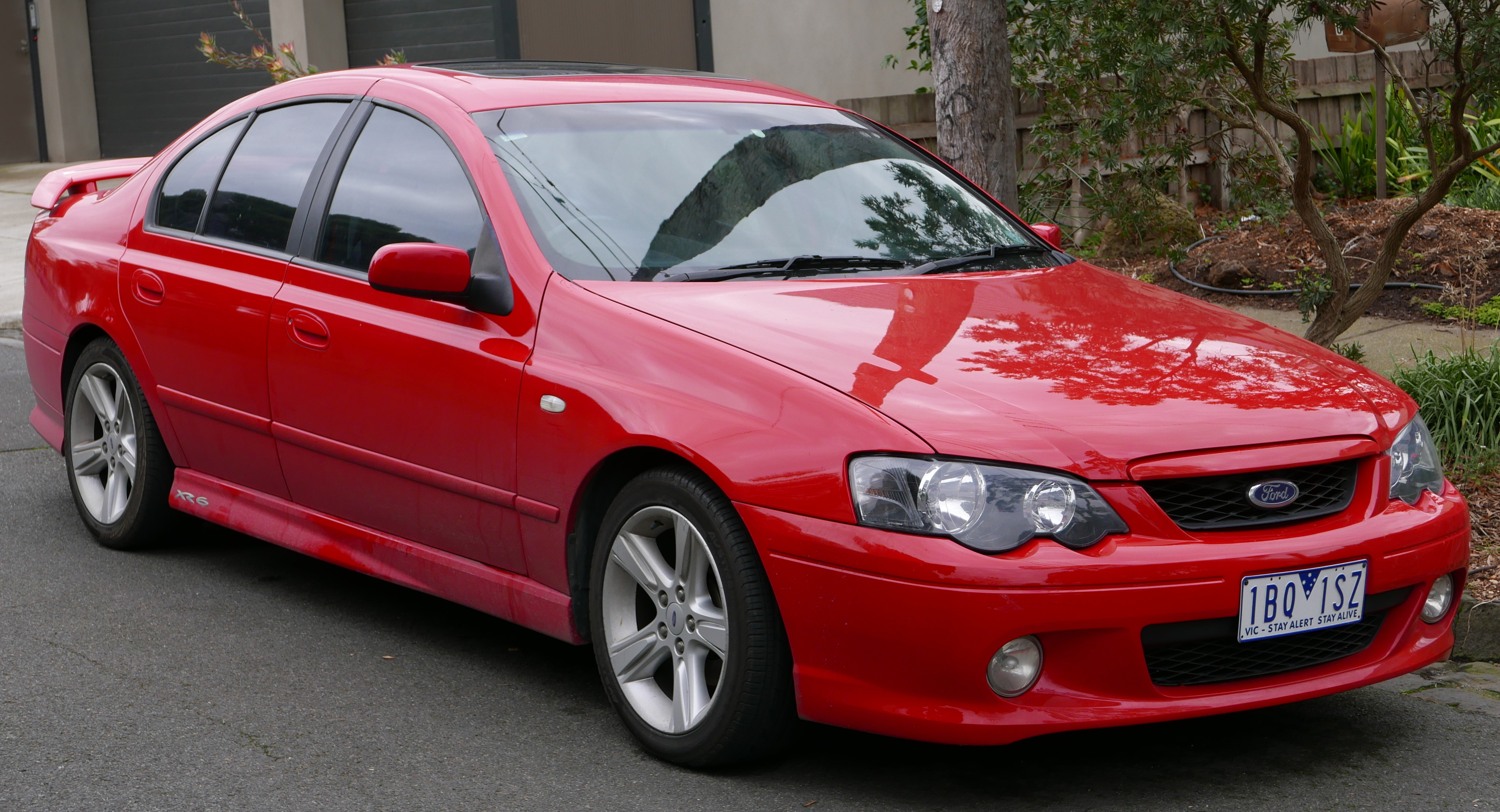
Falcon XR6 (BA II)

Ford introduced their new Barra straight-six 4.0 litre DOHC VCT engines into the lineup, which included a turbocharged (240 kilowatts (320 hp)/450 newton-metres (330 lb⋅ft)) version and base line (182 kilowatts (244 hp)) naturally aspirated version. The BA also featured a new North American designed 5.4 L 4V Boss and Barra 3V V8 engines. The Barra 220 (220 kilowatts (300 hp)/472 newton-metres (348 lb⋅ft)) Boss 260 (260 kilowatts (350 hp)/500 newton-metres (370 lb⋅ft)) and Boss 290 (290 kilowatts (390 hp)/520 newton-metres (380 lb⋅ft)) engines were smoother, quieter and more fuel efficient than the Ford Windsor engine used in the AU. In October 2004, Ford released the Mark II update of the BA. Amongst the changes was a six-speed manual transmission, four new exterior colours, and revised wheels trims.

In 2004 Ford introduced the Territory crossover SUV which was based upon the BA's engine, floorpan and IRS. This was introduced in response to the long term decline in large sedan sales in Australia, since this sector's share of the total market has been steadily shrinking for a decade.

=== BF ===
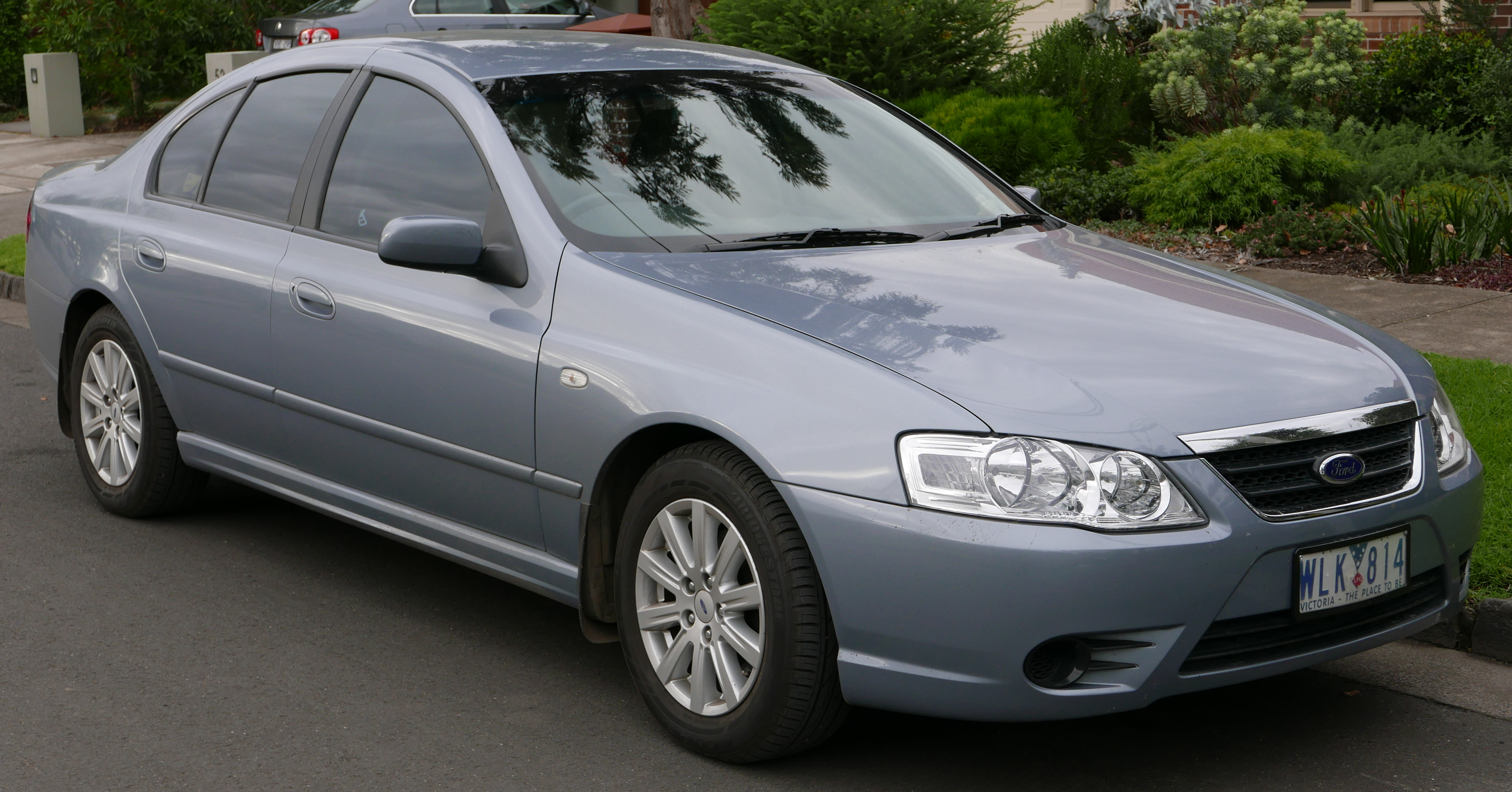
Fairmont sedan (BF II)

Visually similar to its forerunner, the BF update from October 2005 was developed with an emphasis geared more towards powertrain enhancements, rather than design. The BF Falcon received various mechanical upgrades, including minimal engine modifications primarily within the VCT system aiming at individualising the cam operation/timing, and improvements towards noise, vibration, and harshness. The naturally aspirated six-cylinder engine gained an increase in power to 190 kilowatts (250 hp) also contributed due to use of 5–30 recommended oil weight for engine hence bringing improvements in fuel economy and compliance with Euro III emission standards. The turbocharged version of same engine also received further gains in output, with peak power rising to 245 kilowatts (329 hp) and 480 N⋅m (350 lb⋅ft) of torque. Ford, with the BF, also introduced the six-speed ZF 6HP26 automatic transmission and electronic stability control, both of which were made available on selected trim levels.

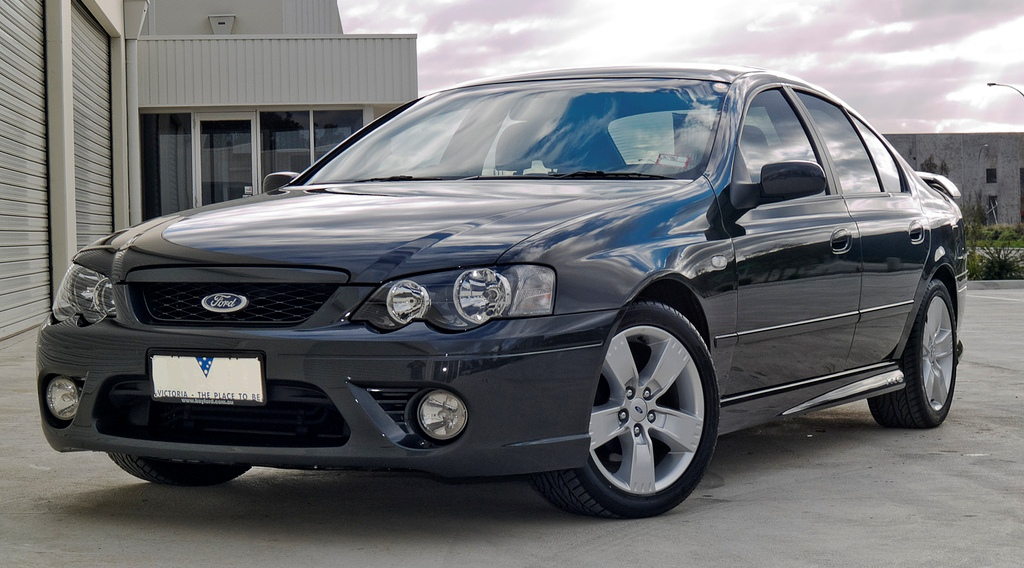
Falcon XR6 (BF II)

Ford updated its Falcon lineup with the Series II update in October 2006. The BF II turbo models had an engine upgrade and came with the same engine as the FPV Typhoon internally, with the only difference being boost pressure, with the XR6 Turbo running 6 PSI boost pressure (FPV, 9PSI). Select trim levels in the BF II range (XT, Futura and Fairmont) saw a modified front-end, which featured more of a sporting image and was more aerodynamic. The entry-level XT could now be specified with the six-speed automatic, with four-speed-automatic continued as the standard transmission. Fuel efficiency figures also improved, with figures of 10.7 L/100 km (22 mpg_{‑US}; 26 mpg_{‑imp}) for the base XT and 10.2 L/100 km (23 mpg_{‑US}; 28 mpg_{‑imp}) for variants fitted with the ZF six-speed automatic.

Following the release of the FG Falcon model in 2008, which lacked a wagon variant, the BF was revised and re-released in Mark III guise, but only in wagon form, and only the base model XT was available.

The Mark III update included Dynamic Stability Control (available on petrol powered models only), a flip key from the FG series Falcon, Satin Alloy Accents on the front grille surround.

At the end of 2010 the Falcon wagon was permanently discontinued. In its place, Ford offered the smaller and fully imported Ford Mondeo wagon and the Australian-made Territory SUV.

The last petrol-engined BF was built on 30 June, while LPG E-Gas models continued until September 2010.

== Seventh generation (2008–2016) ==
=== FG ===
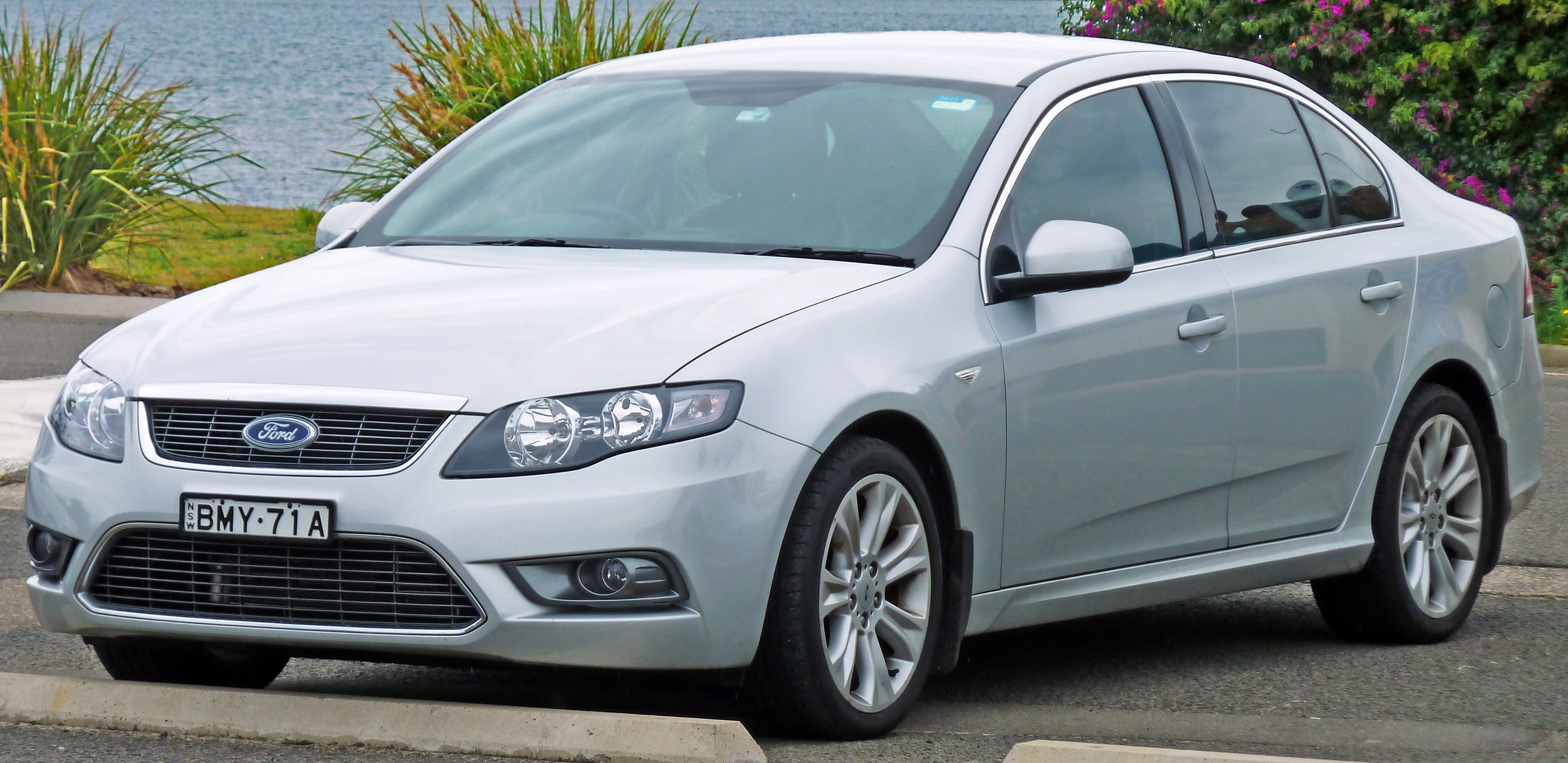
Falcon G6 (FG)

The seventh generation Falcon, known as the "FG", (and initially known as project Orion) was announced at a press event on 17 February 2008. The FG moniker references the now discontinued Fairmont Ghia (with the Futura model also discontinued), consistent with a more streamlined range consisting of: Falcon XT, XR6 and XR8 and the G-series models Falcon G6 and G6E, replacing the base Fairmont and the top-of-the-range Fairmont Ghia (the latter's V8 variant now replaced by the G6E Turbo).

The inline six-cylinder engine received a power upgrade of 5 kilowatts (6.7 hp) and 8 newton-metres (5.9 lb⋅ft) to 195 kilowatts (261 hp) at 6000 rpm/391 newton-metres (288 lb⋅ft) at 3250 rpm. The turbocharged engine used in the XR6 Turbo and G6E Turbo models produces (270 kilowatts (360 hp) and 533 newton-metres (393 lb⋅ft)). The power output of is similar to previous FPV turbos, but it is a substantially modified design: the new induction system which includes a bigger and more efficient intercooler, higher compression ratio, extra boost and strengthened internals are the key changes. The XT, G6 and G6E also have an E-Gas (LPG) option. The engine continues to use a similar VCT system as its BA/BF predecessors. Fuel consumption has been improved over the outgoing model. The XR6 Turbo received Motor magazine's Bang for your Buck 2008 award.

The FG adds a "Virtual-Pivot" system to the front suspension designed to improve levels of steering, handling and turn-in; and complements Ford's Control-Blade IRS system first introduced on the BA Falcon in 2002.

In an unprecedented move, at the 2008 introduction of the FG Falcon, the XR8 was the only V8 model available. The unique 5.4 litre V8 (initially launched in 2003) produced 290 kilowatts (390 hp)/520 newton-metres (380 lb⋅ft). In June 2010, new emissions regulations introduced meant that the iconic V8 engine had to be discontinued. Ford phased this out quietly; motoring magazines did not even report on it. However, at the time the V8 was phased out, Ford's performance subsidiary, FPV, introduced a Ford America sourced V8, the 5.0 L Coyote (as used in the Mustang). Prodrive specifically developed the engine in Australia to FPV's own standards (read below). A new FPV model, the GS, was released to "plug the hole" between the XR6 Turbo and the higher level (and price) FPV V8 models when the XR8 was phased out. The GS is an entry point to FPV, taking many of the sales that would have been destined for the former Ford XR8.

The 5.0 L 'modular V8' engine is currently the Ford Performance Vehicles' V8 engine, released in June 2010. Initially two versions were released, one rated at 315 kilowatts (422 hp) and 545 newton-metres (402 lb⋅ft) of torque and the other at 335 kilowatts (449 hp) and 570 newton-metres (420 lb⋅ft) of torque. Both engines carry the 'Boss' moniker, with the 315 kW version dubbed the "Boss 315", and the more powerful version dubbed the "Boss 335".

In 2010, Ford Australia celebrated 50 years of continuous Falcon production, from 1960 to date. A special XR50 model was released to commemorate the occasion. The commemorative model marked the start of the FG update.

The first update to the FG model was released in the second half of 2010. The Mk2 update adds several interior and exterior elements as standard to all vehicles. iPod Integration and Bluetooth are now standard across the range and all models except the XT receive an 8 in colour touch screen. The popular ZF six-speed 6HP26 and 6HP21 (Ecoboost) automatic has also been made standard across the range, spelling the end of the successful four- and five-speed automatics. Other changes included an all new front bumper design, alternative wheel rim design, new floor mats and side step designs. All models receive curtain airbags.

The Mk2 also received numerous updates including a new revised A/C HVAC system, six airbags standard across the range to enhance safety and improved sound deadening to all models to give a more refined, quiet ride.

It was announced in mid-2009 that Ford would start production of a direct-injection, turbocharged four-cylinder "EcoBoost" version of the Falcon. The first ever four cylinder Falcon was released for sale in April 2012, and was fitted with the 2.0 GTDI version of the EcoBoost engine.

A new liquid-injection LPG engine (EcoLPi) was introduced in second half of 2011. It provides superior performance and fuel economy compared to the previous E-gas LPG engine.

The FG Falcon was the first Australian manufactured car to achieve five stars in the independent ANCAP crash safety testing. It achieved a score of 34.6 out of 37. But unlike the FG Mk1, every Mk2 gets the five-star ANCAP safety rating as all cars now get six airbags as standard.

This series marked the end of all Ford Performance Vehicles, after the launch of the FPV GT-F 351 sedans (of which 500 are reserved for Australia and 50 for New Zealand) and Pursuit Ute (total of 120), in June 2014.

=== FG X ===
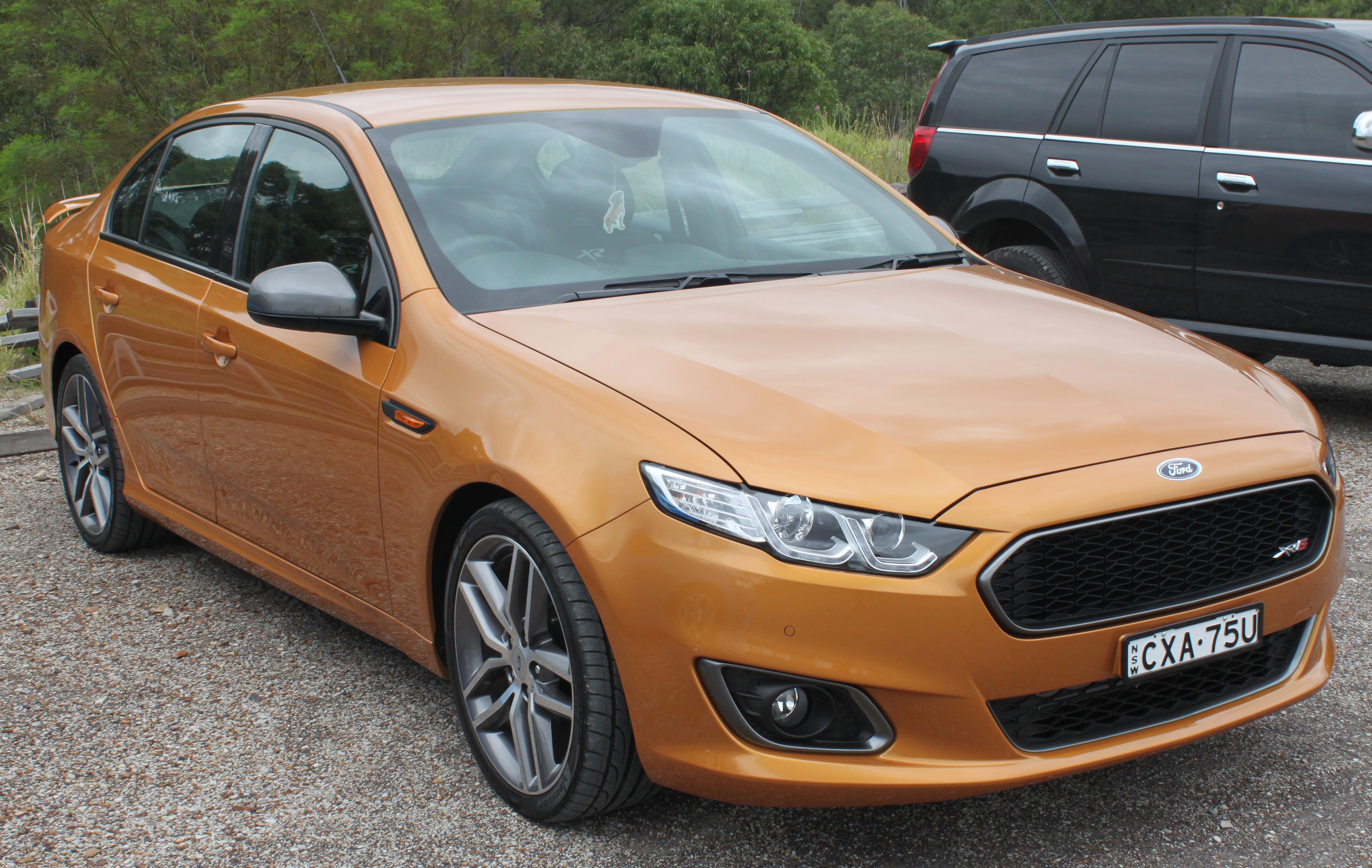
FG X Falcon XR6 Turbo

The FG X series, codenamed 201X, was the last ever production run of Falcon, with production ending on the 7th of October 2016.

In July 2014, Ford Australia released official photographs of Falcon's last iteration in XR guise, labelling the reintroduced XR8 as the "best Falcon ever".

Externally, this Falcon's redesigned front end adopts Ford's Kinetic 2.0 styling theme featuring the trapezoidal grille which debuted on the Ford Evos concept. The re-introduction of the iconic XR8 model stems from the closure of Ford Performance Vehicles's operations, hence the reason why this model features the bulk of the FPV GT driveline, including the local supercharged "Miami" variant of the Coyote V8.

In August 2014, Ford Australia revealed that this last series would be known as the "FG X", following significant feedback from key enthusiasts. The new series code, like the preceding G6 trim level, pays homage to the Fairmont and Ghia nameplates of past generations whereas the X alludes to Falcon's most popular series, from the XR to XF.

== Falcon utility ==
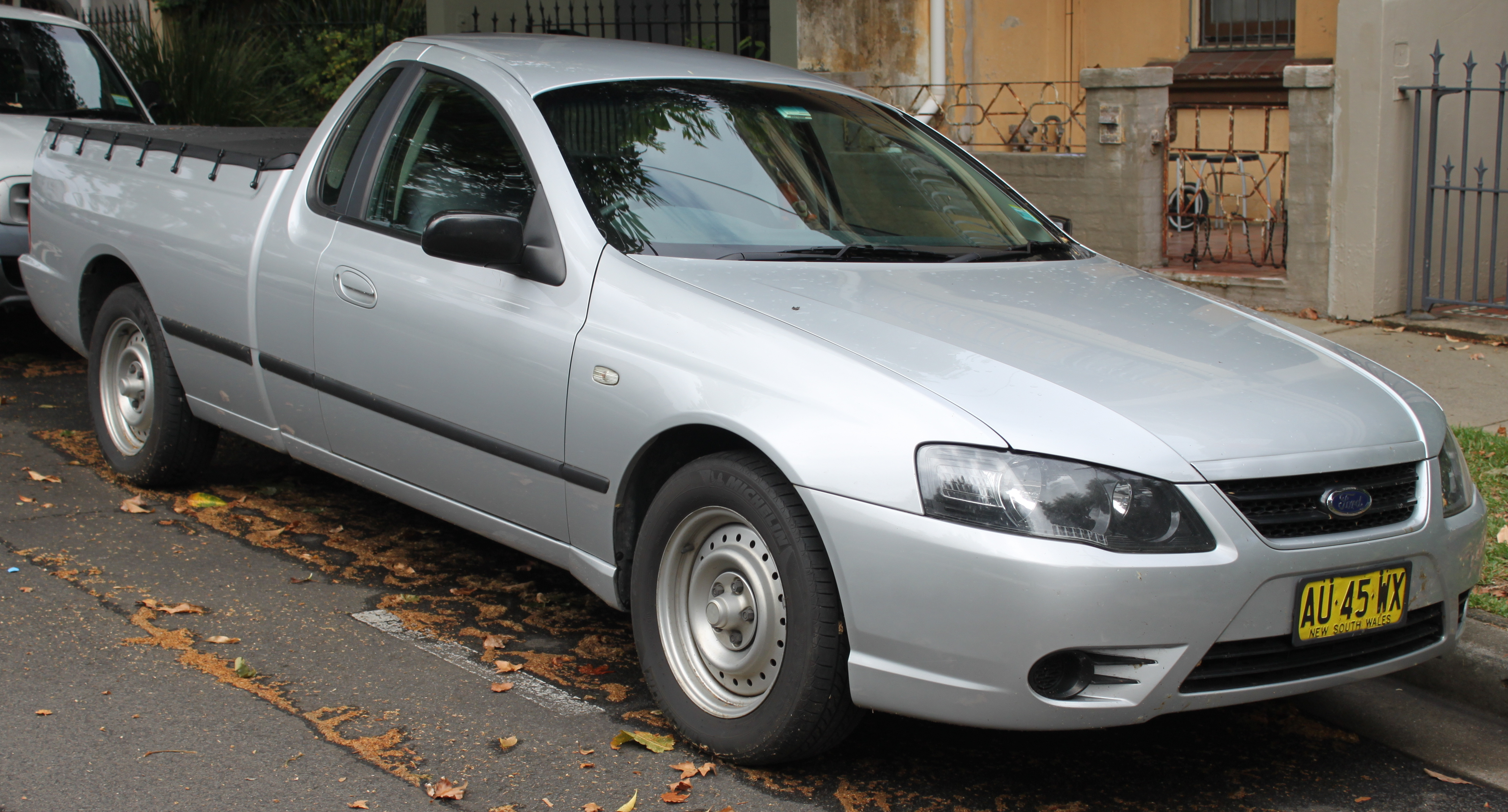
BF II Falcon XL utility

The Australian affection for the ute (short for "utility") allowed the Falcon to serve as the base model for their line of utes and panel vans, starting in 1961 and gaining rapid recognition by (usually younger) enthusiasts by the mid-1960s. As the base sedan and station wagon models of the Falcon further evolved, so too did the ute and panel van models, although usually up to a year or so after initial release into the market. The only exception was the XF series, which lasted through the initial EA26 era. While EA26 ute prototypes were actually built, the XF shell continued through to the 1998 release of the AU model, in 1996 gaining the nose treatment of the then current EF series Falcon, with a combination of XF and E-Series Interiors. Low Series XH utes did not have airbags, for example.

The Falcon Ute award-winning modified vehicle (2004-2010) project led by TJ Andrews Funeral Directors, Simon Orton from Leslie Consulting, Tod Lawler, and Ford Australia engineer Graeme Sheahan, created an opportunity to manufacture a world-class hearse (Allonge) for the funeral industry.

The Falcon utility ended production on 29 July 2016, with 467,690 utilities produced between 1961 and 2016.

== Exports ==
Australian Falcon exports were traditionally confined to right-hand-drive countries in the Asia-Pacific region, such as New Zealand (where Ford New Zealand sometimes devised local trim variations, such as the XR Falcon 600 and the XA Luxury V8), and Pacific Island nations like Papua New Guinea and Fiji. New Zealand assembly of the Falcon began at Seaview with the XR in 1966 and XA assembly was moved to the new plant in Wiri in 1973. The cars generally followed Australian specifications but the model line was limited and factory options were little more than automatic transmission, though the 1979 XD Fairmont Ghia 302 V8 was the first locally assembled car to offer air conditioning as a build option (NZ$1,050). New Zealand assembly ceased in the early 1990s, after which all Falcons sold locally were fully imported from Australia.

The only significant export market for the Falcon outside of Oceania was South Africa, where the EL was released in 1996, including the GLi, Futura, Fairmont and XR6 in its line-up. This was succeeded by the AU, but was dropped in the early 2000s. (In the early 1970s, the Falcon XY had been assembled in South Africa as the Fairmont, before being fully imported.) Some limousines and hearses (inc. LPG-only powered Utes) were exported to the UK by Coleman Milne, who used to convert European-made Granadas and Scorpios for the same purpose. Earlier, some XA and XB Fairmonts were shipped to the UK as was the contemporary LTD which was modified with Ford Europe tail lights to add the mandatory rear fog lamps and also had to have new screenwash nozzles as the protruding original items did not meet EU safety rules.

Hong Kong also imported a small batch of LPG-powered AU Falcon station wagons for trial as taxis, and although this model initially found favour in luggage capacity with operators when compared to mainstream taxis like the Toyota Comfort, it did not see success there, citing higher operating costs.

Ford had intended on developing the car with left-hand-drive export potential, and received federal and state government grants to assist, but in October 2007, it was announced by Ford Australia president Tom Gorman that the left-hand-drive Falcon project was to be abandoned and the export-incentive grant money would be directed to construction of the Ford Focus small car in Australia. In the end, the Focus project did not proceed as its parent company messed up a lucrative local component sourcing arrangement, so the Asia-Pacific production of that model was instead started at a new plant in Thailand in June 2012. As the FG Falcon utilises much of the previous model's architecture, converting it to left-hand drive would have been a costly and time-consuming process.

Ford Australia at one time considered exporting the FG Falcon to China and the Middle East. Sales to the Middle East of previous models were not feasible, as the market was already served by the Ford Crown Victoria, which was later discontinued.

== Replacements and end of production ==
In 1996, Ford Australia imported the boldly-styled third-generation Taurus as a potential replacement of the venerable, but by then dated, Falcon platform. This Taurus was available only as a sedan and in its highest Ghia specification (with a luxury pack option), despite other variants and a wagon being available in its home US market. It was smaller than the Falcon and was powered by a 3.0 litre V6 engine. Due to poor sales, Taurus imports into Australia ended in 1998, the same year the AU Falcon launched.

In 2009, Ford's European design head Martin Smith suggested that not even the sixth-generation Taurus that was due in 2010 could be a true replacement for the rear-wheel-drive Falcon, despite this time being of similar size.

On 23 May 2013, Ford Australia announced the end of its local manufacturing operations (involving Falcon and Territory models) by October 2016, with the Falcon nameplate destined to retire after 56 years of continuous production in Australia. A high manufacturing cost base (with costs at the Campbellfield plant some four times higher than in Ford's Asian plants and twice as much as in Europe) and unsustainable low sales of its Australian-made products were factors in Ford Motor Company's decision to end its Australian manufacturing activities after 90 years. The announcement put an end to years of speculation concerning the Falcon's future, which included the possibility of the Falcon switching from its current Australia-only architecture to a global large car platform to be built for all world markets as part of the "One Ford" global product development plan implemented in 2006. The options consisted of either a rear-wheel-drive platform (shared with Mustang) or a transverse front-wheel-drive platform (shared with Explorer and Taurus). Ultimately, it was decided by Ford that the Ford Mustang coupé would be the only rear-wheel drive Ford car built for all global markets and that the Falcon nameplate would be retired.

The fourth-generation Mondeo from Europe and the sixth-generation Mustang from North America both indirectly replaced the Falcon. Beginning from 2015, the new model of the right-hand drive Mustang returned to the Australian market after a 13-year absence, as part of Ford's efforts to boost sales of the Mustang brand worldwide and still give Ford Australia a flagship car to replace the Falcon XR and FPV GT V8 range.

== Sales ==
Ford Falcon sales in Australia
| 1980s | Variant | 1980 | 1981 | 1982 | 1983 | 1984 | 1985 | 1986 | 1987 | 1988 | 1989 |
|---|---|---|---|---|---|---|---|---|---|---|---|
| 1980s | | | | 84,184 | 61,549 | 68,313 | 76,818 | | | | |
| 1990s | Variant | 1990 | 1991 | 1992 | 1993 | 1994 | 1995 | 1996 | 1997 | 1998 | 1999 |
| 1990s | Sedan/wagon | 58,967 | 48,430 | 57,832 | 64,941 | 72,924 | 81,366 | 77,835 | 71,850 | 68,758 | 70,084 |
| 1990s | Ute | ? | 3,545 | 3,365 | 4,831 | 6,746 | 6,922 | 8,094 | 7,311 | 6,769 | 10,493 |
| 1990s | Van^{†} | ? | 1,643 | 1,406 | 1,385 | 1,464 | 1,391 | 1,144 | 1,004 | 864 | 383 |
| 2000s | Variant | 2000 | 2001 | 2002 | 2003 | 2004 | 2005 | 2006 | 2007 | 2008 | 2009 |
| 2000s | Sedan/wagon | 60,460 | 53,534 | 54,629 | 73,220 | 65,384 | 53,080 | 42,390 | 33,941 | 31,936 | 31,023 |
| 2000s | Ute | 13,698 | 16,955 | 17,883 | 20,212 | 20,123 | 18,384 | 15,858 | 13,758 | 12,600 | 12,180 |
| 2010s | Variant | 2010 | 2011 | 2012 | 2013 | 2014 | 2015 | 2016 | 2017 | 2018 | 2019 |
| 2010s | Sedan/wagon^{††} | 29,516 | 18,741 | 14,036 | 10,610 | 6,349 | 5,938 | 4,434 | 210 | | |
| 2010s | Ute | 9,099 | 6,814 | 5,733 | 4,679 | 2,785 | 2,654 | 2,170 | 72 | | |

^{†} Falcon van production ended in 1999.
^{††} Falcon station wagon production ended in 2010.

Australian large car sales (1991–2012)
| View source data. | Holden Commodore (sedan and wagon) Ford Falcon (sedan and wagon) Toyota Camry/ Avalon/Aurion (V6) Other Total large car segment |
